= Hagia Sophia, Trabzon =

Mosque in Trabzon, Turkey

Coordinates: 41°00′12″N 39°41′46″E

Hagia Sophia
- Ἁγία Σοφία (Greek); Ayasofya (Turkish)
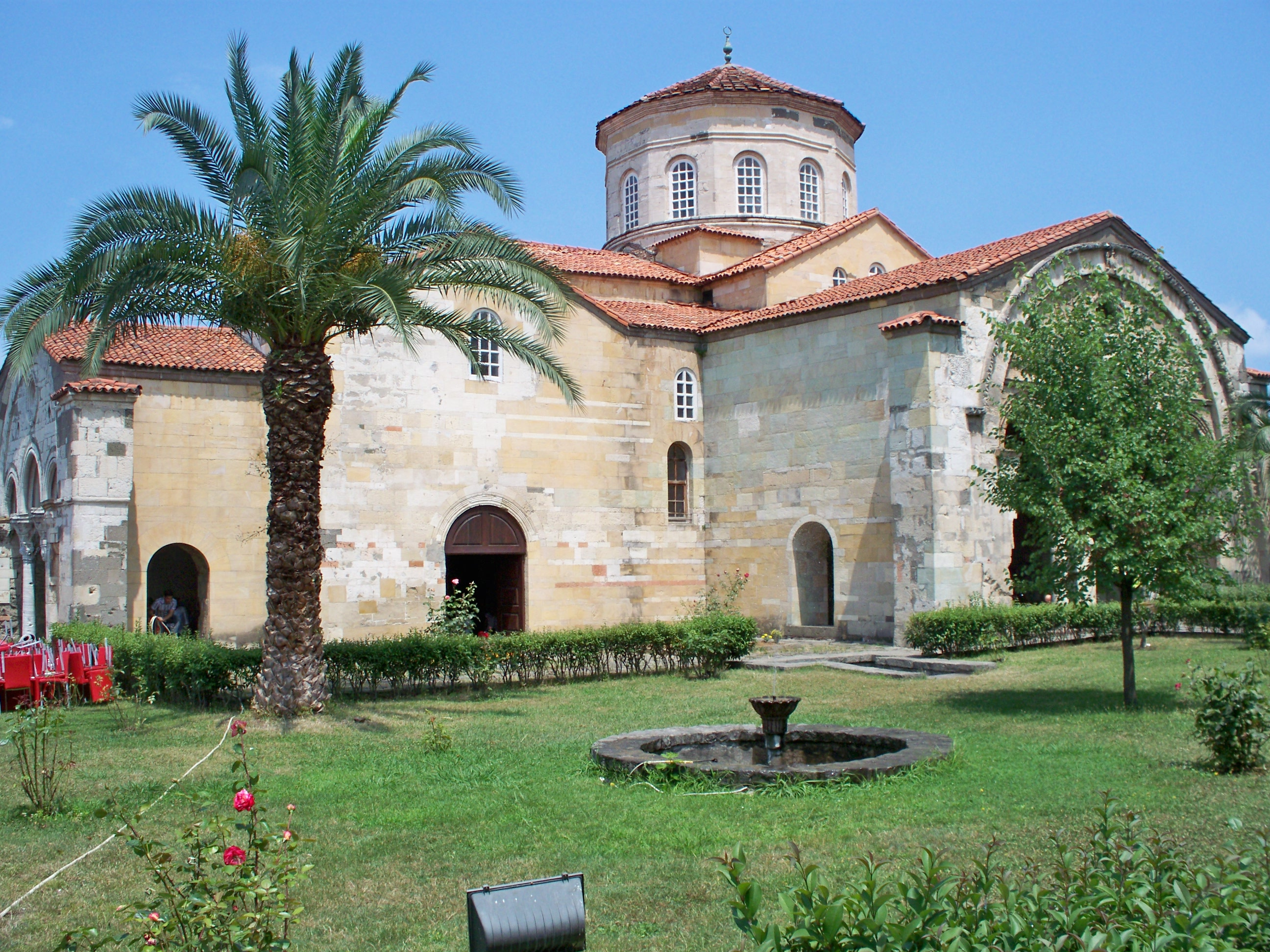
- A view of the Hagia Sophia of Trabzon

Religion
- Affiliation: Islam
- Status: Greek Orthodox church (1238–1461); Mosque (1461–present)

Location
- Location: Fatih, Ortahisar, Trabzon, Turkey
- Interactive map of Hagia Sophia

Architecture
- Groundbreaking: 1238 (as a church)
- Completed: 1263
- Inscriptions: The Holy Wisdom, a reference to the second person of the Trinity, or Jesus Christ
- Materials: Roman brick

Website
- trabzon.gov.tr

Hagia Sophia (Greek: Αγία Σοφία, meaning 'the Holy Wisdom'; Turkish: Ayasofya) is a formerly Greek Orthodox church that was converted into a mosque following the conquest of Trabzon by Mehmed II in 1461. It is located in Trabzon, northeastern Turkey. It was converted into a museum in 1964 and back into a mosque in 2013. The building dates back to the thirteenth century, when Trabzon was the capital of the Empire of Trebizond. It is located near the seashore and two miles west of the medieval town's limits. It is one of a few dozen Byzantine sites extant in the area and has been described as being "one of the finest examples of Byzantine architecture".

== History ==
Hagia Sophia was built in Trebizond during the reign of Manuel I between 1238 and 1263. The oldest graffiti carved in the apses of the church contain the dates 1291 and 1293. After Mehmed II conquered the city in 1461, the church was possibly converted into a mosque and its frescos covered in whitewash. Other scholars suggest it was not converted until 1584, being spared the initial transformation because it stood several kilometers outside the city walls. The adjacent monastery continued to be used by monks as late as 1701, when Tournefort found them still in residence. It is likely that the monks gradually abandoned a building that failed to protect them from harassment and predation, and the Turks assumed its use without needing to expel them.

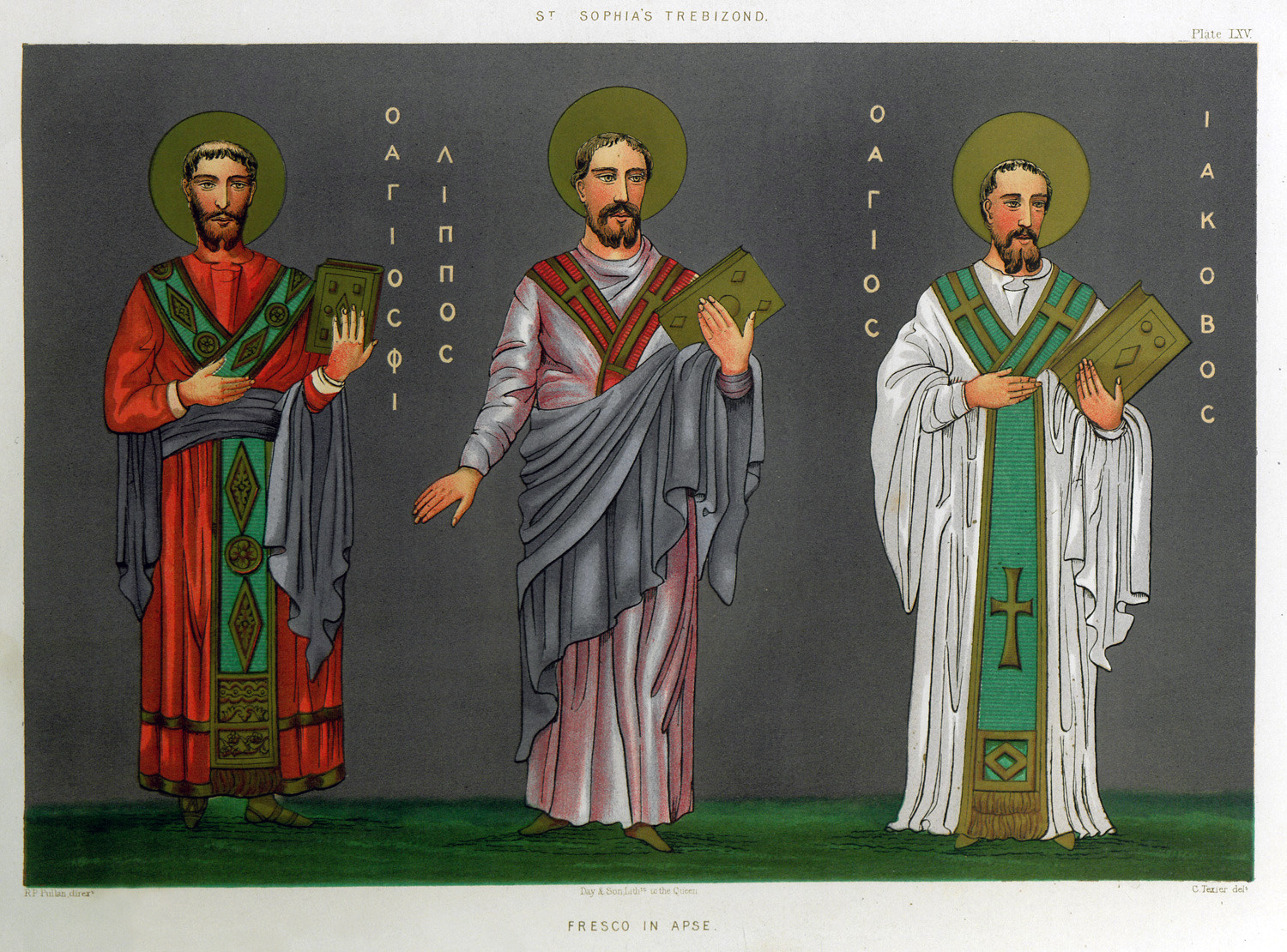
Rendering of a Fresco in the apse of the Hagia Sophia in Trebizond (Trabzon, Turkey), 1864.

According to local tradition, at the turn of the 19th century the site was used as a cholera hospital. During World War I the city was occupied by the Russian military and for the first time the church could be examined by archaeologists, including Fyodor Uspensky, and some preliminary cleaning of the wall paintings began. In the 1940s it was reported to be locked and used as a store, but by the 1950s it was again in use as a mosque. In 1964, when it was turned into a museum. Between 1958 and 1964 the surviving frescoes were uncovered and the church consolidated with the help of experts from the University of Edinburgh and the General Directorate of Foundations; one expert involved in the work estimated no more than one-sixth of the original decorations had survived. All that did survive, however, are thought to be original works done just after its construction, and are considered part of the Byzantine Palaiologan Renaissance.

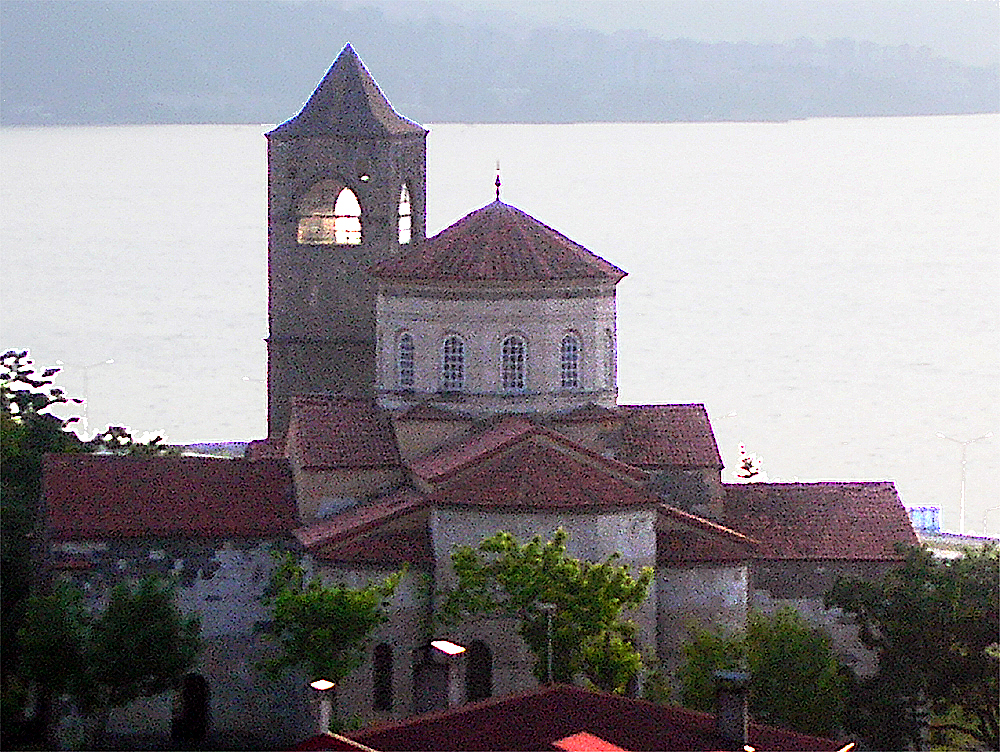
A view of the Hagia Sophia of Trabzon (today a mosque) with its bell tower and the Black Sea coast in the background

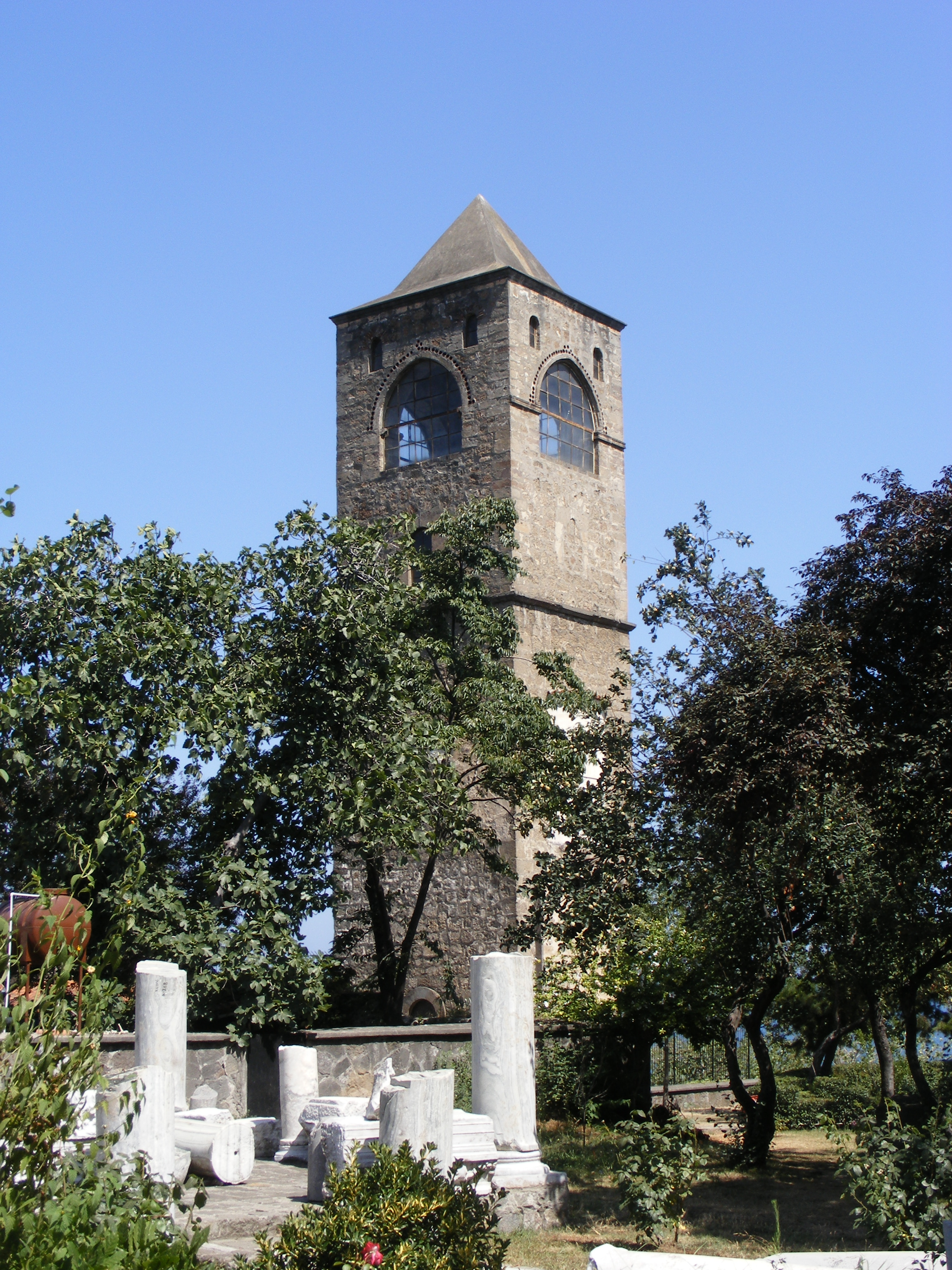
Bell tower

The Hagia Sophia church is an important example of late Byzantine architecture, being characterised by a high central dome and four large column arches supporting the weight of the dome and ceiling. Below the dome is an Opus sectile pavement of multicolored stones. The church was built with a cross-in-square plan, but with an exterior form that takes the shape of a cross thanks to prominent north and south porches. The structure is 22 metres long, 11.6 metres wide and 12.7 metres tall. The late 13th-century frescos, revealed during the University of Edinburgh restoration, illustrate New Testament themes. External stone figurative reliefs and other ornamenting is in keeping with local traditions found in Armenia and Georgia. 24 metres to the west of the church is a tall bell tower, 40 metres high. It was built in 1427 and houses a small chapel on its second floor. The internal walls of the bell tower are covered in frescoes. It was also used as an observatory by local astronomers.

=== Mosque conversion ===
In 2012, the religious authorities (Diyanet) filed a lawsuit against the ministry of culture, claiming the ministry had been 'illegally occupying' the church for some decades. The Diyanet won the case and received the ownership of the building. On 5 July 2013, the former church was partially converted for a while into a mosque according to the local Vakif Direction of Trabzon, which is the owner of the estate. The reconstruction works were started, in which some frescoes were veiled and the floor covered by a carpet. The mufti of the Turkish province Trabzon said that “the works for opening the Hagia Sophia mosque in the city to practice prayers again are going on,” and claimed that “during the prayer the mural paintings will be covered by curtains". The local union of architects from Trabzon filed a lawsuit against the ministry of religious affairs' conversion plan. A local judge ruled the transformation of the former church to be illegal, and ordered it to be maintained as a museum. However, it has remained a mosque. Between 2013 and 2018 the fresco's and opus sectile floor mosaic in the prayer hall were covered by immovable curtains and carpets, while the frescoes in the narthex remained uncovered. During renovation works from 2018 to 2020 the building was closed to visitors. A report drafted by the local union of architects heavily criticized the 2013 mosque conversion, and a court ordered the ministry of religious affairs to fulfill its promise and make the frescoes visible outside prayer time. In 2020 a retractable suspended ceiling was put in place underneath the dome, and a glass floor was placed over the opus sectile mosaic.

== Cultural significance ==
The church figures prominently and has key significance for the lead character's spiritual development in Rose Macaulay's novel The Towers of Trebizond. "It took me some time to make out the Greek inscription, which was about saving me from my sins, and I hesitated to say this prayer, as I really did not want to be saved from my sins, not for the time being, it would make things too difficult and too sad."

== Gallery ==
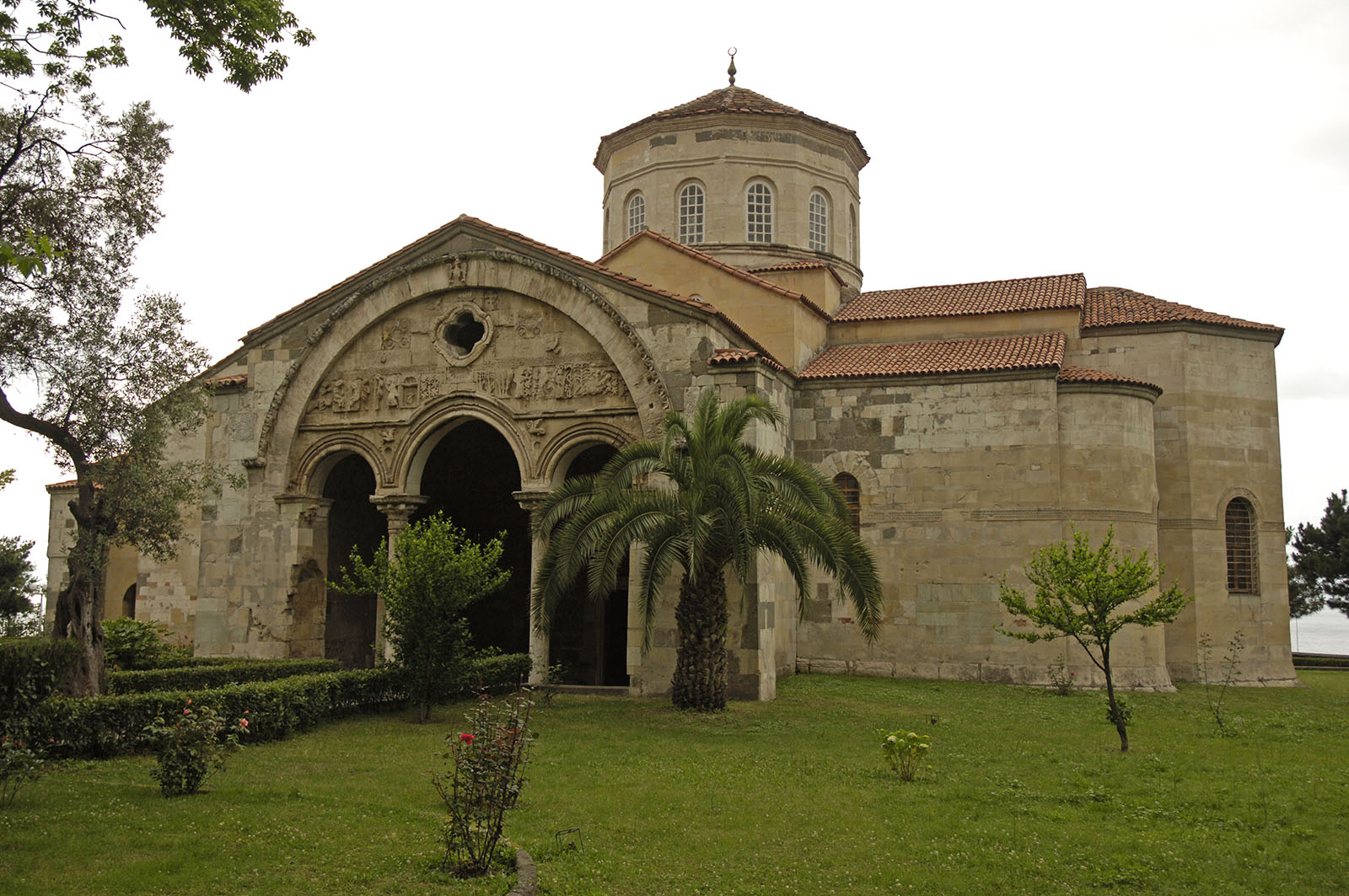
Exterior south side

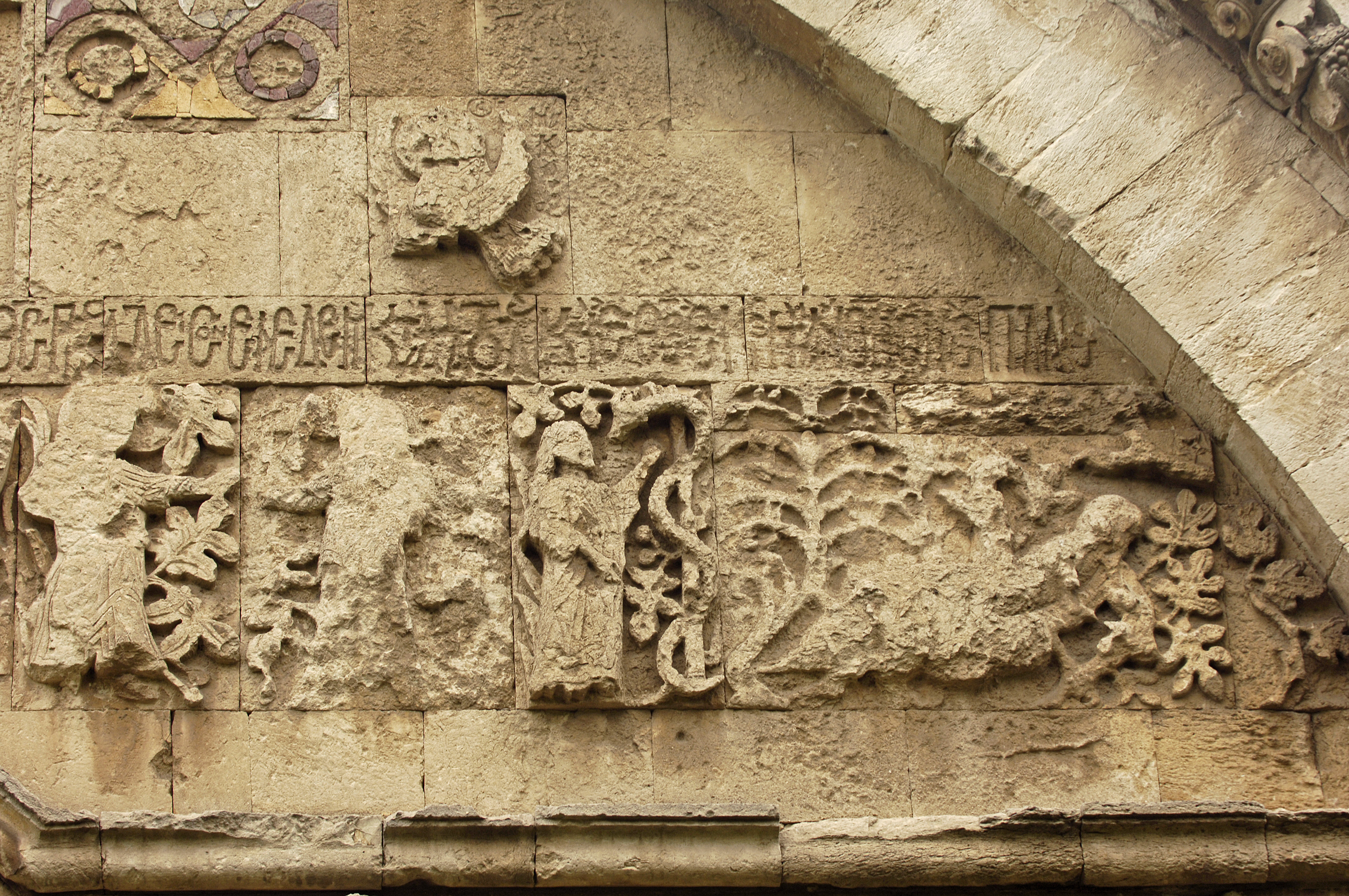
Decoration exterior

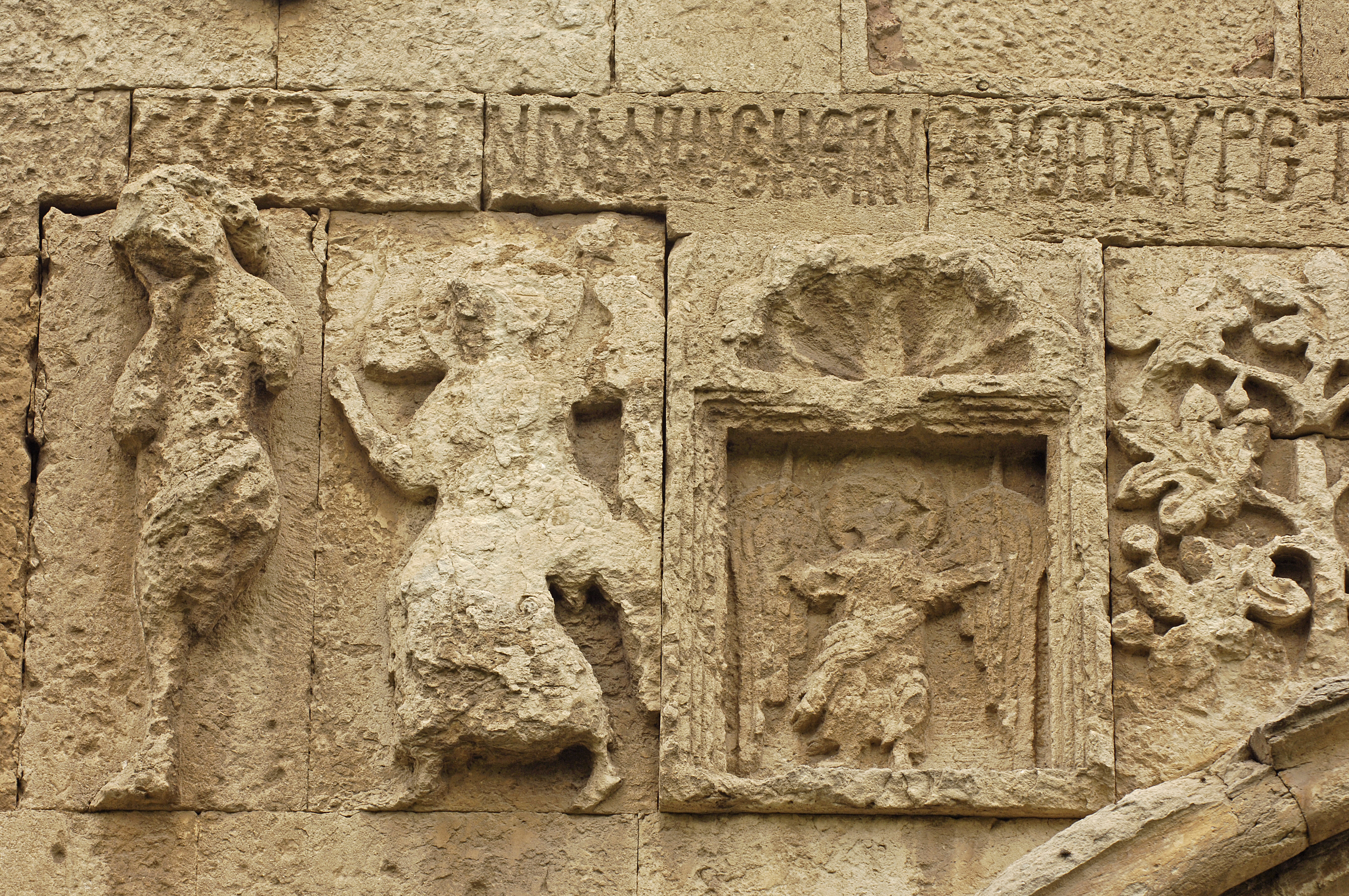
Decoration exterior

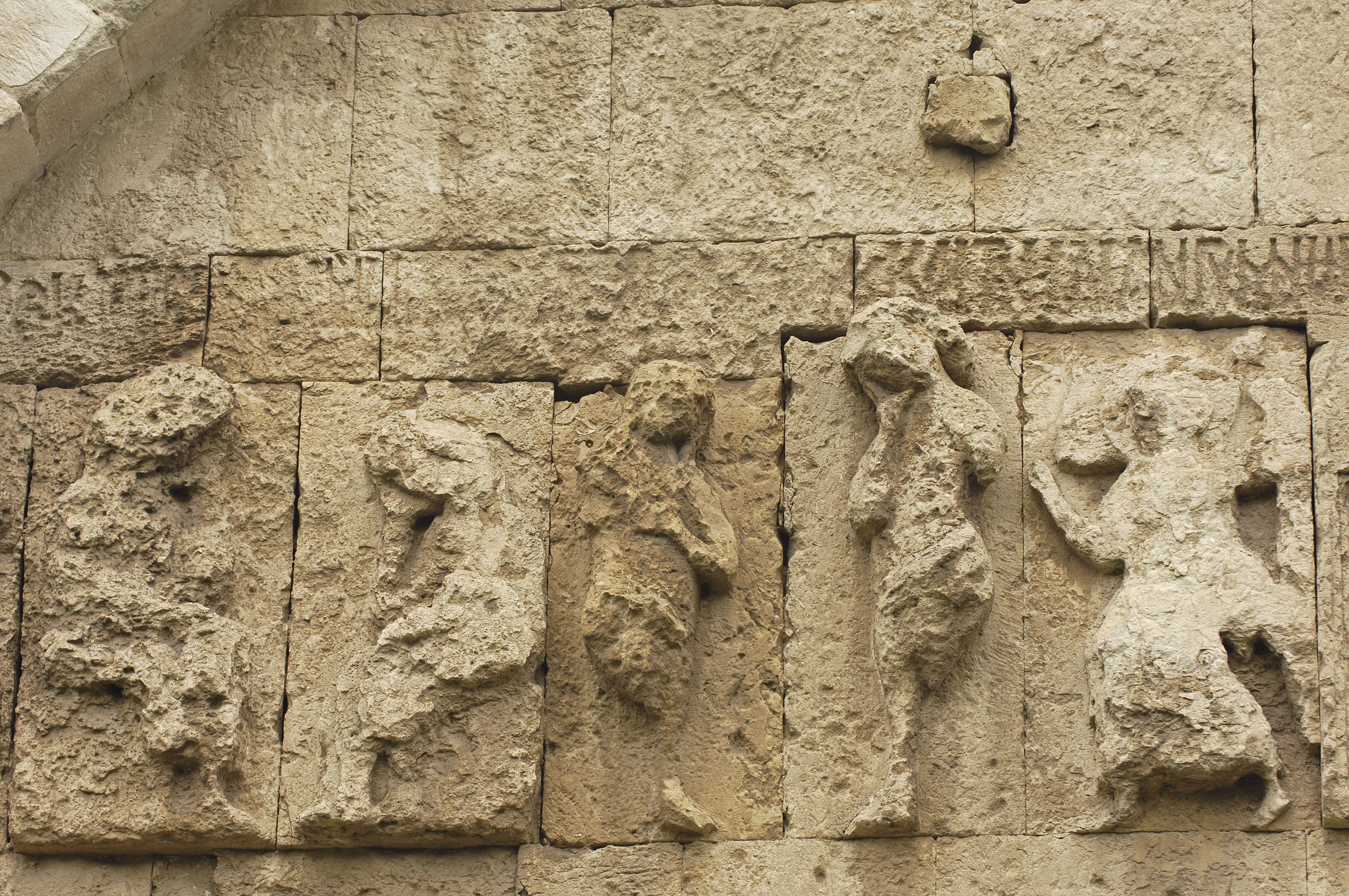
Decoration exterior

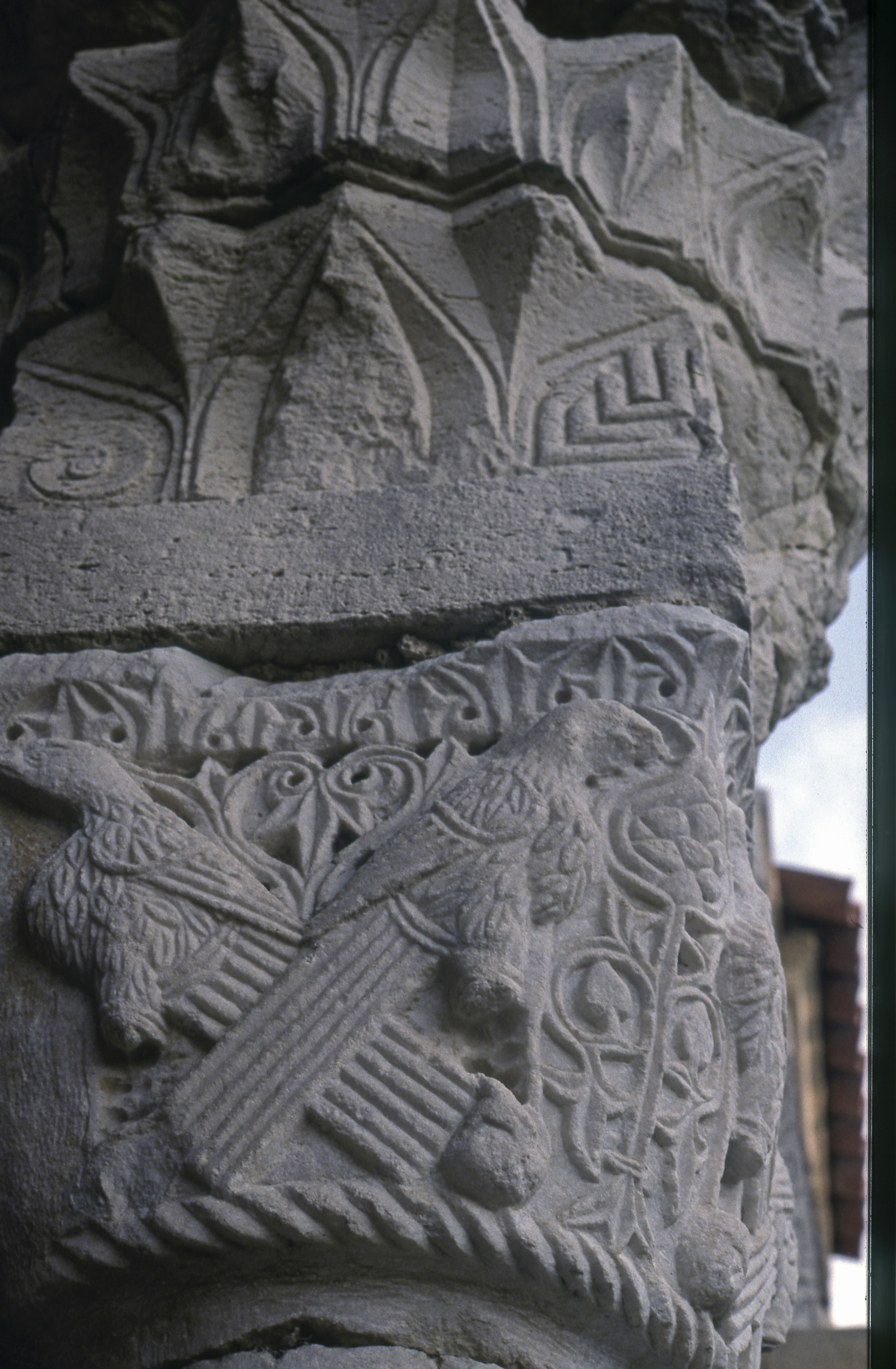
Capital

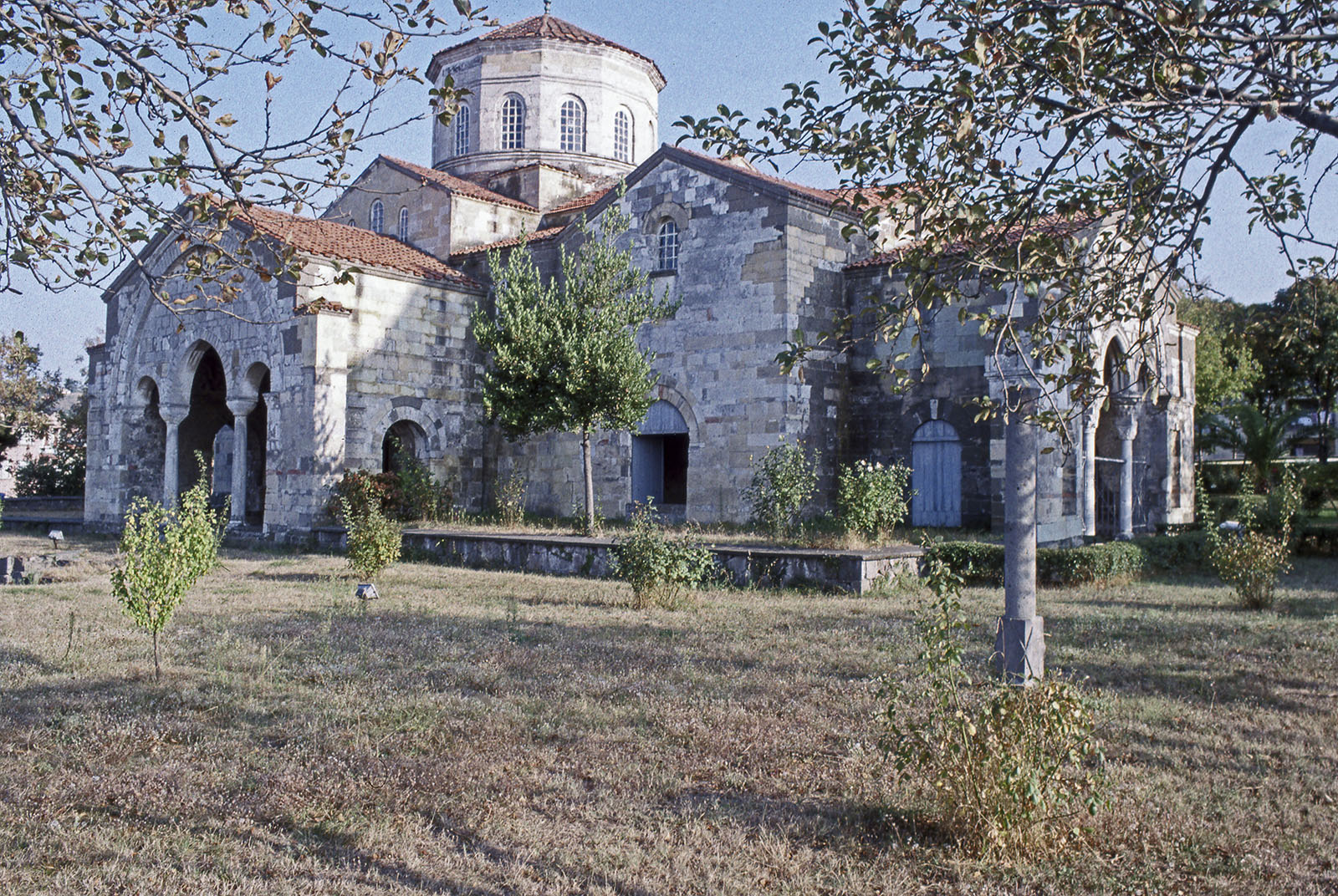
Exterior

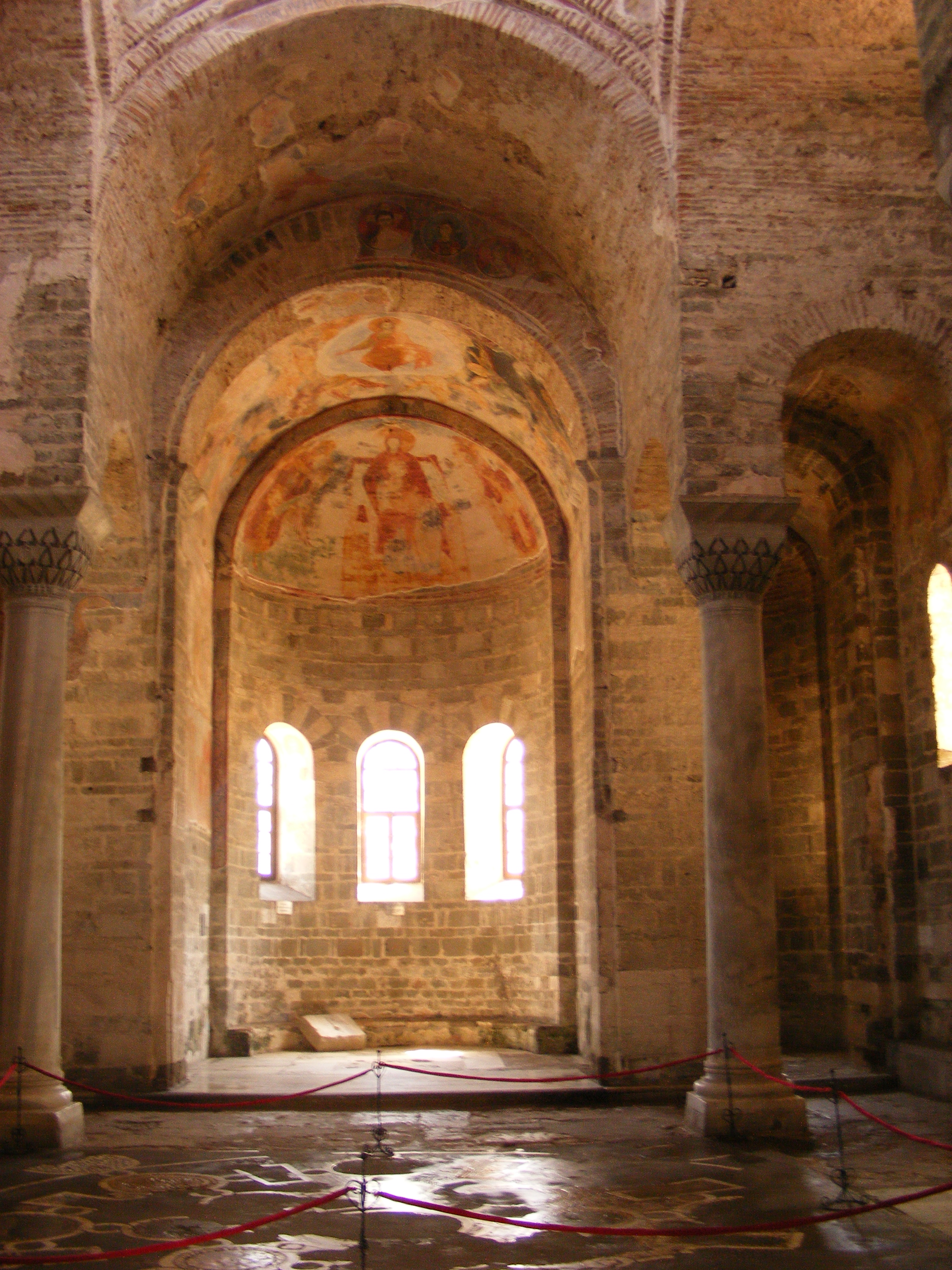
Interior

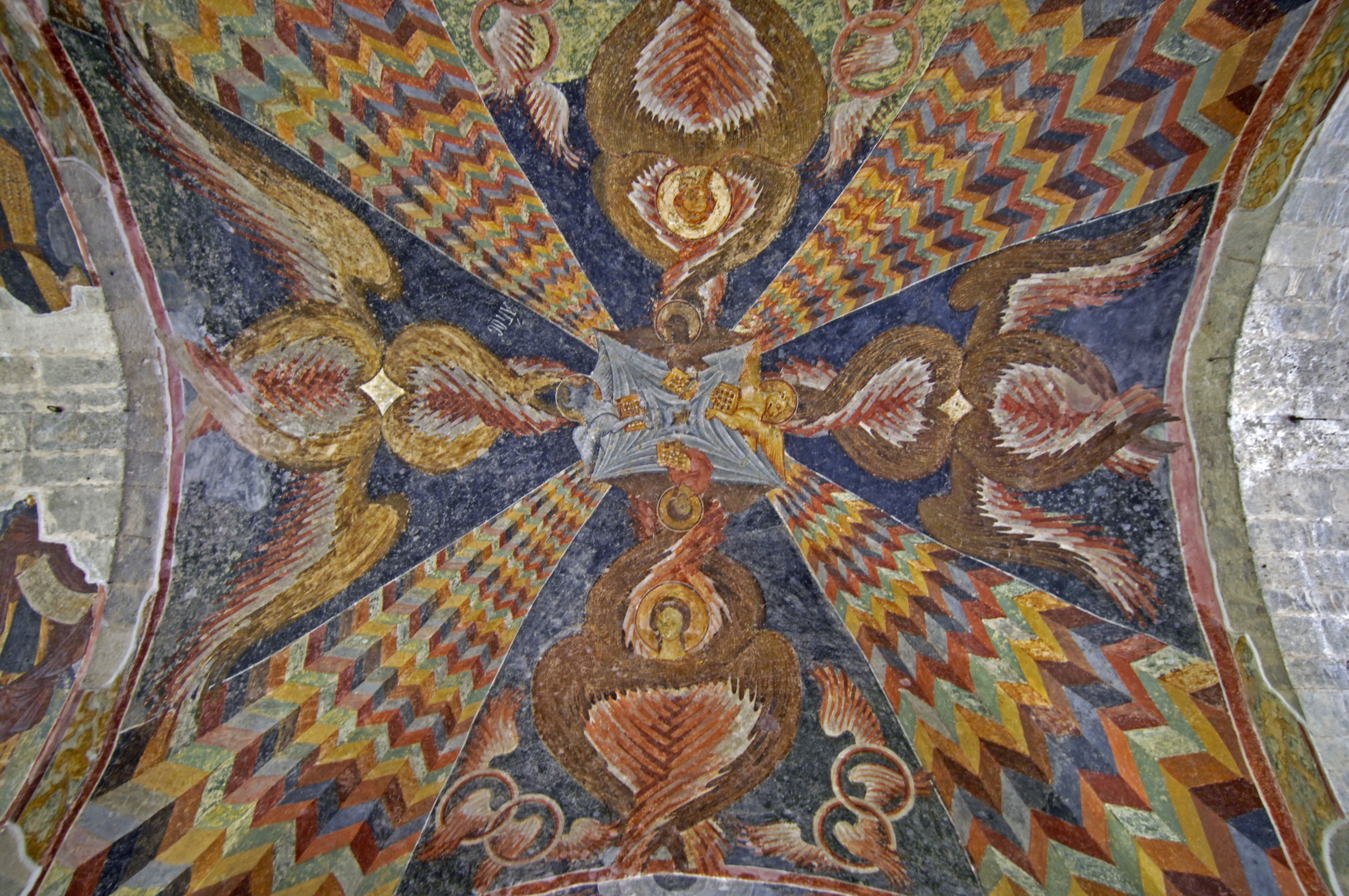
Evangelists' fresco most of it

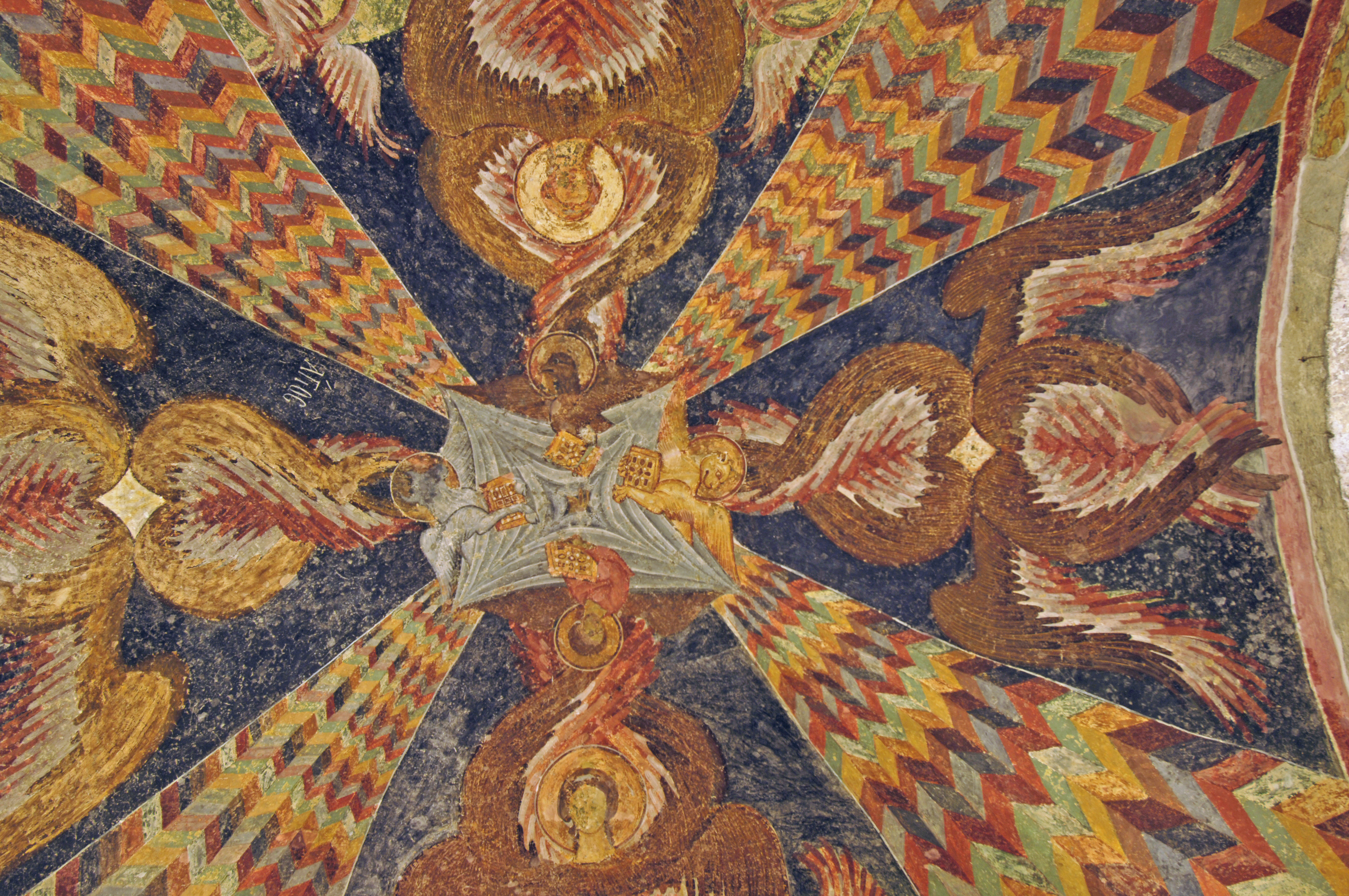
Evangelists' fresco centre

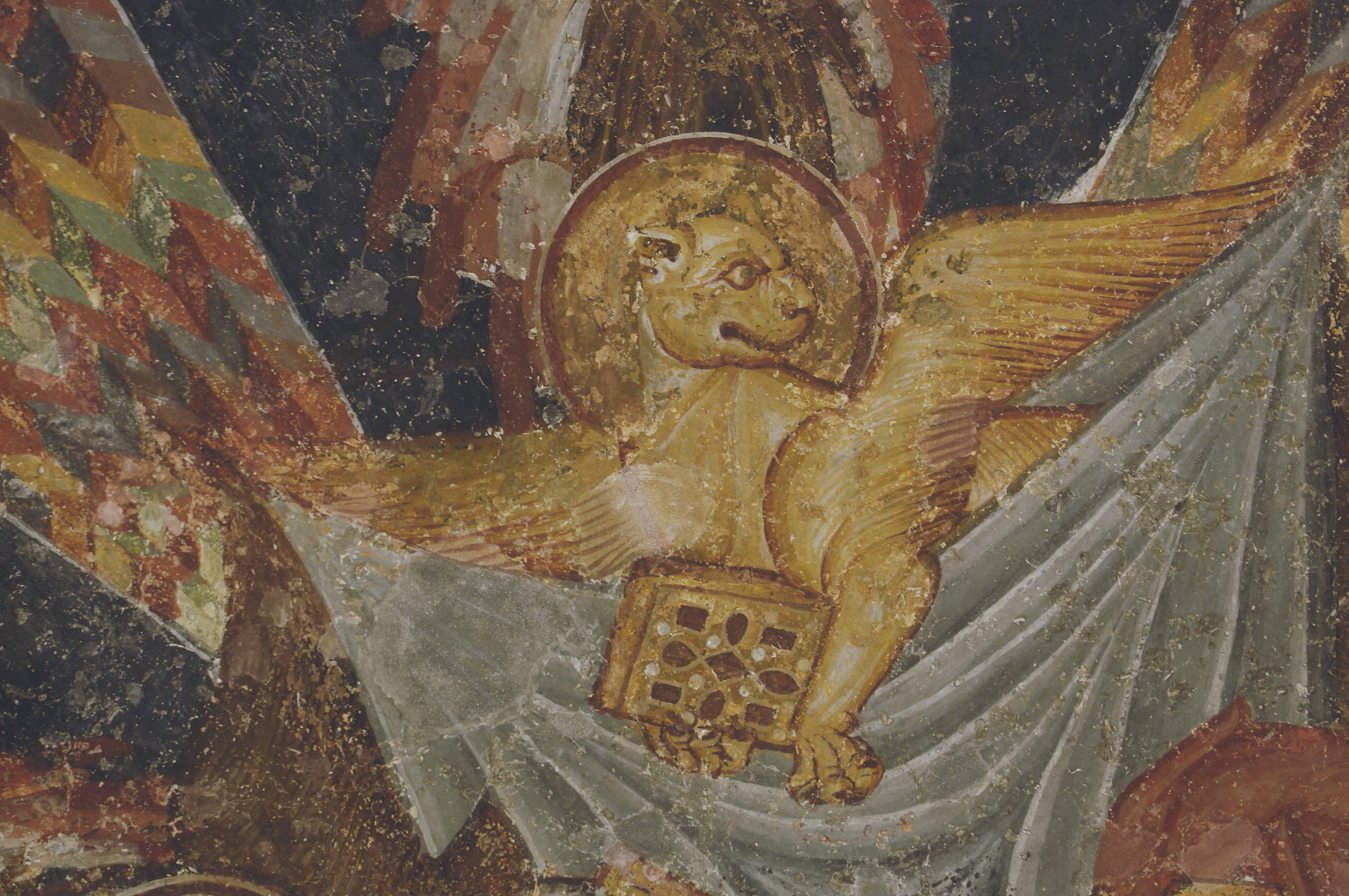
Evangelists' fresco Mark closer up

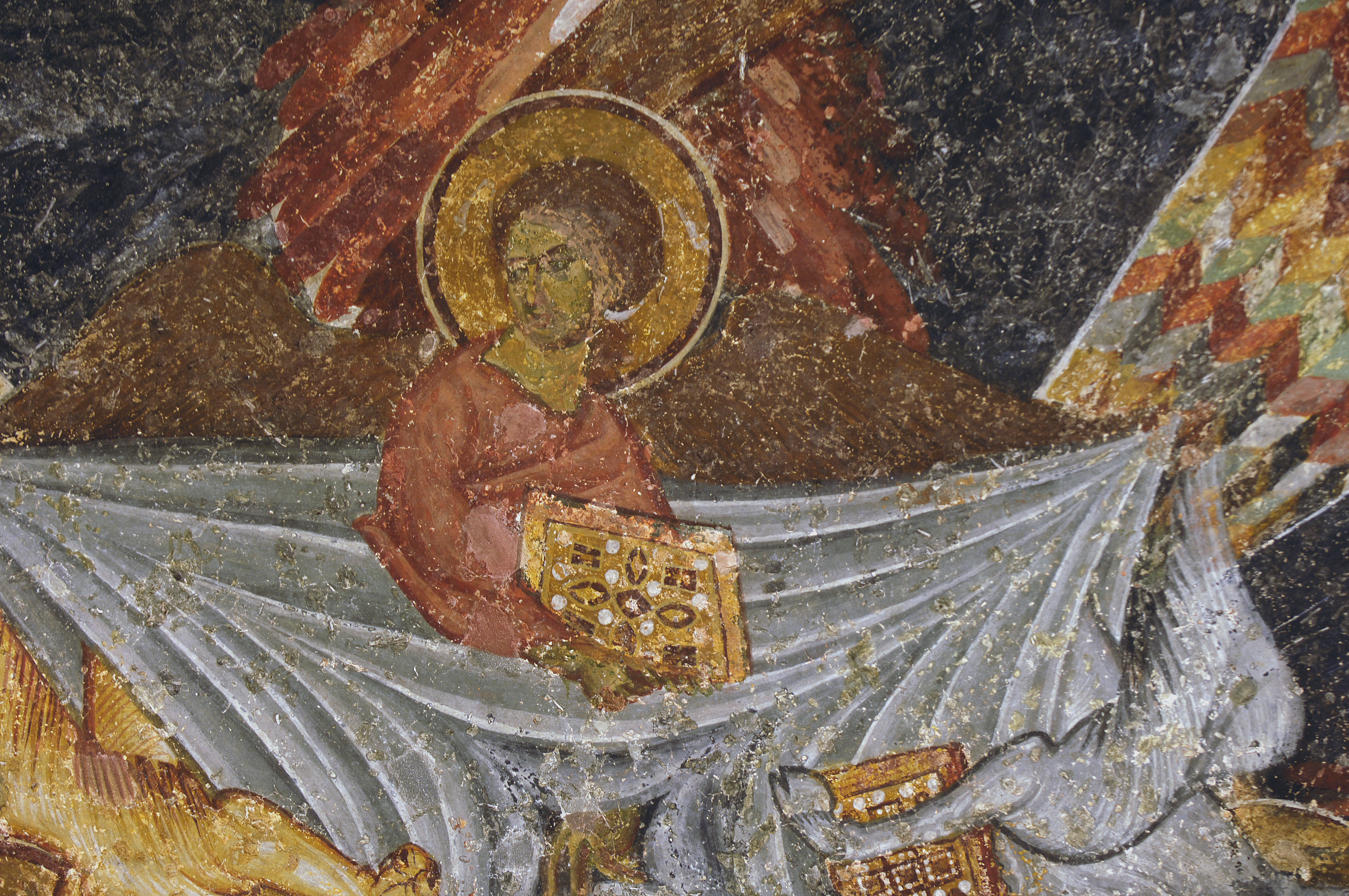
Evangelists' fresco Matthew

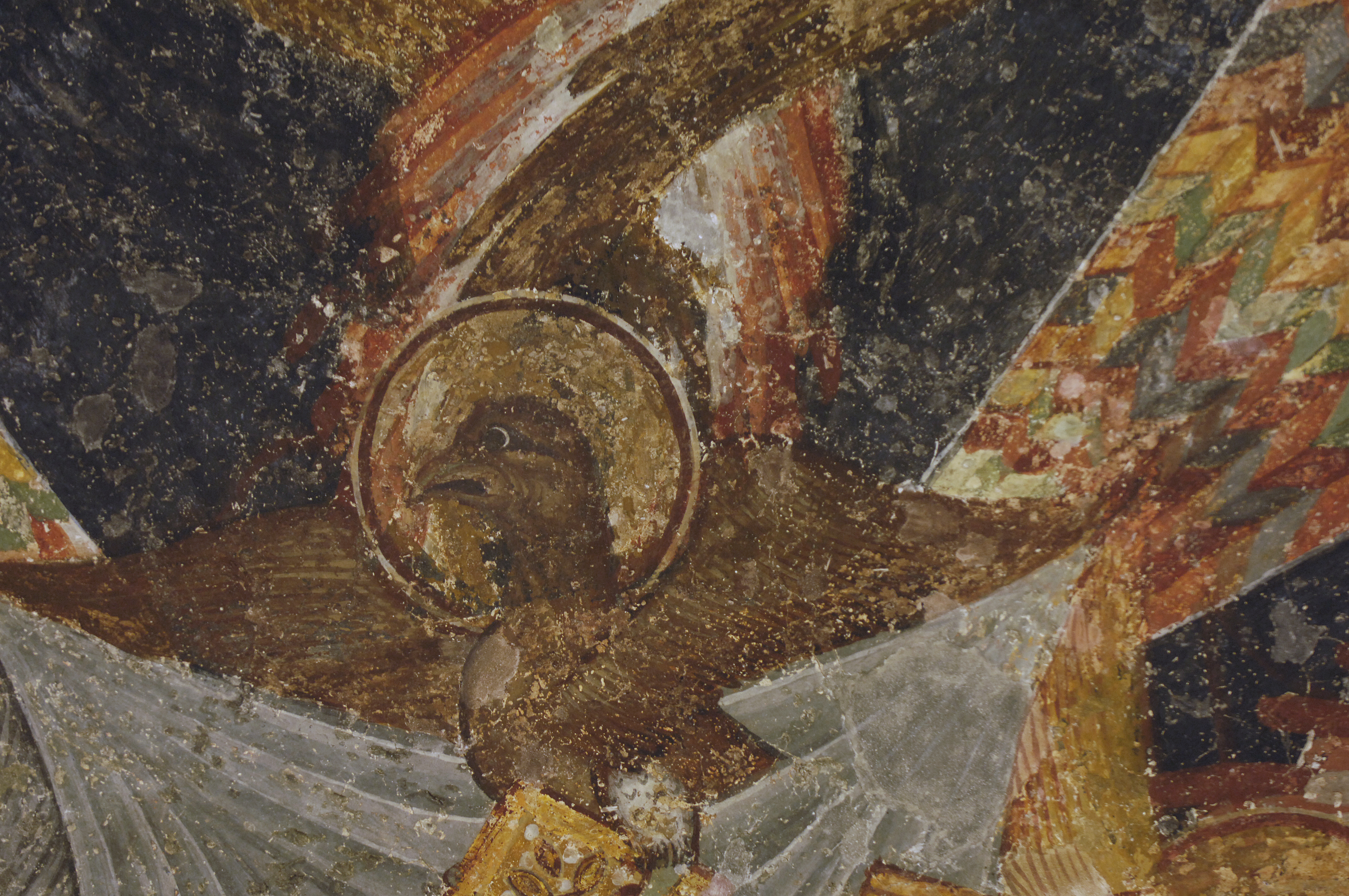
Evangelists' fresco John close up

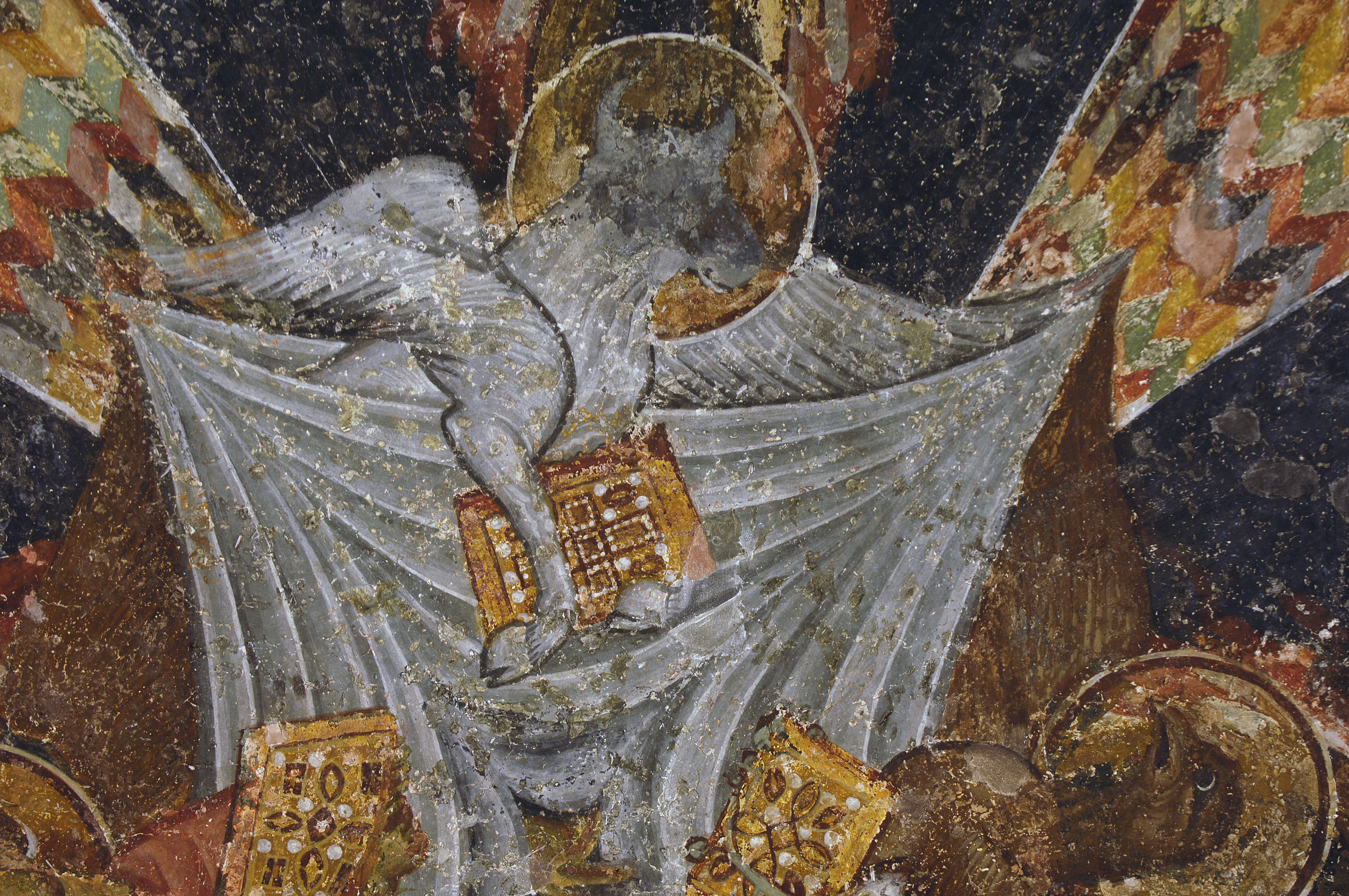
Evangelists' fresco Luke

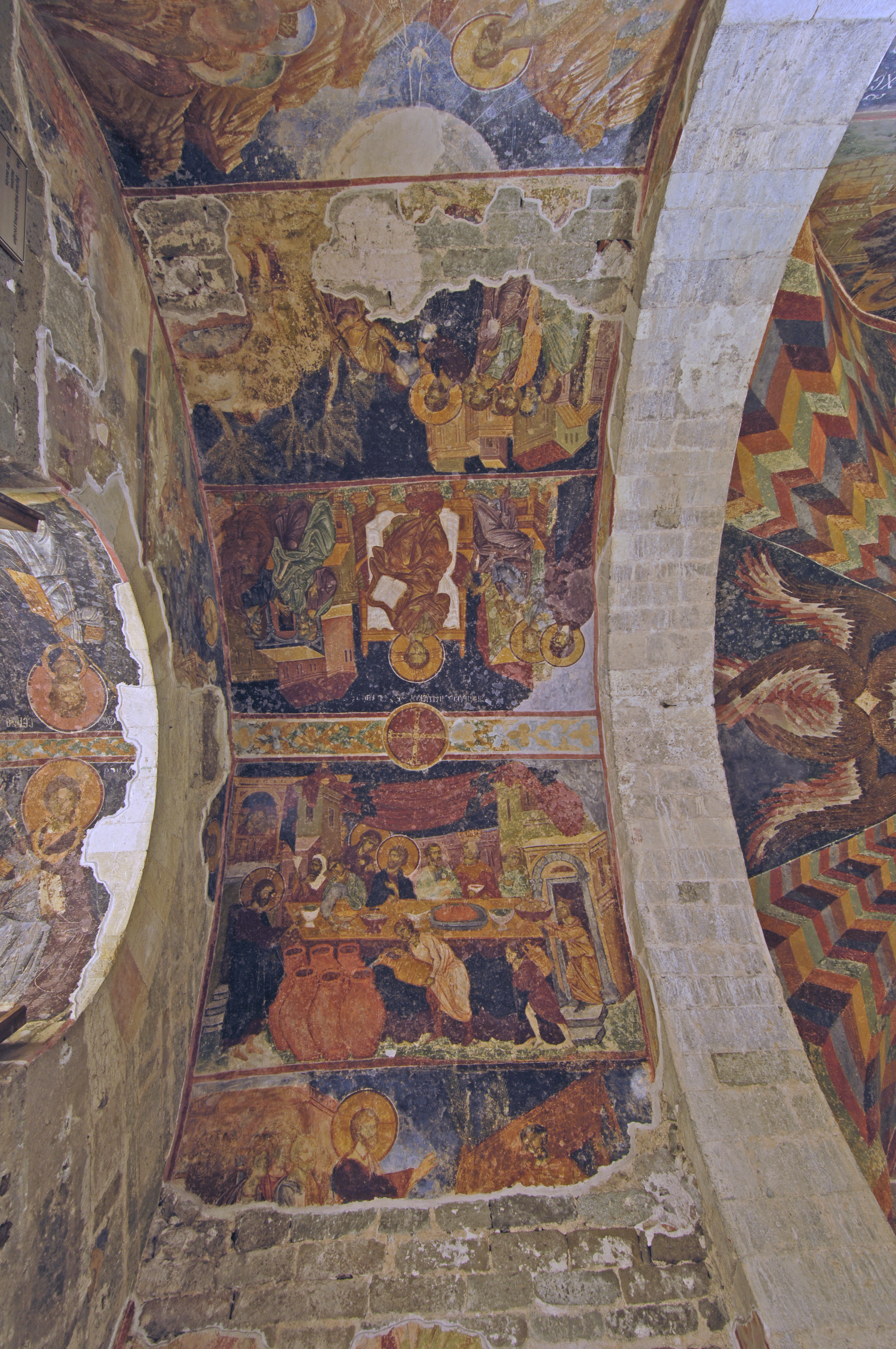
Several scenes

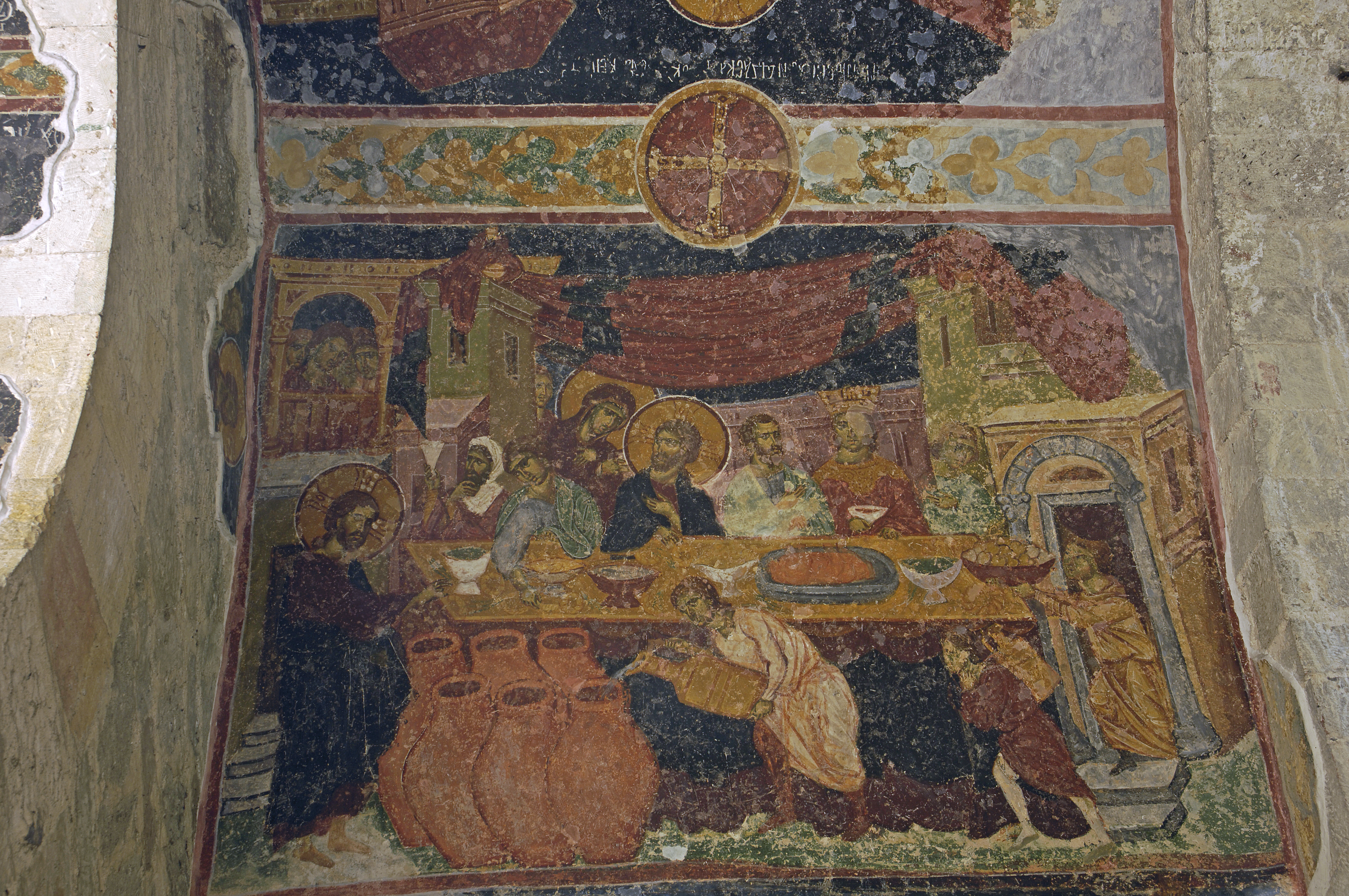
Marriage in Kanaa

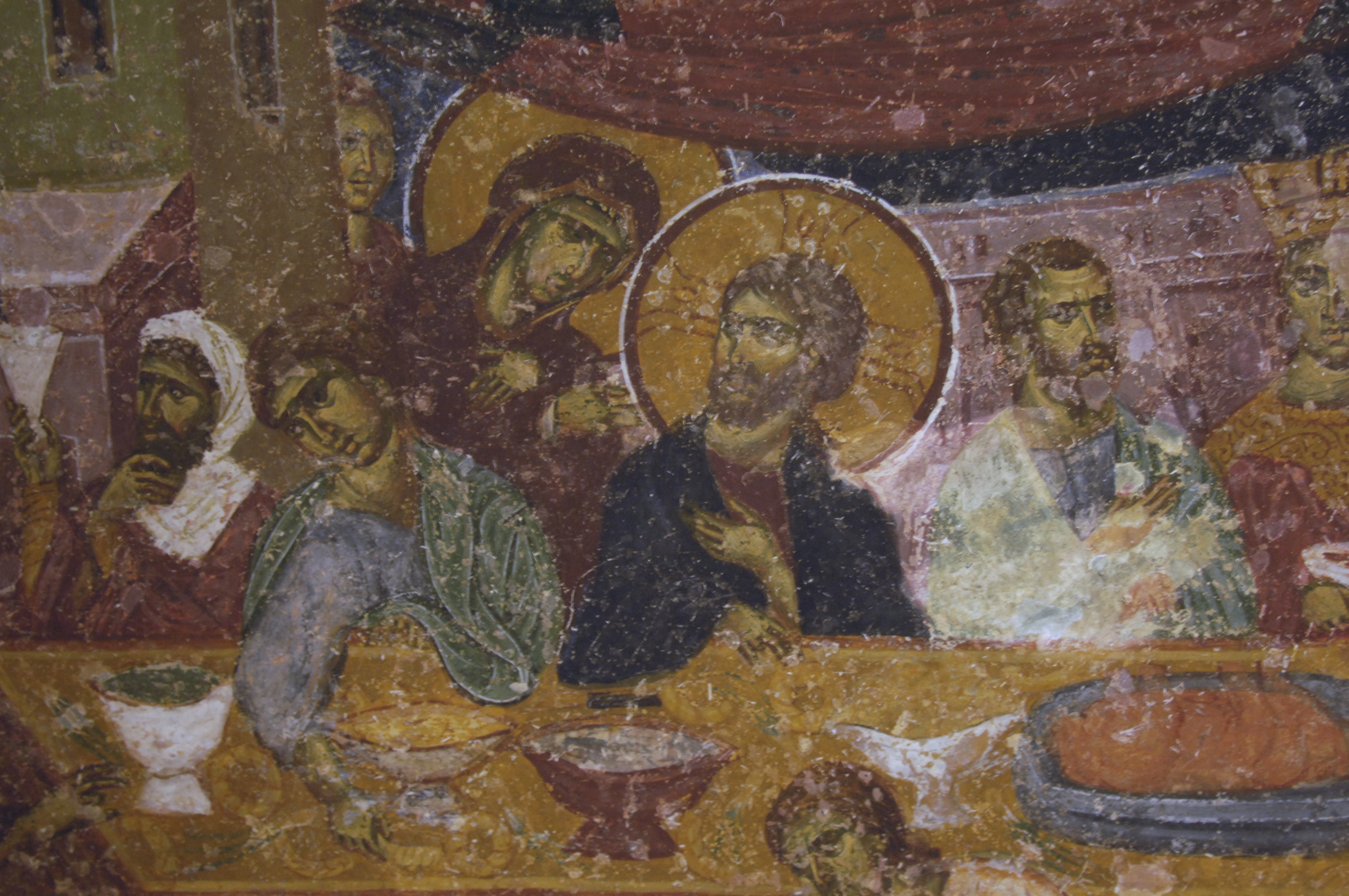
Marriage in Kanaa detail

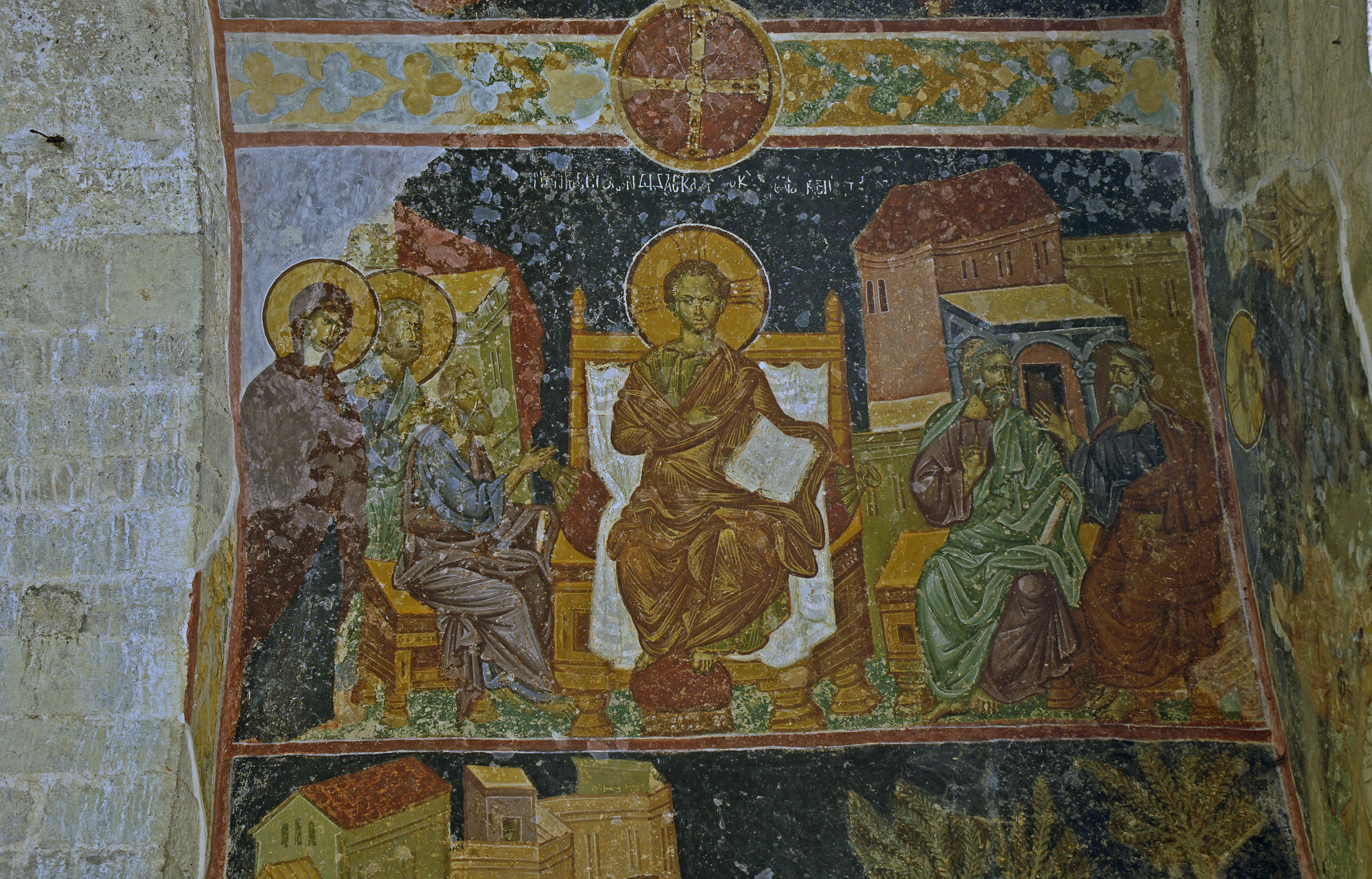
Christ teaching in the temple

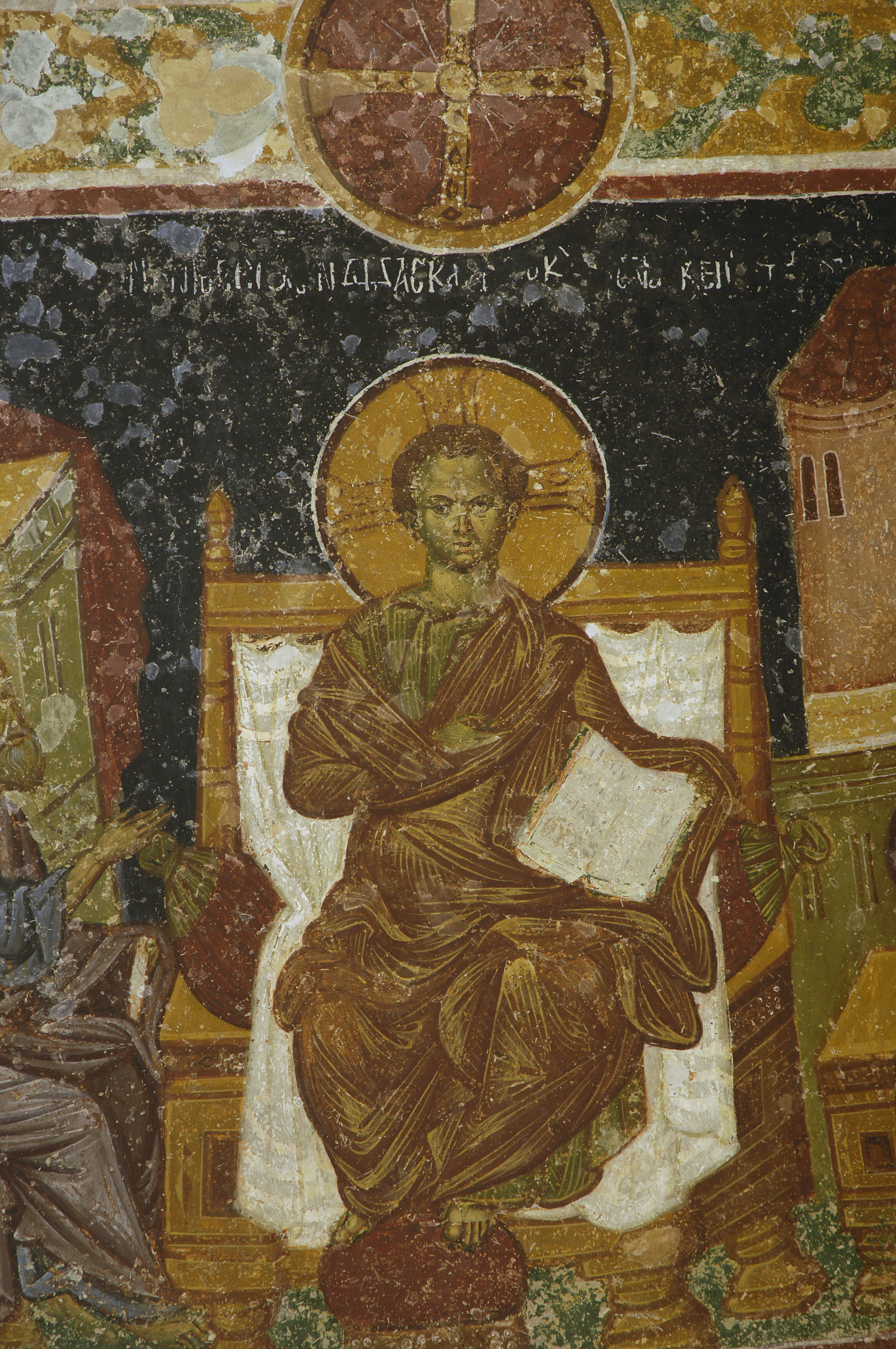
Christ teaching in the temple detail

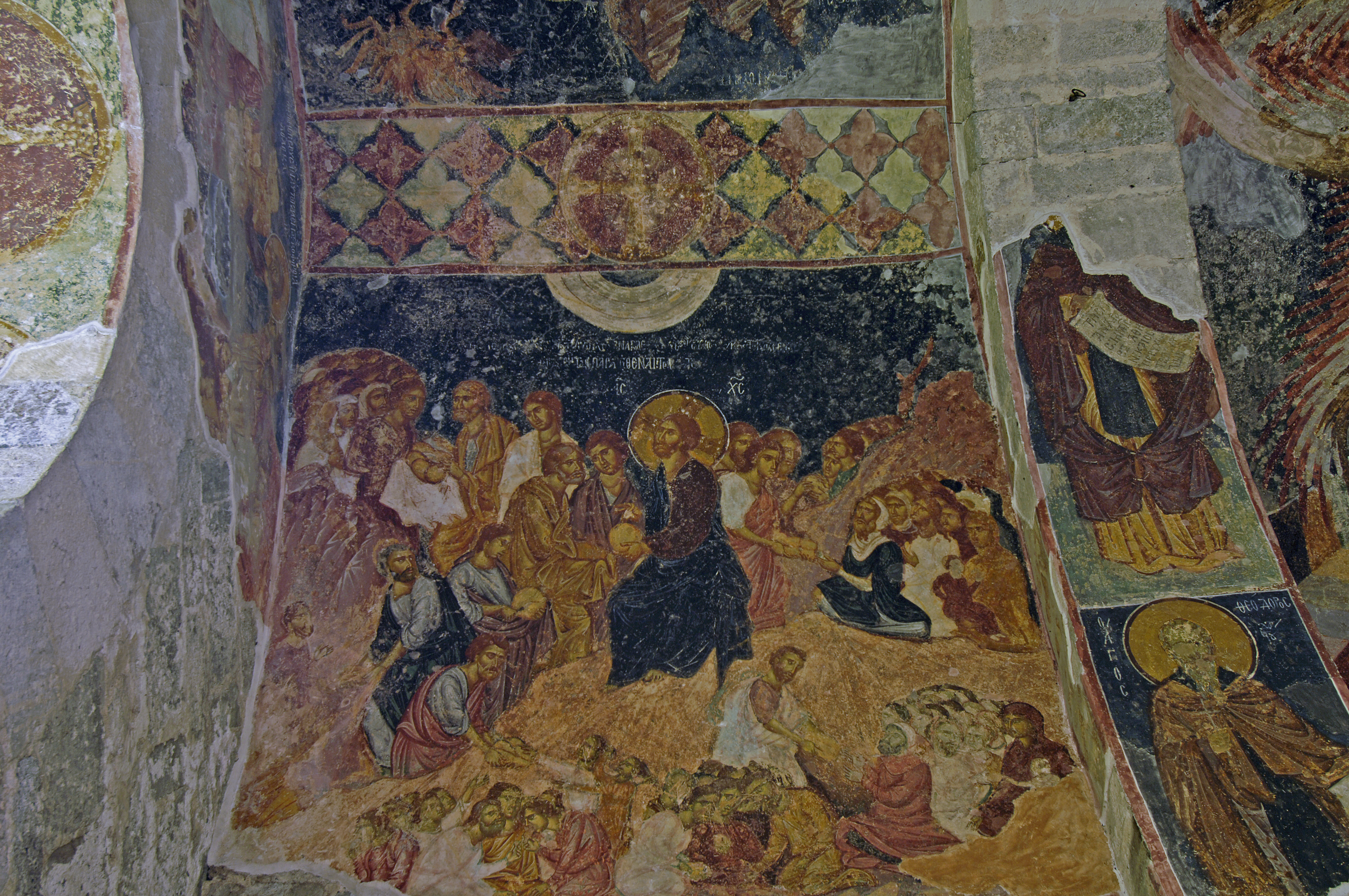
Feeding of the thousands

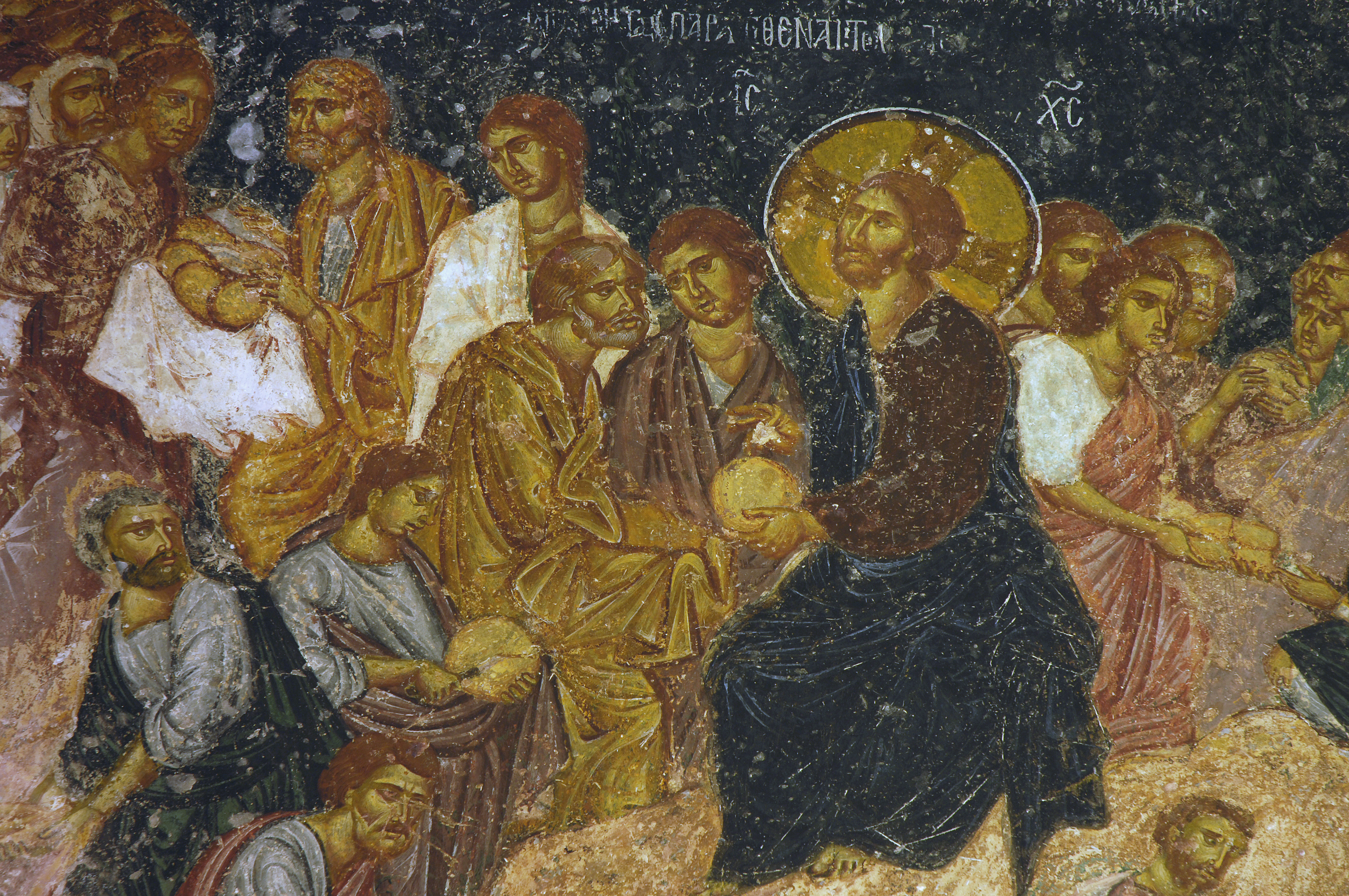
Feeding of the thousands detail

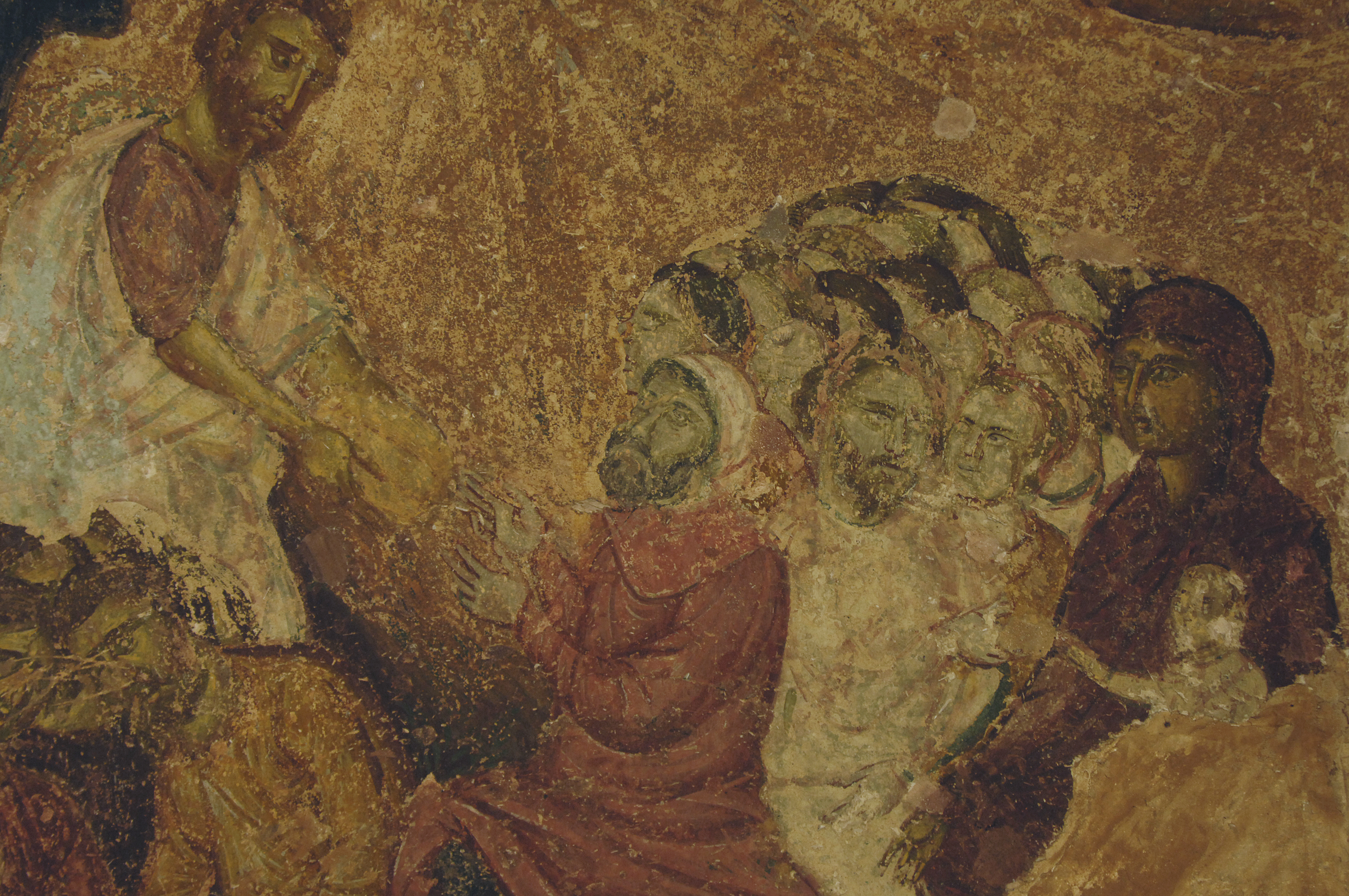
Feeding of the thousands detail

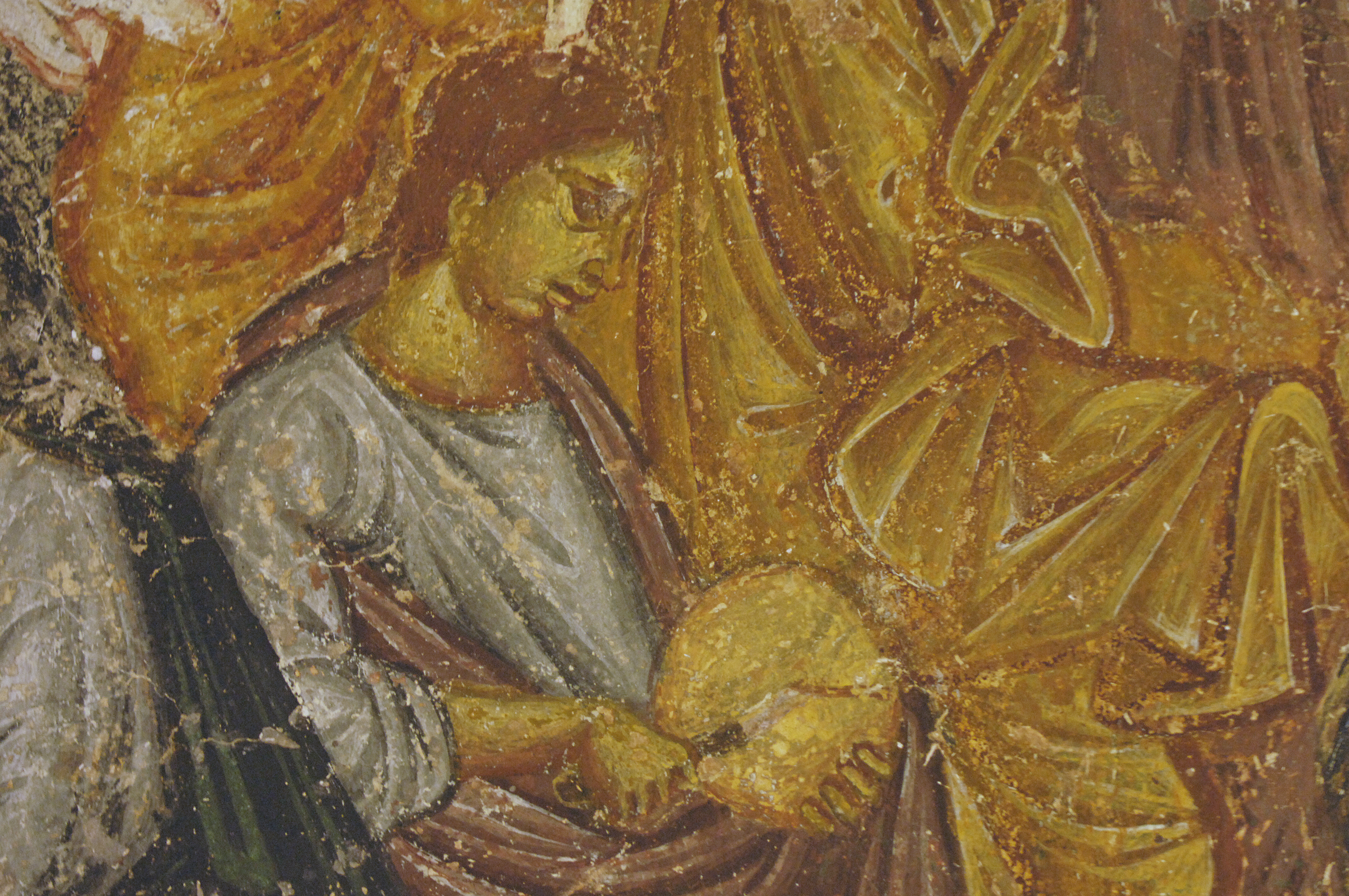
Feeding of the thousands detail

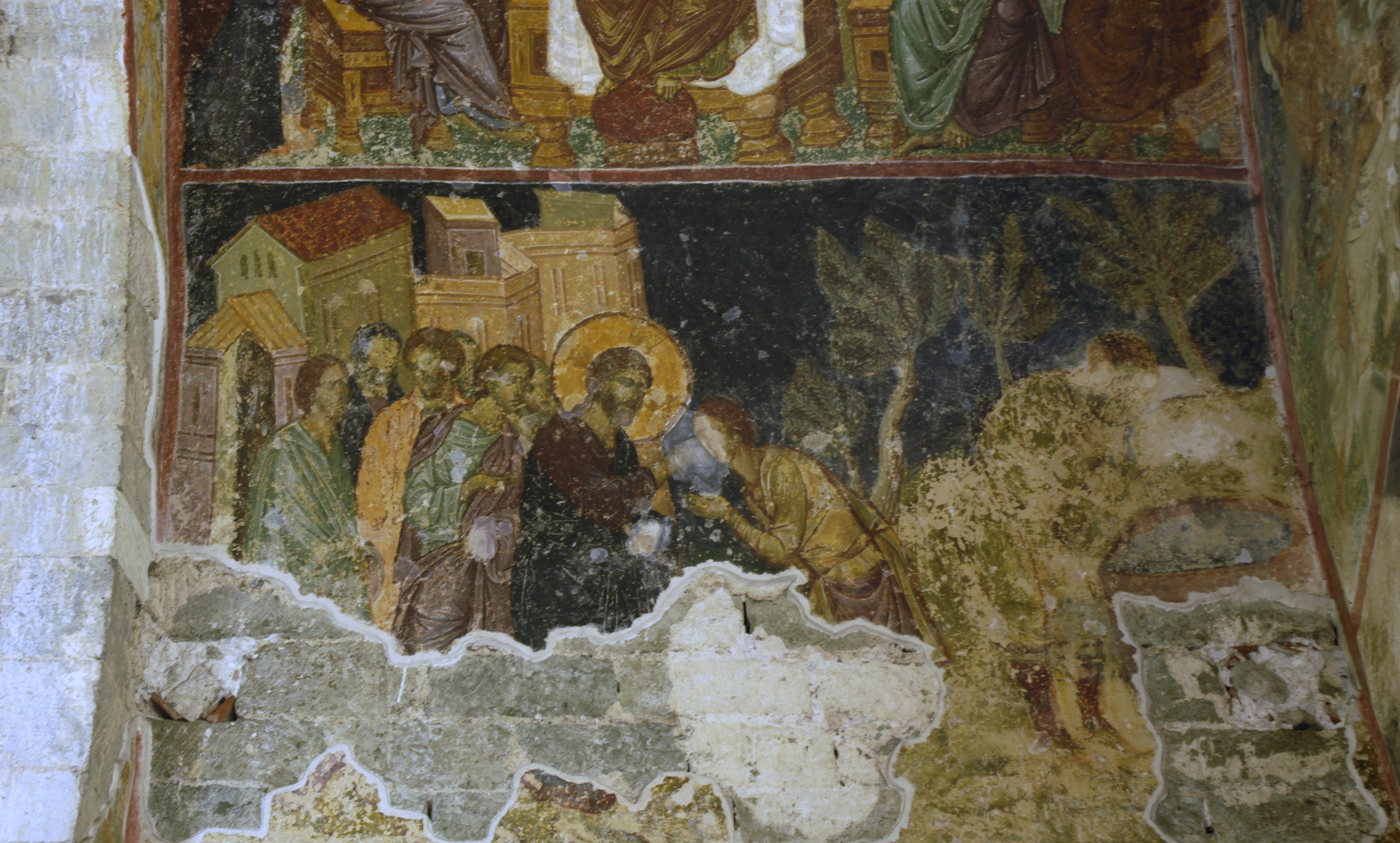
Healing of the blind man at the pool of Siloam

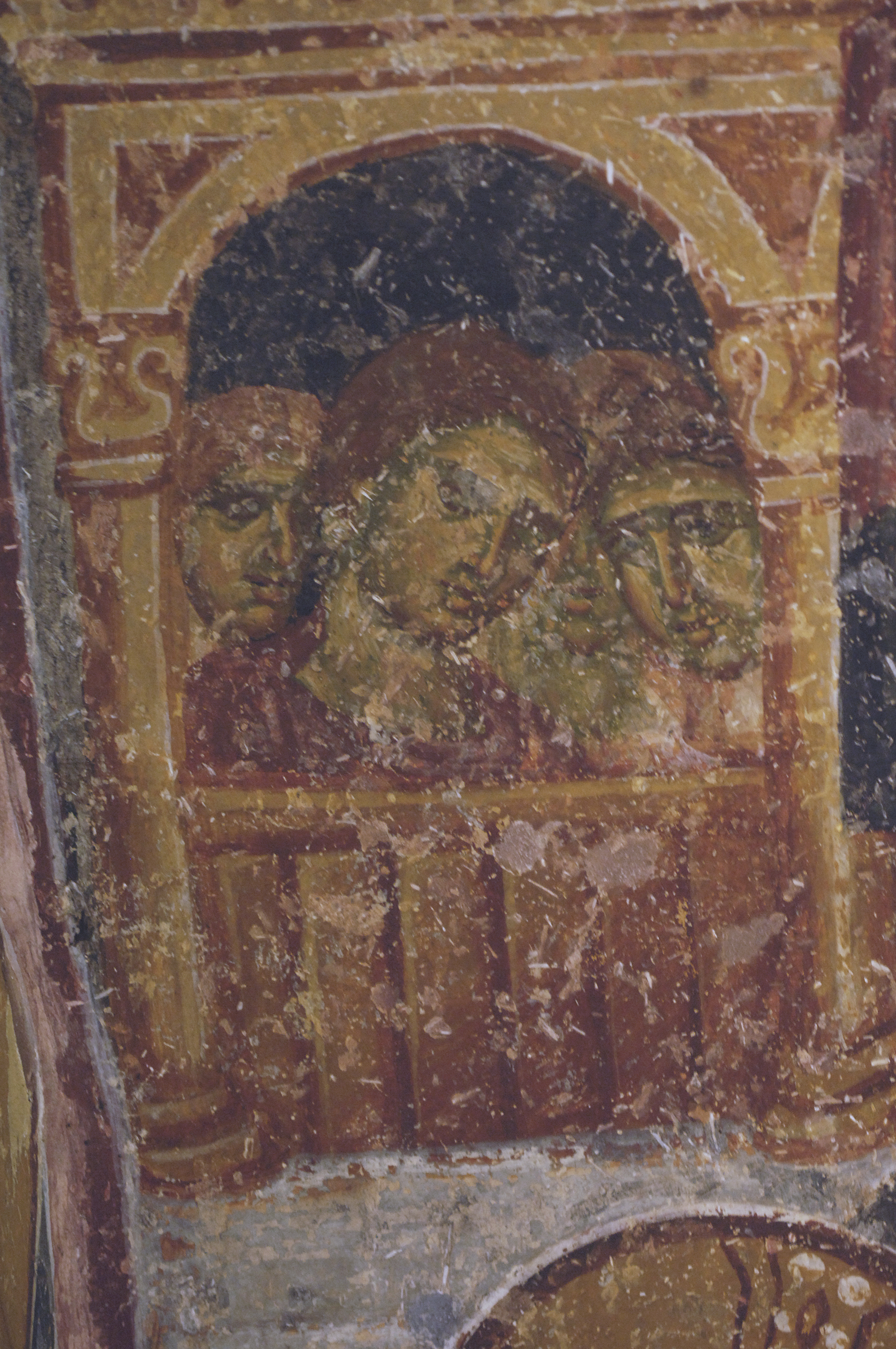
Unidentified fresco

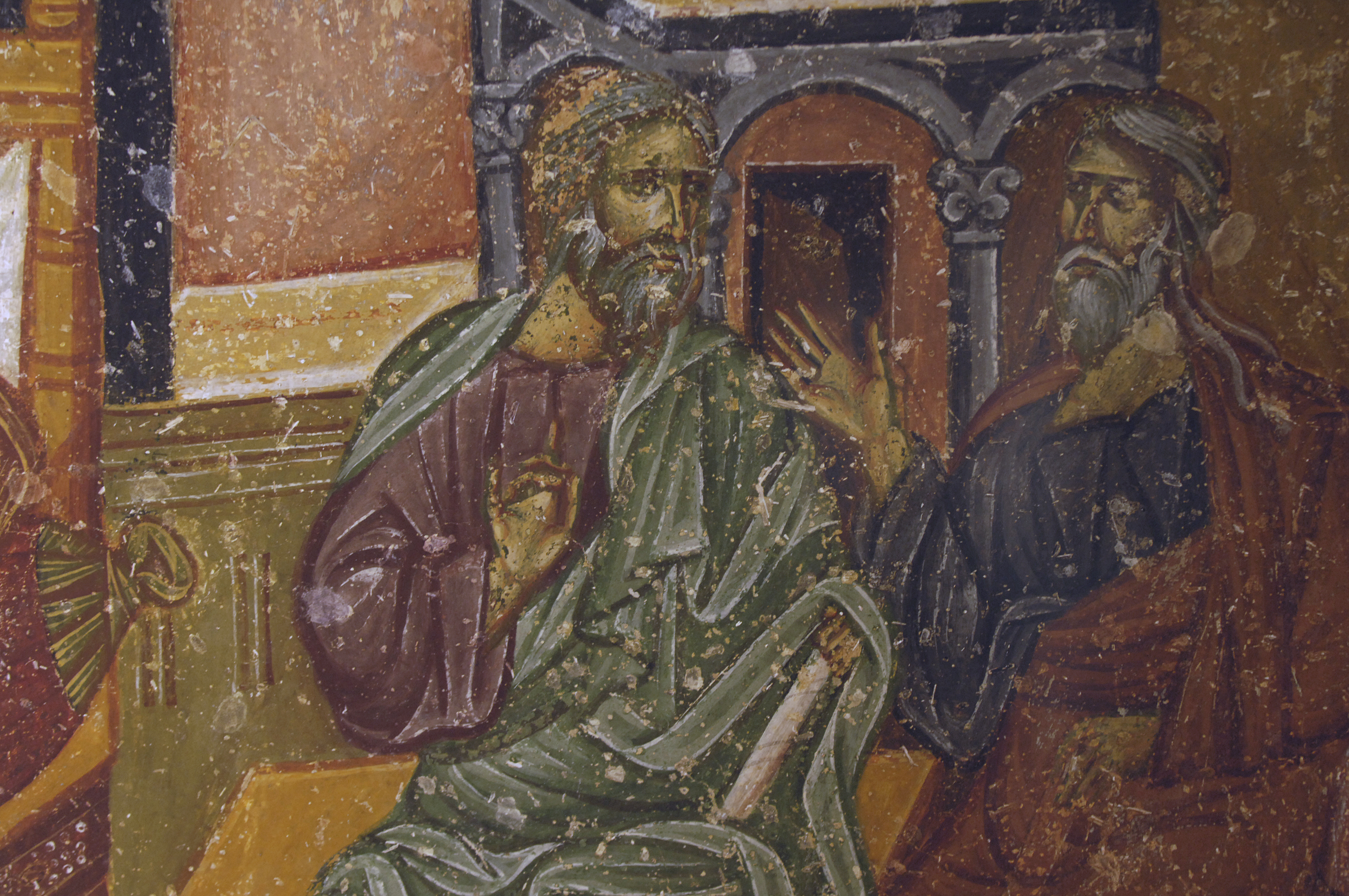
Unidentified scene

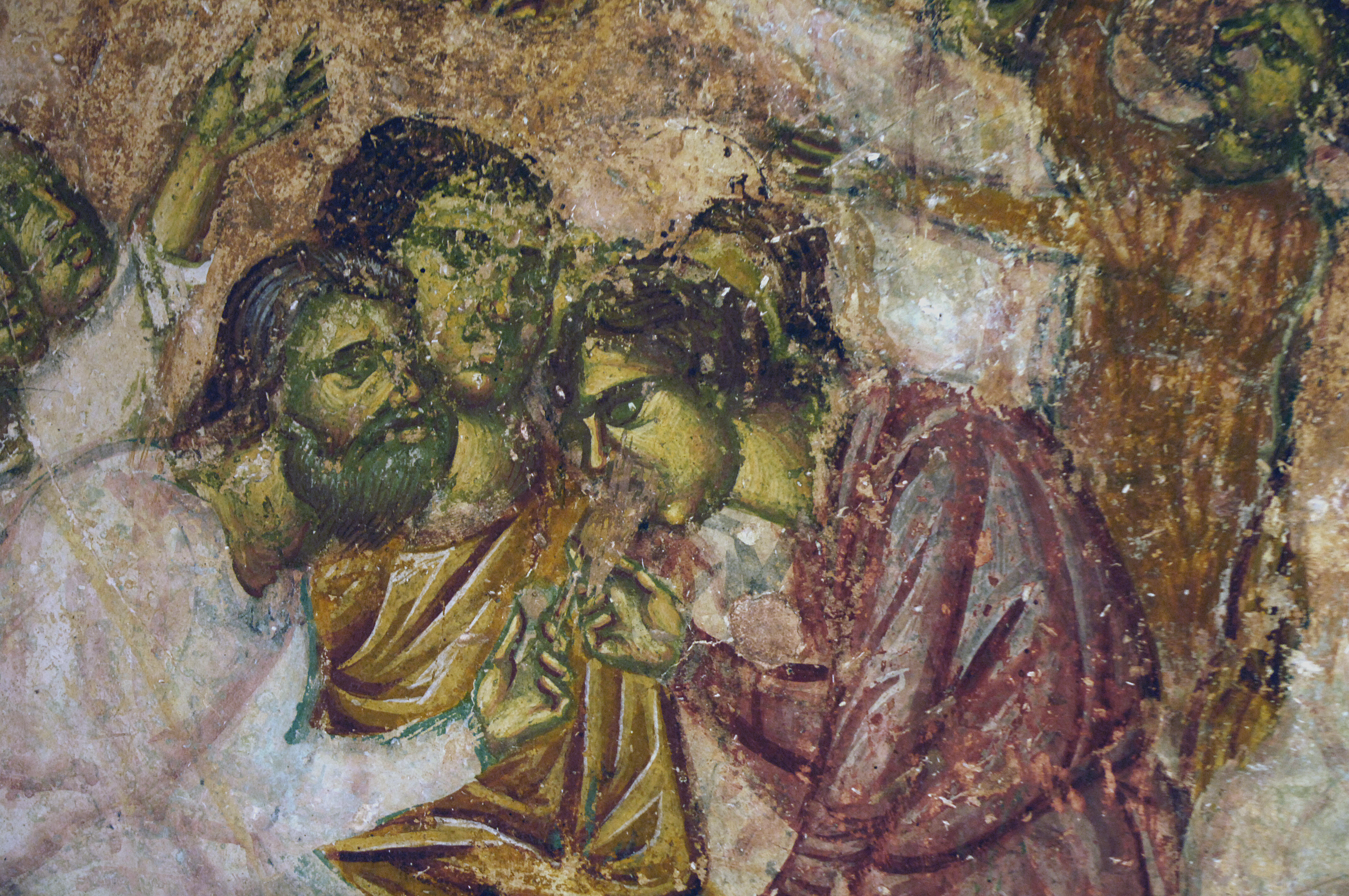
Unidentified scene

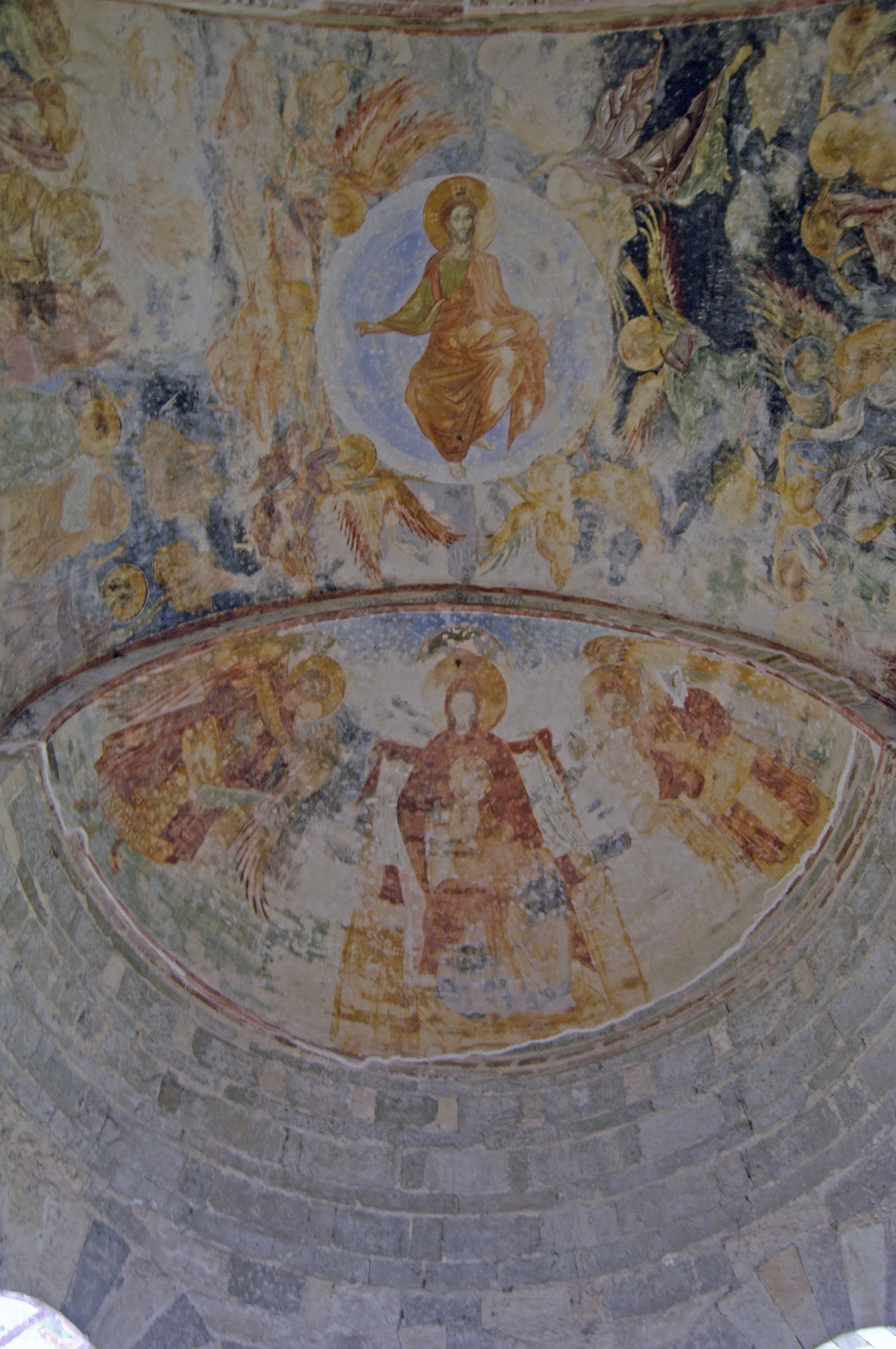
Mary and Christ

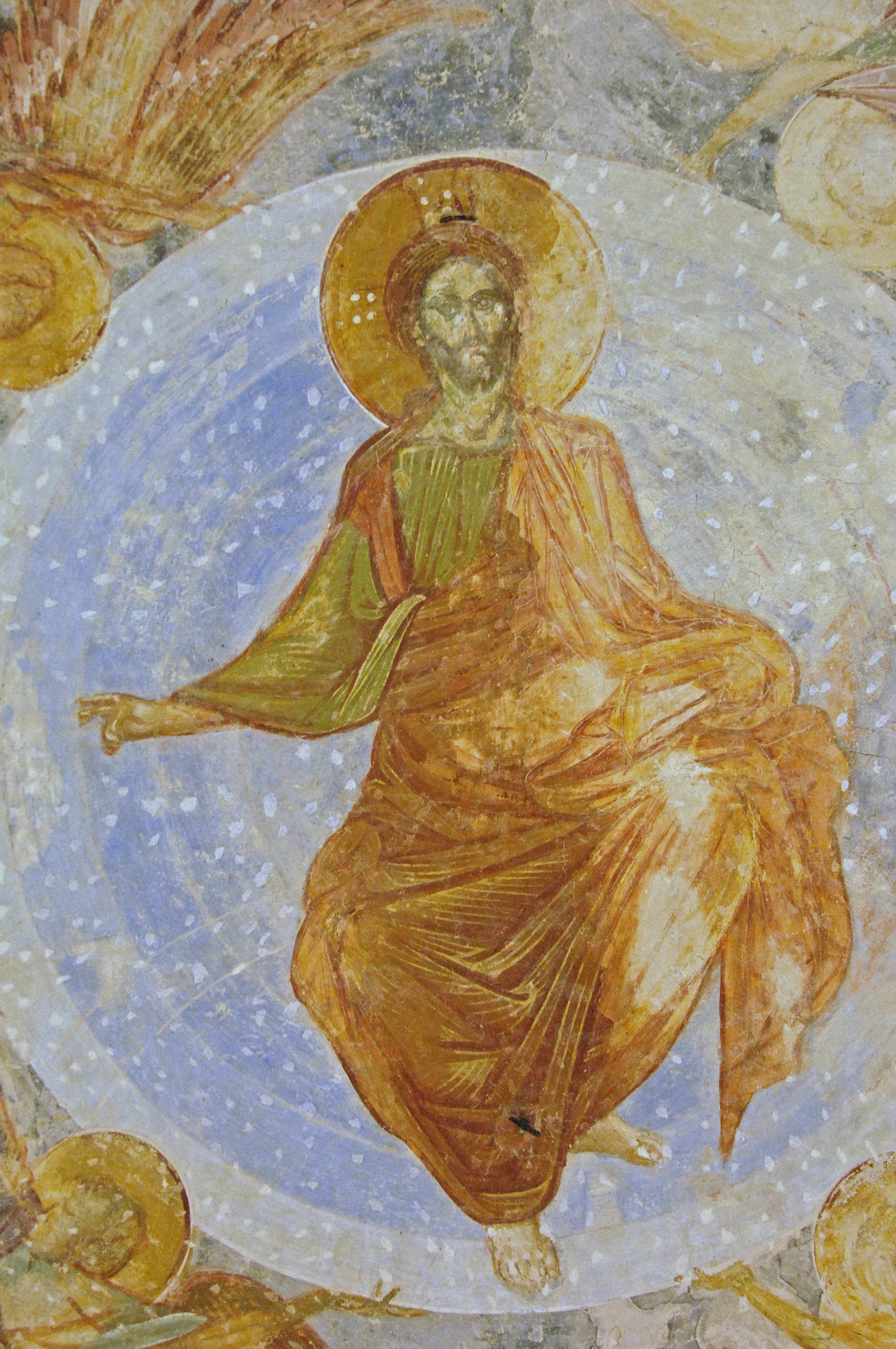
Mary and Christ detail with Christ

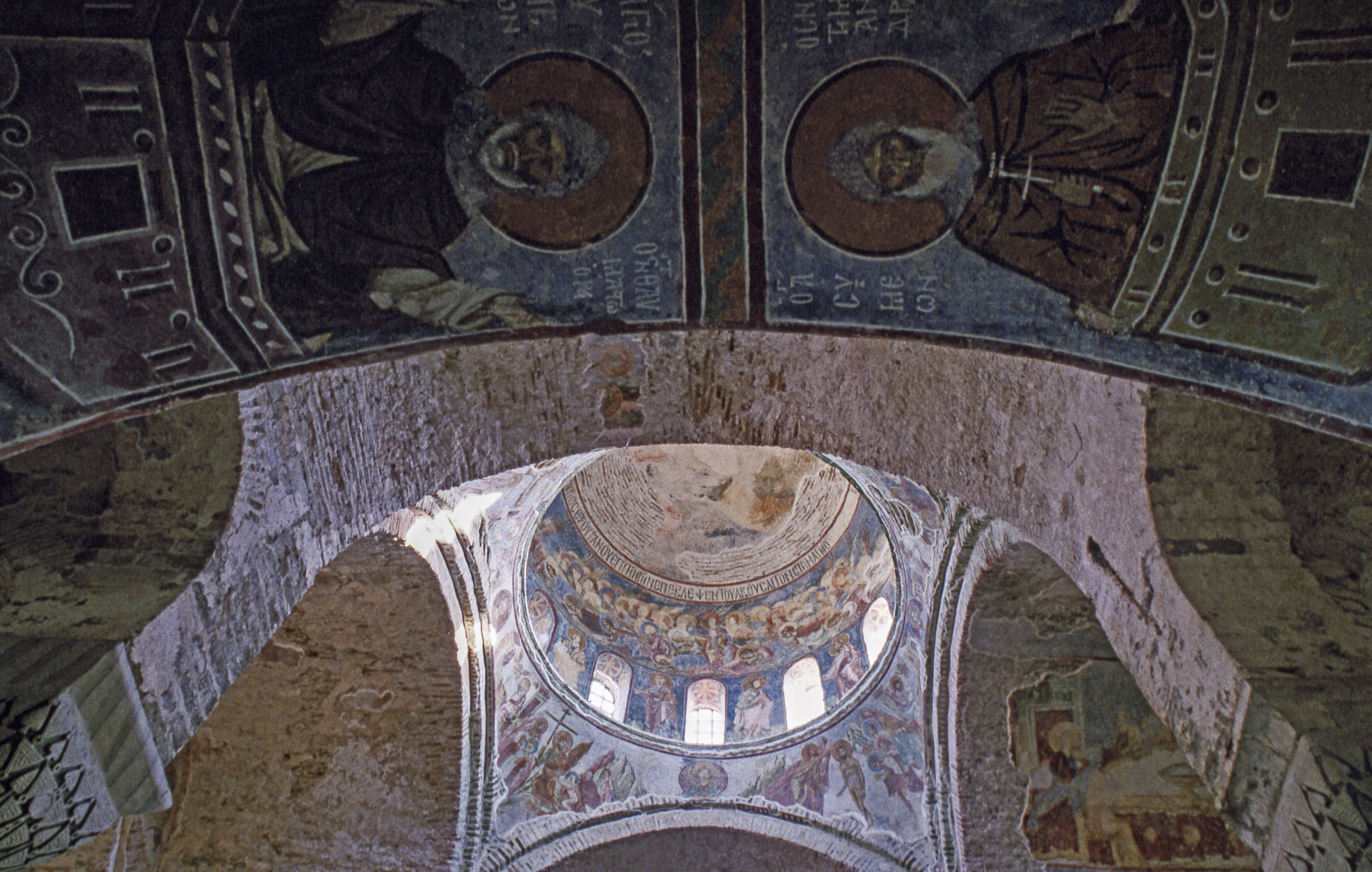
Interior

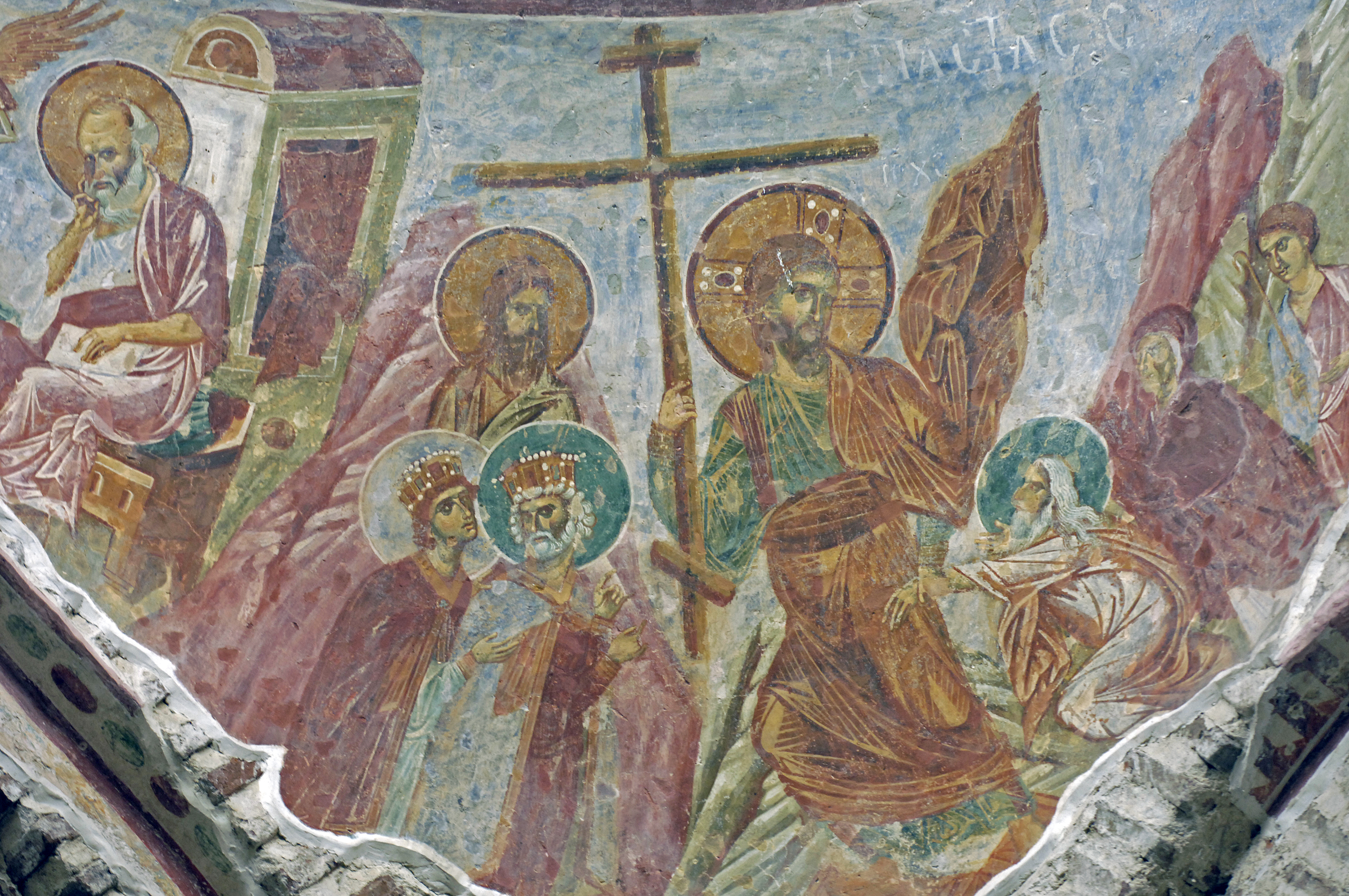
Descent into hell (Resurrection of Christ)

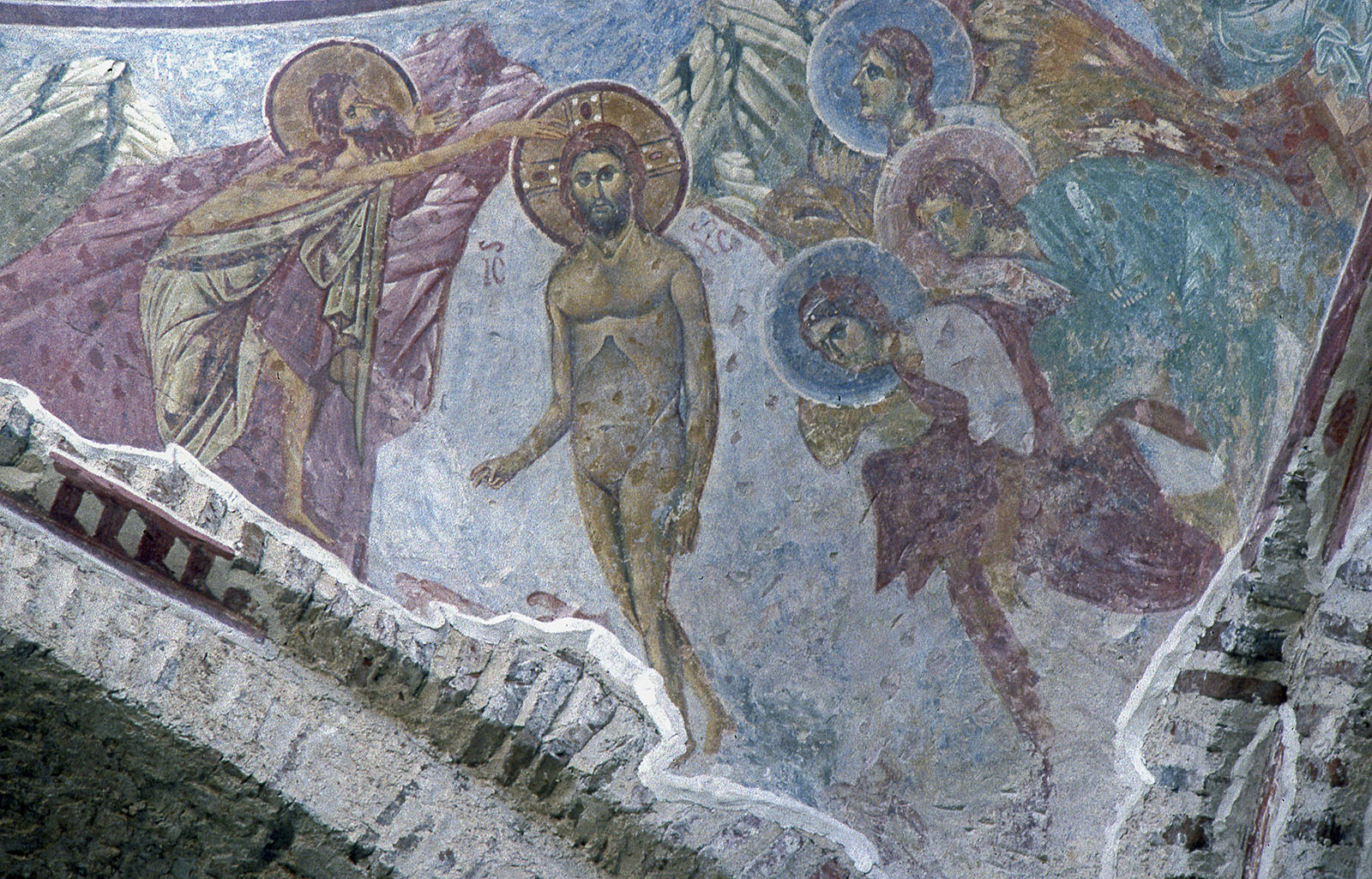
Baptism of Christ

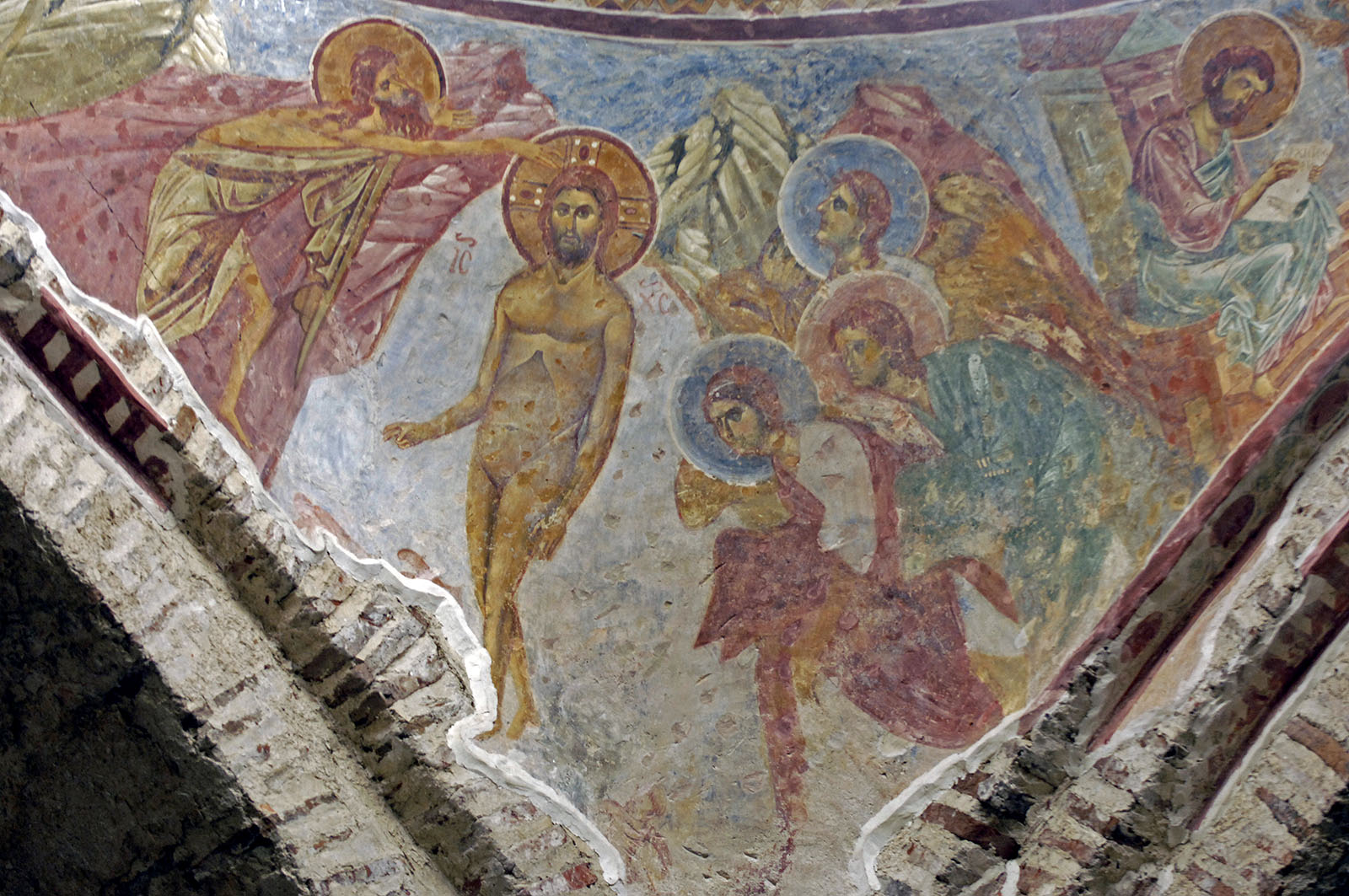
Baptism of Christ

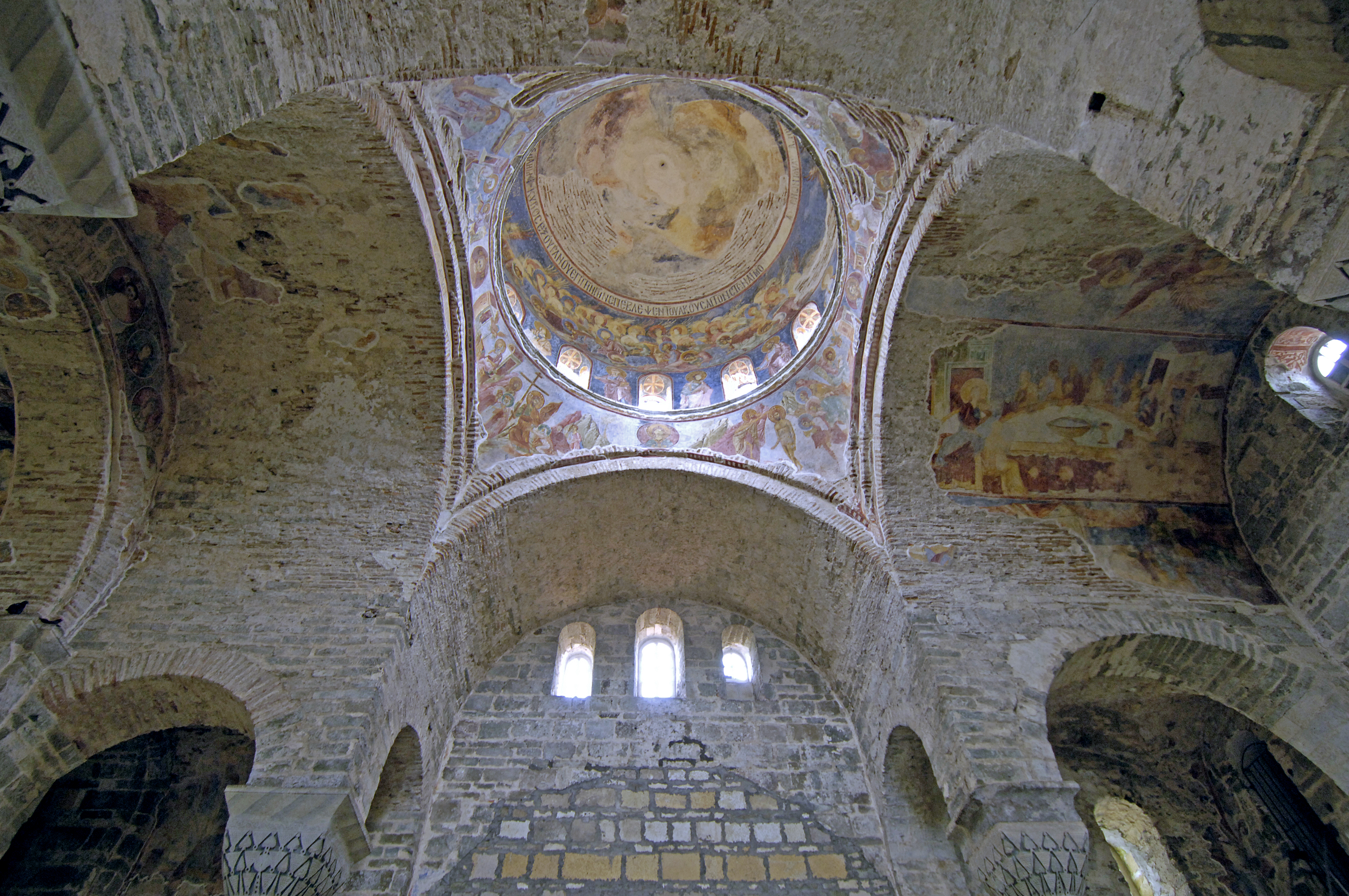
Interior

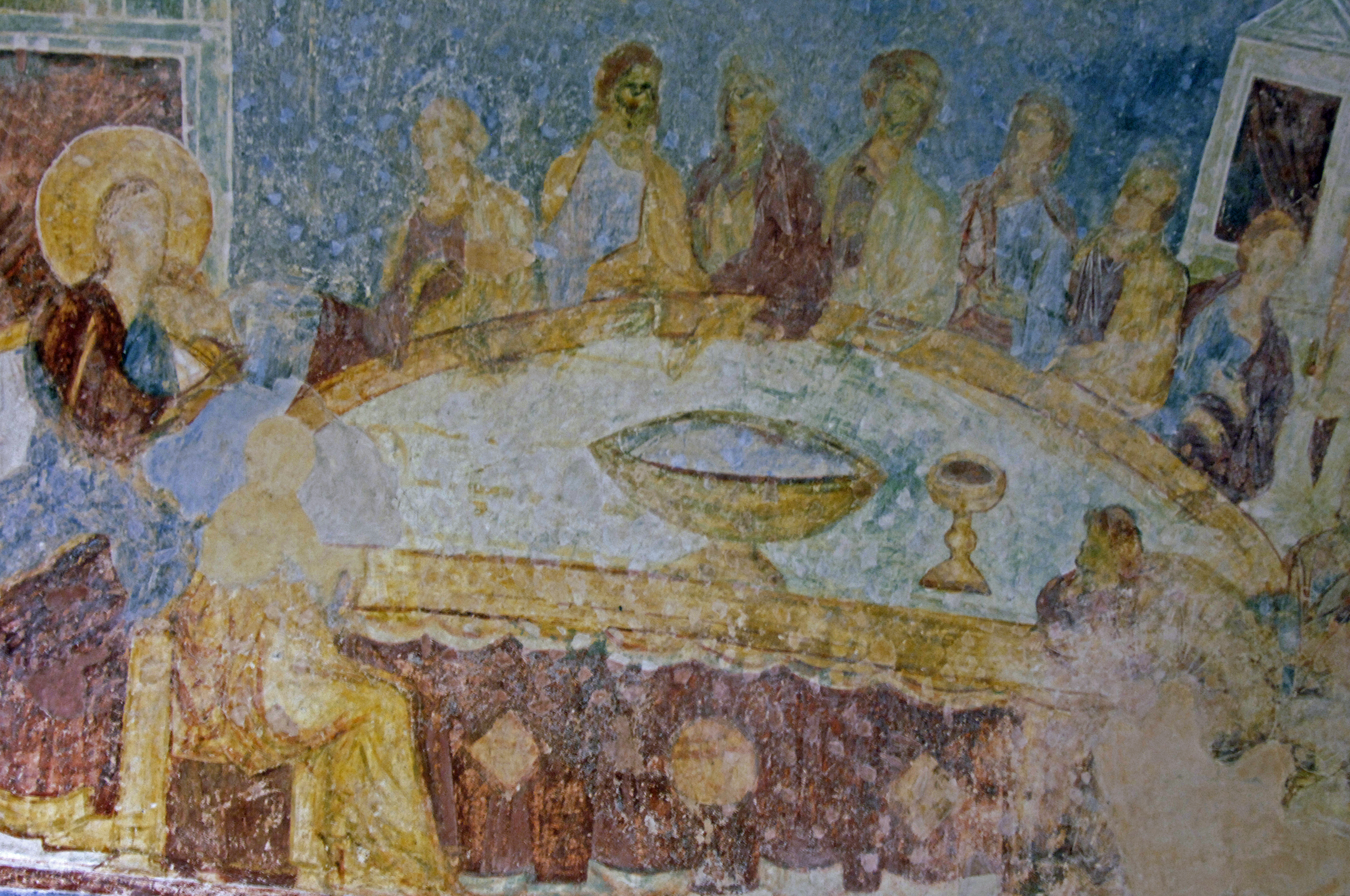
Last supper

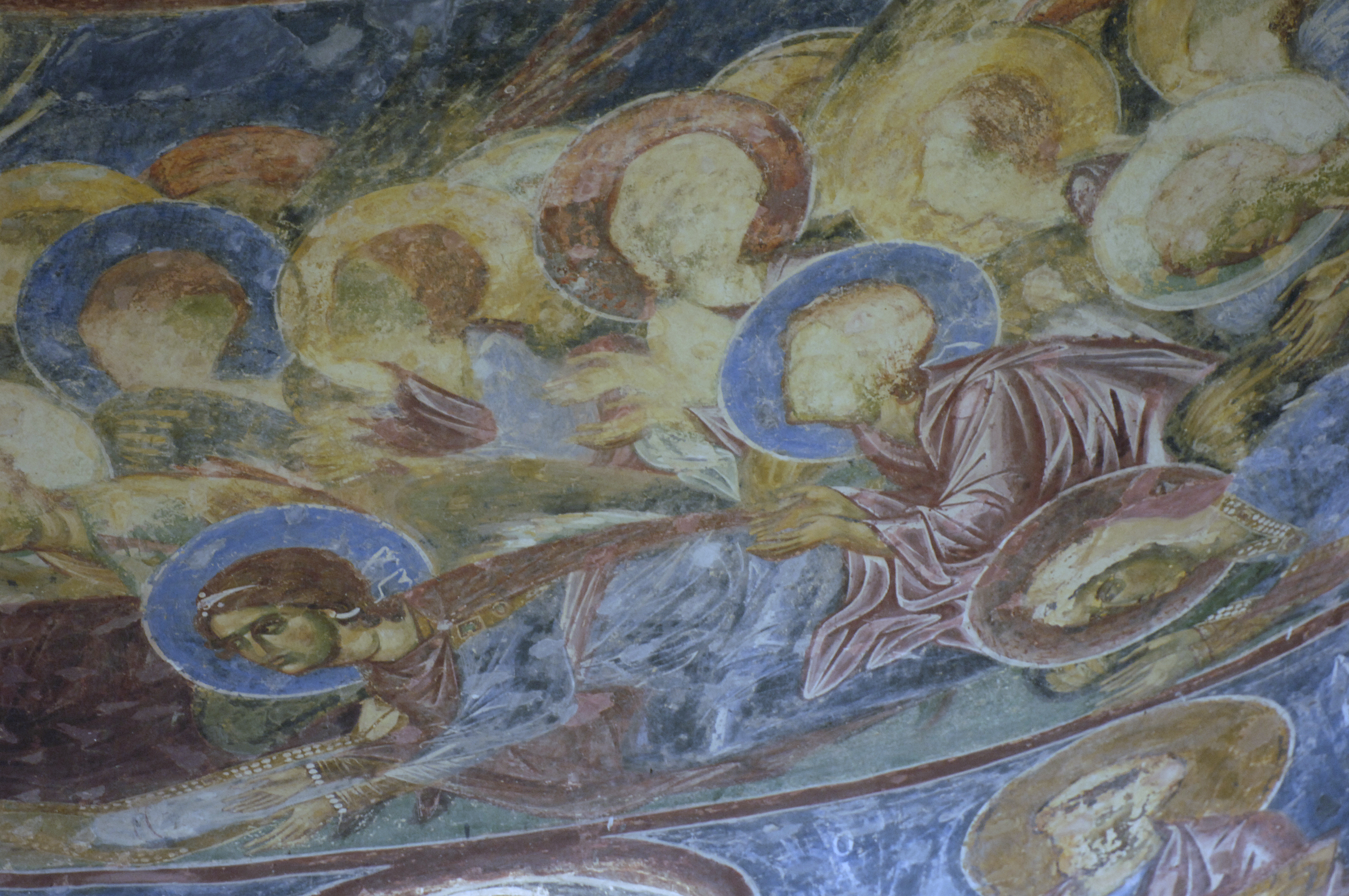
Unidentified scene

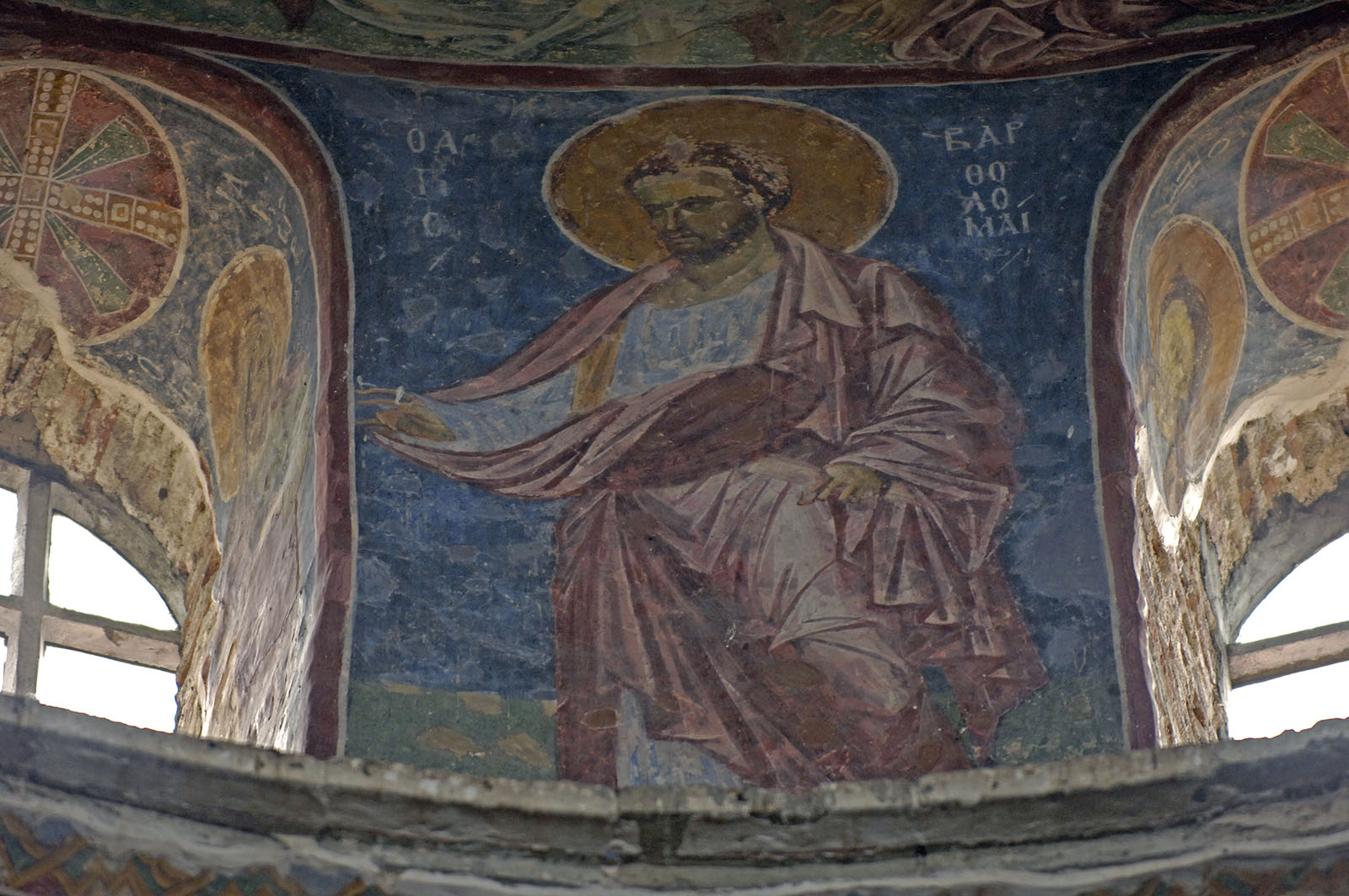
St. Bartholomew

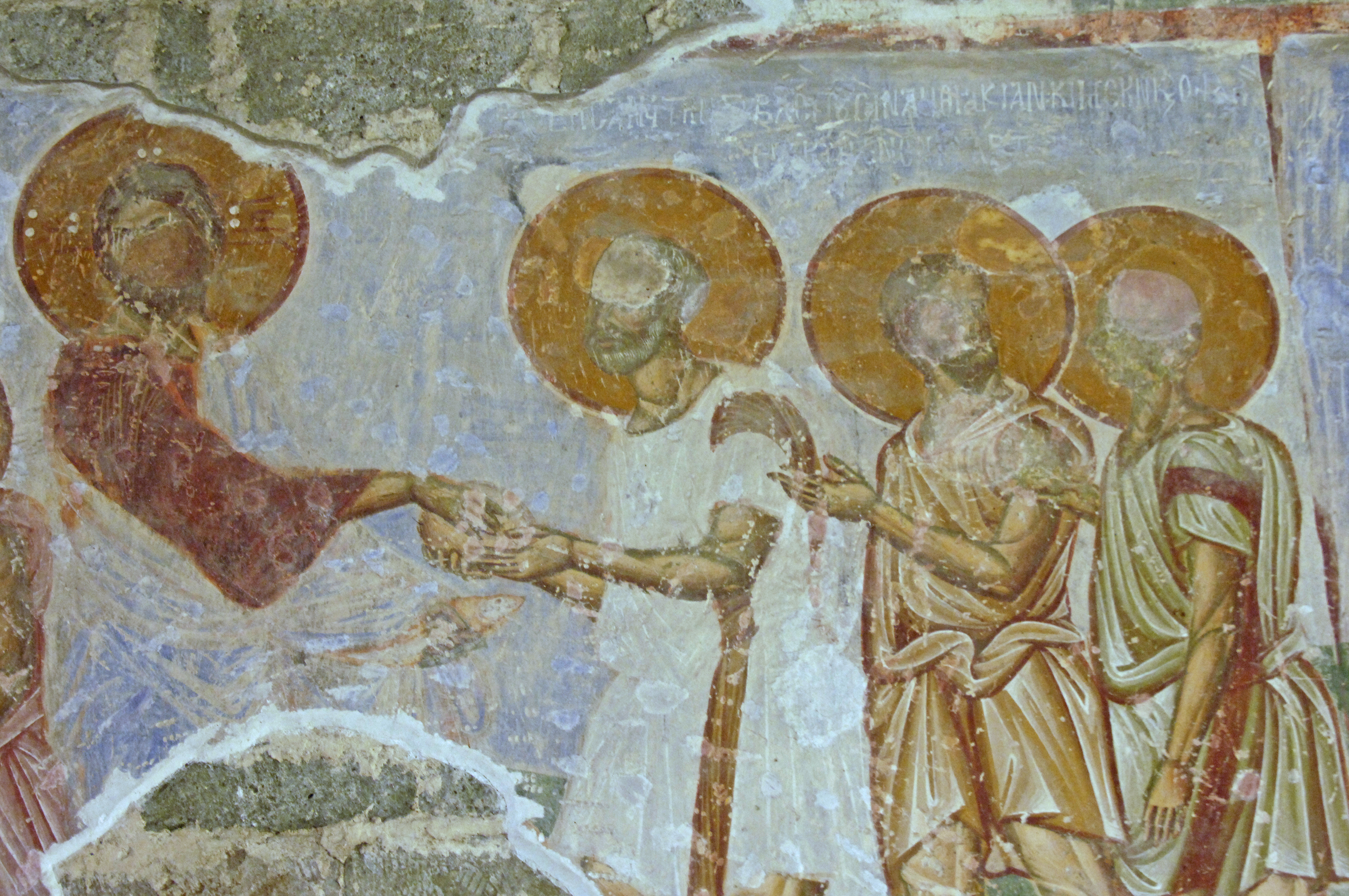
Unidentified scene

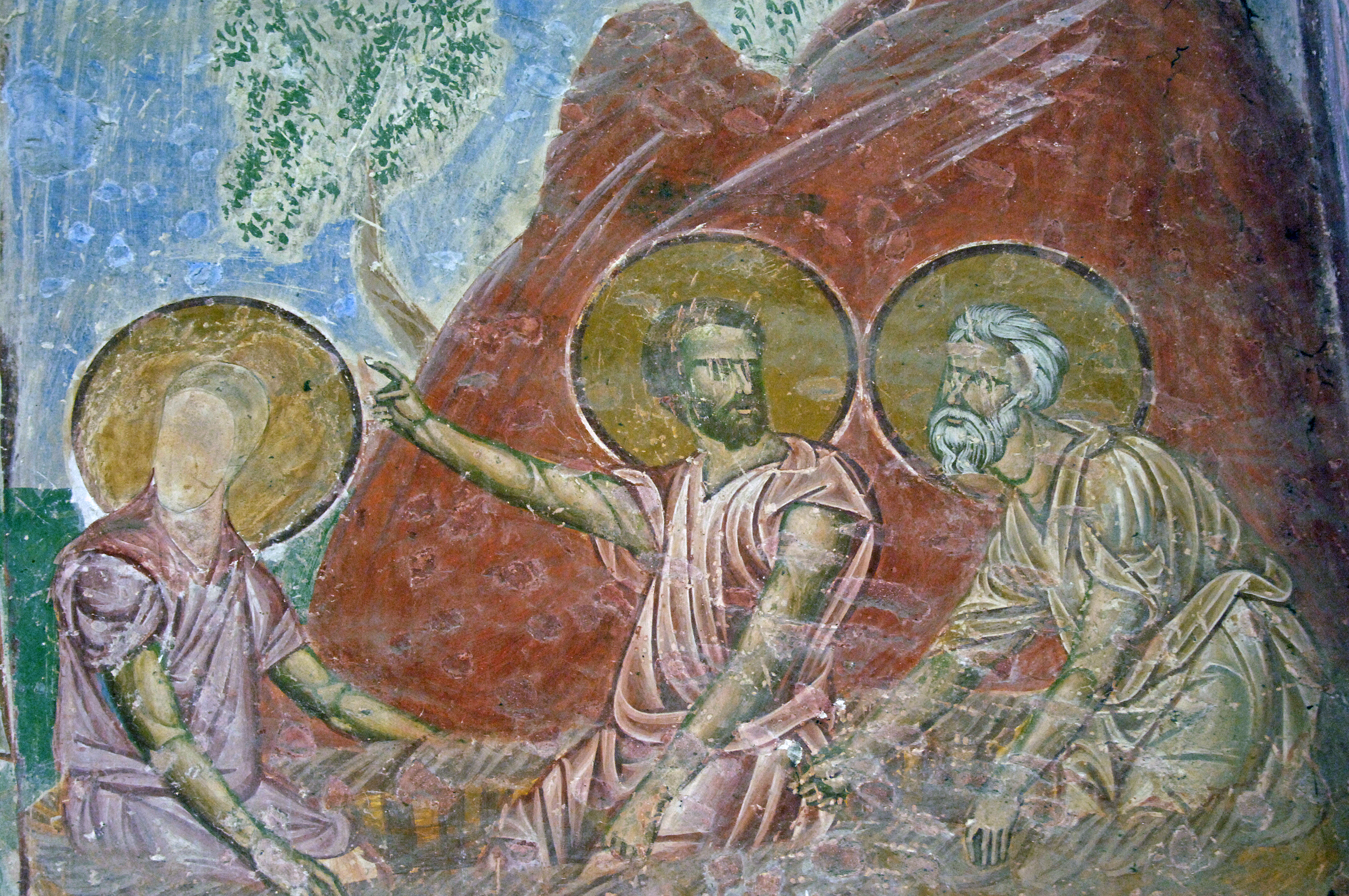
Unidentified scene

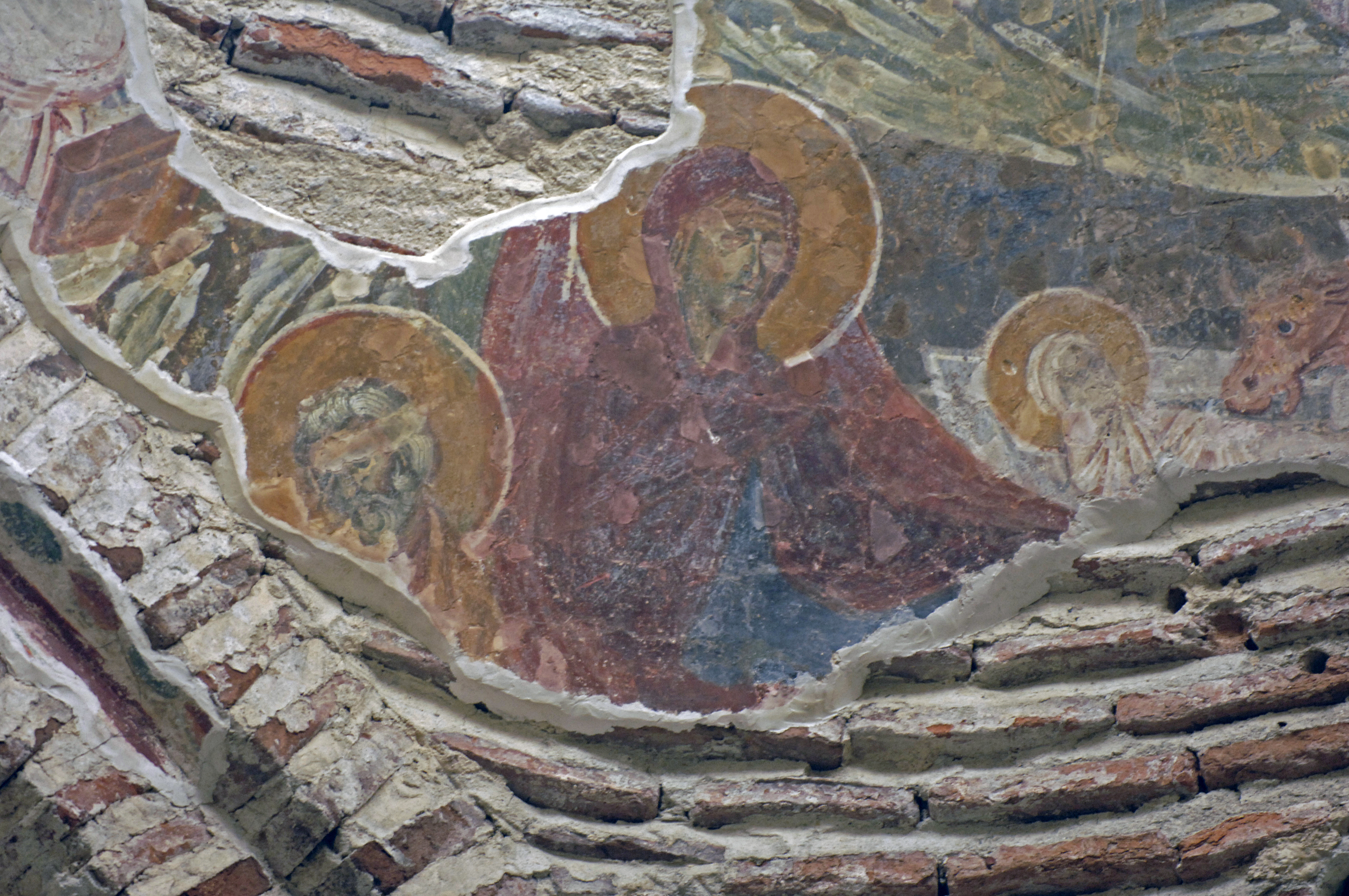
Unidentified scene

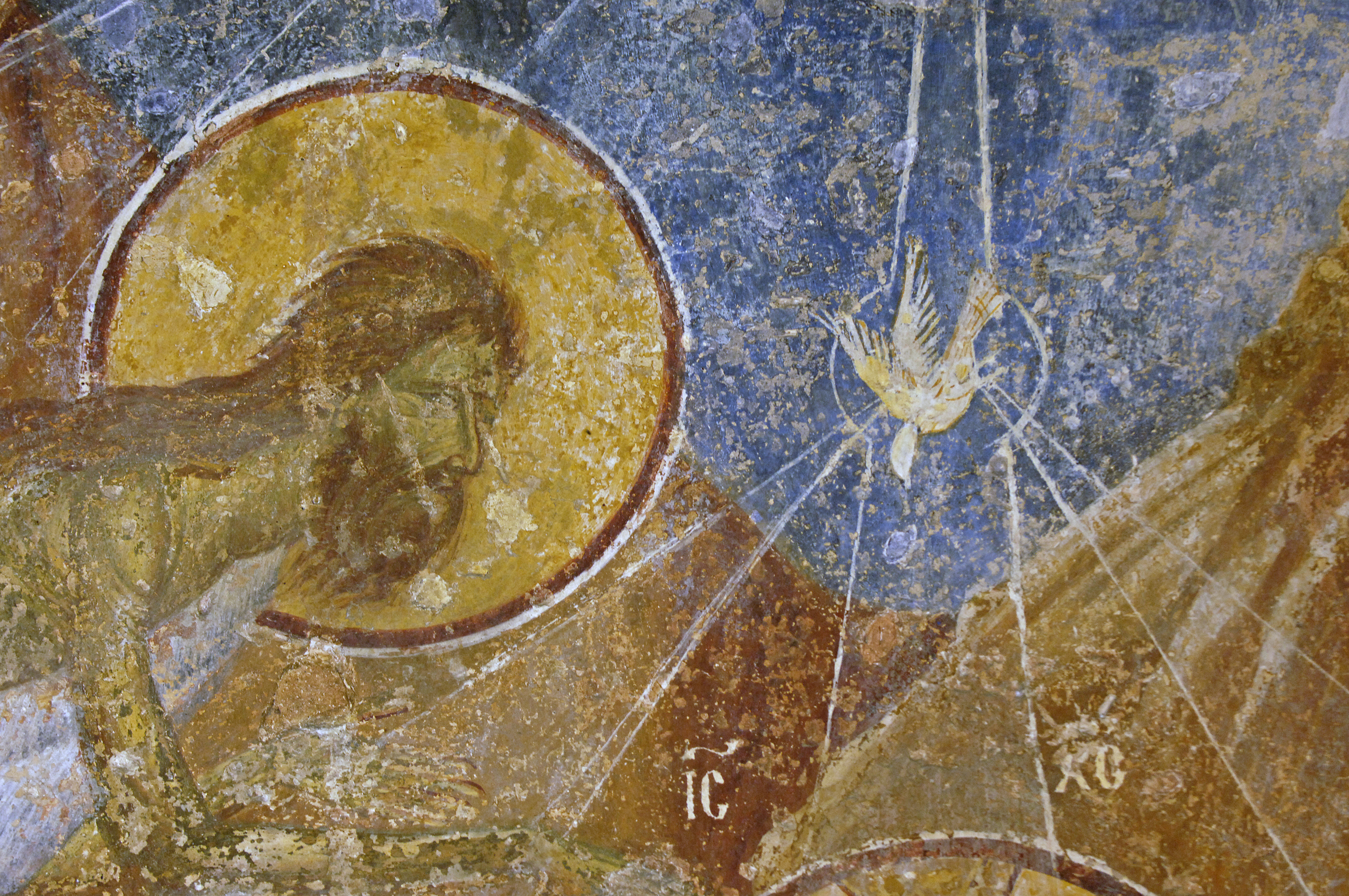
Baptism of Christ

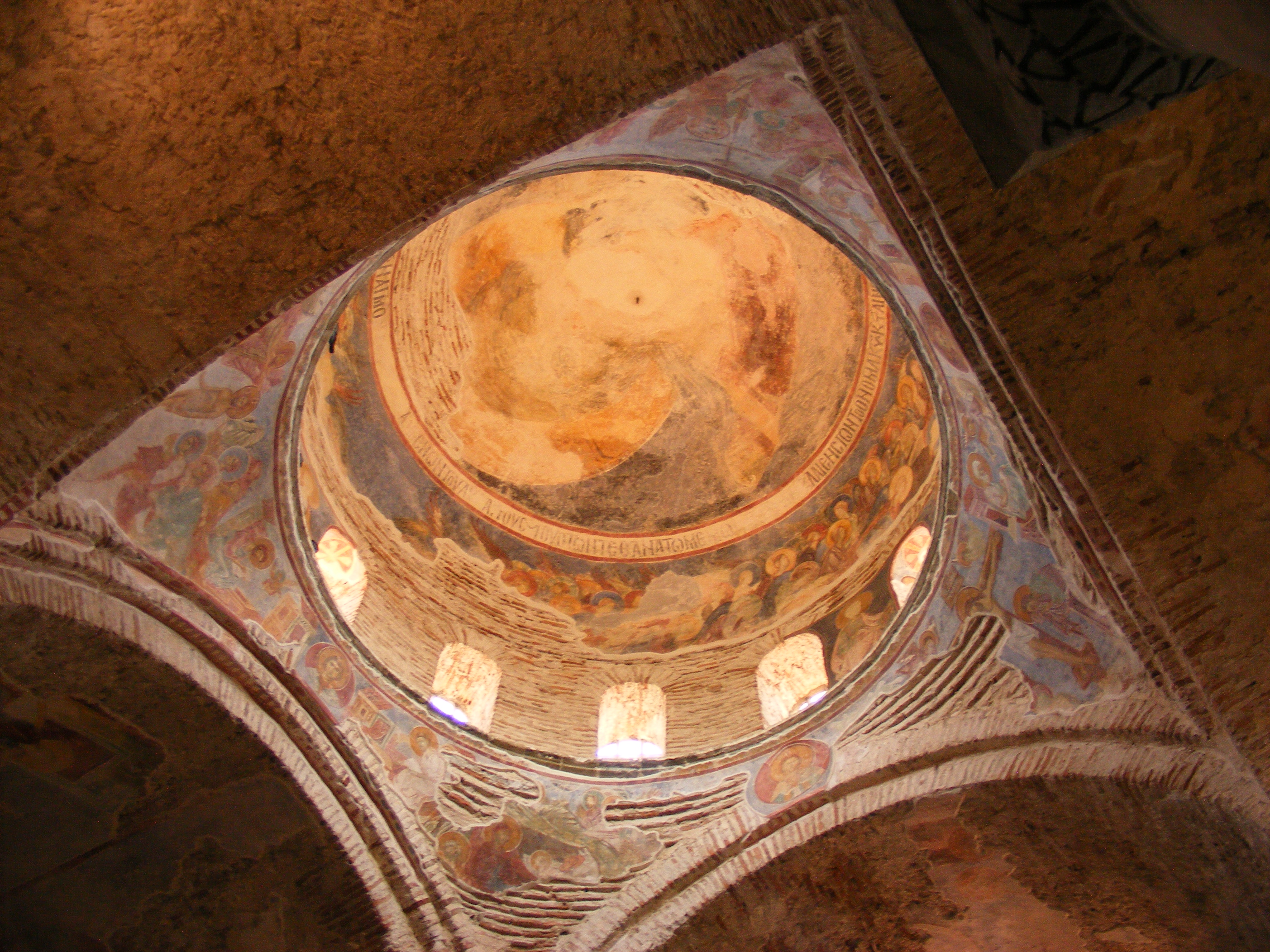
Dome frescoes

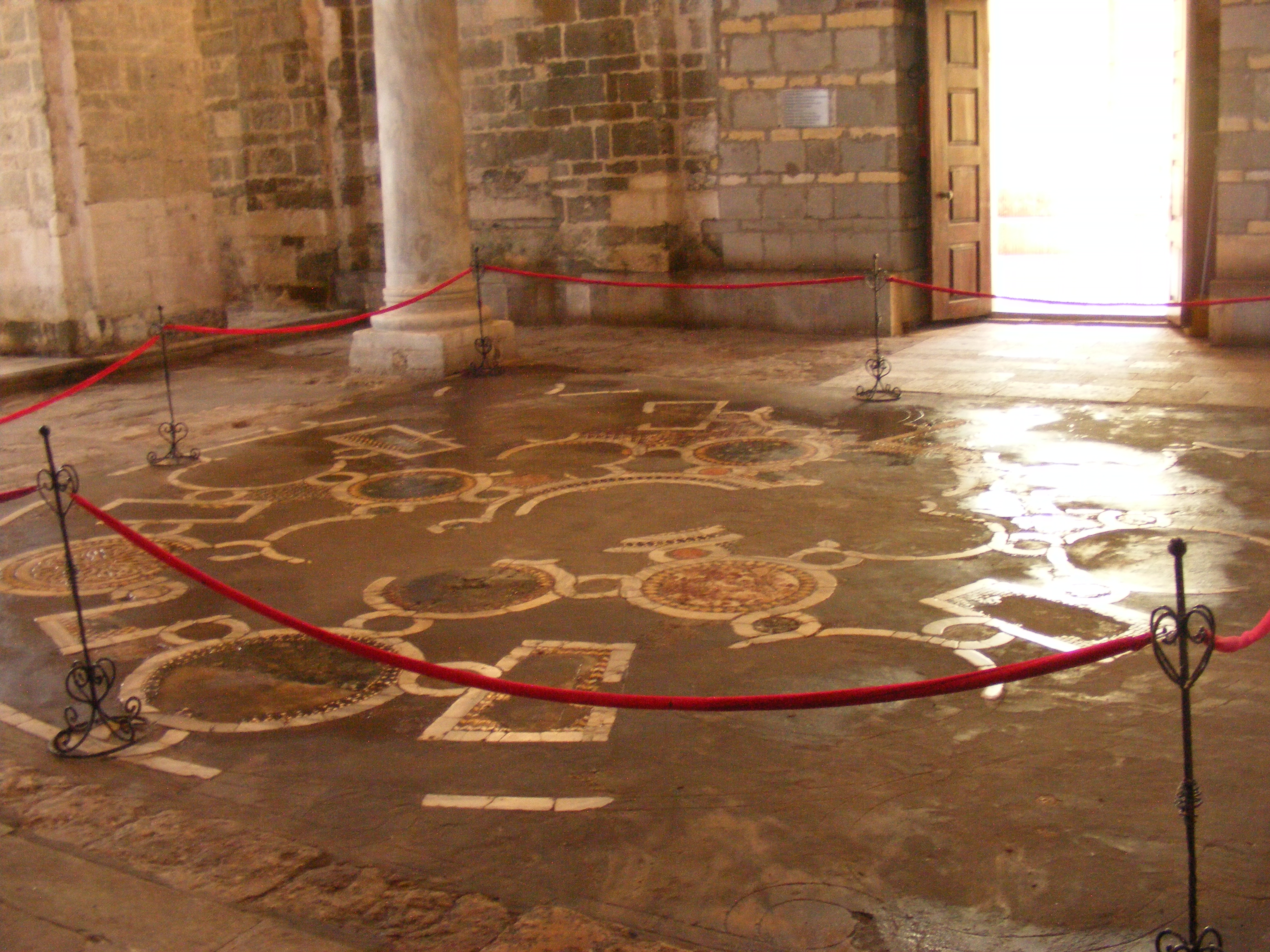
Floor in 2008

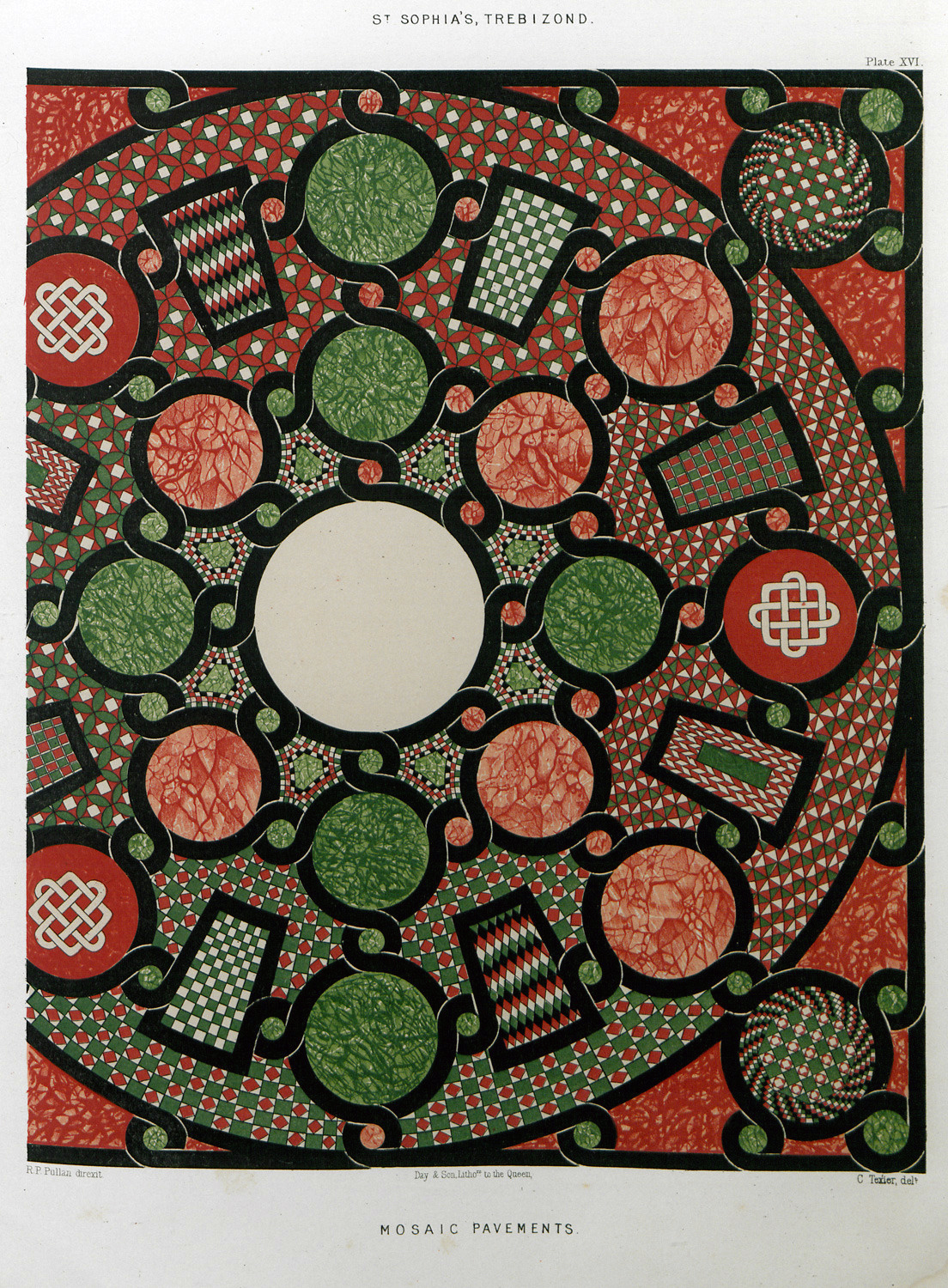
Reconstruction of the Opus Sectile floor tiling as drawn by Charles Texier in 1864. What remains was covered with a carpet in 2013.

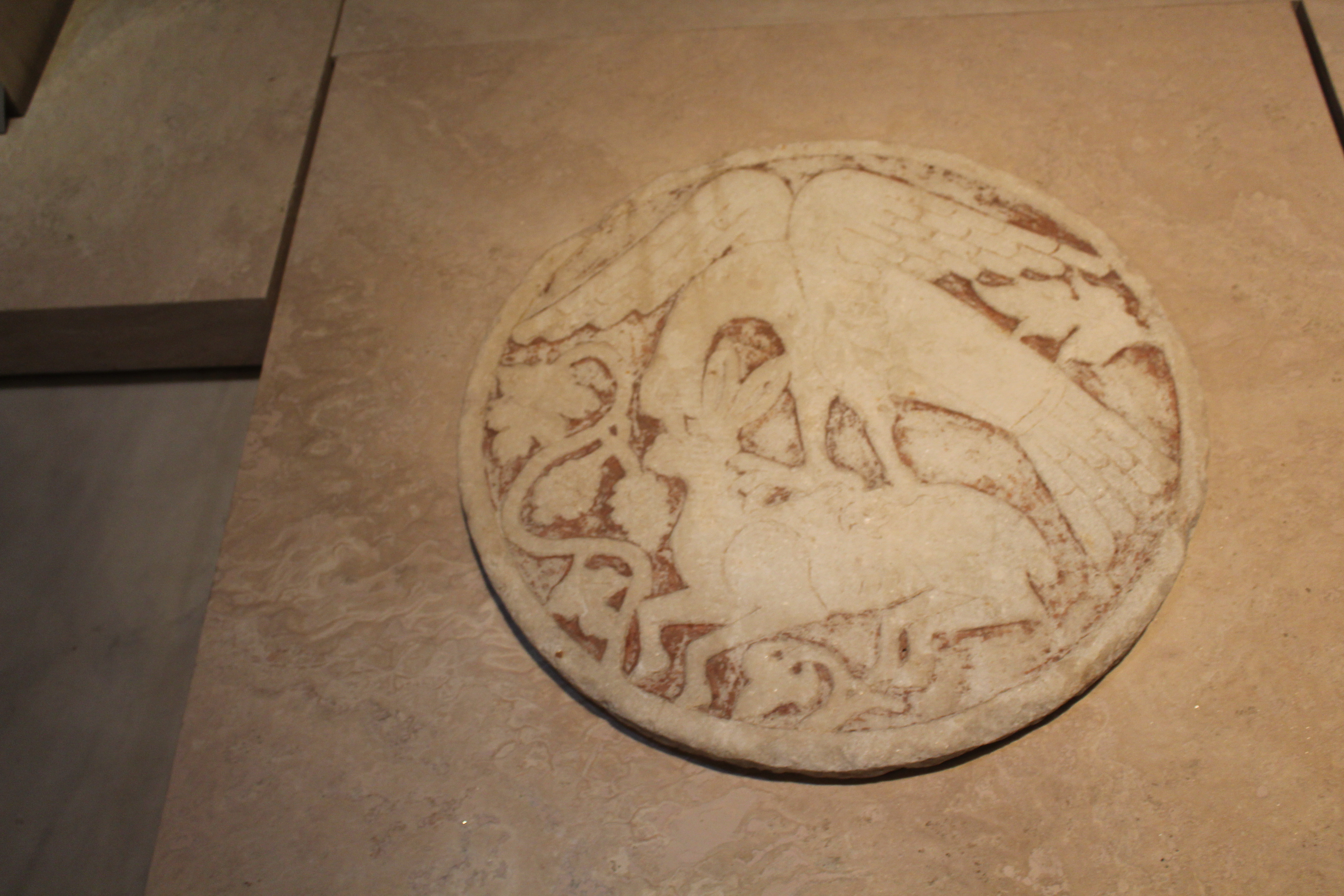
Omphalion from Hagia Sophia in Trebizond dating to the 13th century was brought to Thessaloniki in 1924. Now in the Museum of Byzantine Culture

== See also ==
- Ancient Roman and Byzantine domes
