= Nikos Kapetanidis =

Greek journalist and newspaper publisher

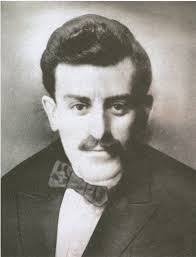
- Born: 1889; Rize, Ottoman Empire
- Died: 1921 (aged 31–32); Amasya, Ottoman Empire
- Occupations: Journalist, newspaper publisher
- Known for: His newspaper Epochi and his execution

Nikos Kapetanidis (Pontic: Νίκος Καπετανίδης, 1889–1921, aged 32) was a Pontian Greek journalist and newspaper publisher from Rizunda. He was hanged by Turkish nationalists serving under Mustafa Kemal during the Amasya trials.

== Life and career ==
Kapetanidis was born in Rize, a city in the Pontus region of the Ottoman Empire (modern Turkey). He attended the Phrontisterion of Trapezous, a Greek middle-level school in Trebizond. He began criticizing the education system while studying at the Phronsisterion of Trapezous. Kapetanidis was frustrated with the lack of skilled teachers. In his opinion, most contemporary teachers didn't encourage critical or creative thinking.

Many of Kapetanidis' opinions about education were influenced by his nationalist beliefs. During the late 1800s and early 1900s, Hellenic nationalism was on the rise. European Greeks were the main advocates of the Megali Idea ("Great Idea"), which encouraged the reformation of a Byzantine state in Greece and Anatolia. In order to foster Hellenic nationalism and pride outside of Europe, the Kingdom of Greece set up Greek consulates in the Ottoman Empire. It also sent Greek teachers to communities in Anatolia. This effort encouraged nationalism among some Anatolian Greeks, especially those in the educated upper classes.

For those Pontians who embraced ethnonationalism, their supposed European origin replaced their former self-identification as Ottoman Christians. Photiadis and Iliadou-Tachou argue that the rise of Turkish nationalism during the early 1900s fueled Greek nationalism and populism within the Ottoman Empire. Kapetanidis was one of the few Pontians who vocally supported these nationalist ideas.

Language was considered an important force to unite the European Greeks and the Eastern Greek populations. Unlike some of his contemporaries, Kapetanidis wanted vernacular Greek to be the teaching language of Pontian schools. In his mind, this would make knowledge more accessible to the average person.

After graduation, he became one of the most prominent journalists and active members of the local Greek press. Kapetanidis published his own newspaper, Epochi, literally "Seasons." It was published four times a week in Trebizond between 1918 and 1921. It was one of the most influential Greek newspapers in Trebizond. Other contemporary Pontic newspapers were Faros tis Anatolis in Trebizond and Eleftheros Pontos in Batumi.

He spoke on educational issues through his newspaper, supporting the use of vernacular Greek in the local schools. Moreover, he insisted that education shouldn't be controlled by the religious authorities, in particular the Ecumenical Patriarchate of Constantinople. Kapetanidis believed that teachers should train students as nationalist thinkers. In his mind, religious education was far less important than nationalist education. Kapetanidis also stated that teachers should receive high wages. At the time, many Pontic Greek teachers left the profession because of low pay. A year before his death, he wrote in Epochi, "For the sake of our dignity as Romans... (Note: The self-identification as Romans dates to the Byzantine Empire; Byzantines thought of themselves as successors to the Roman Empire.)you must not think that teaching us means begging."

== Death ==
Epochi, according to scholar Maria Vergeti, was the most important Greek-language newspaper in Trebizond. Kapetanidis was a prominent figure in the Trebizond Greek community. Some other influential Anatolian Greeks, such as Chrysanthos, the contemporary Metropolitan Bishop of Trebizond, encouraged Ottomanism: the peaceful coexistence between Turks and minorities. Unlike Chrysanthos, Kapetanidis used his position to advocate radical nationalist ideals, such as an independent Pontic state and the reunion of Pontos with Greece.

In 1921, the Turkish government conducted the Amasya trials. According to Vergeti, these trials "sentenced to death the spiritual and political leadership of the Pontic Greeks." Kapetanidis, a radical figure, was sentenced to death. However, so were men like Matthaios Kofidis, a politician popular among Muslims and Christians alike. Historian Tessa Hofmann termed these trials "the extermination of the Anatolian Greeks under a legal pretext."

Nikos Kapetanidis was hanged in September 1921 in Amasya during the Pontic Greek genocide. Turkish nationalists serving under Mustafa Kemal, later called Atatürk, executed him. He was among several notable Greeks killed as a result of the Amasya trials. His last words before he died were "Long live the land of the Hellenes."

== Legacy ==
A bust of Nikos Kapetanidis, sculpted by Gagik Altumian, stands in Marousi, Greece. A full-body statue of Kapetanidis, made by Giorgos Kikotis, was revealed in Stavroupoli, Thessaloniki, in September 2021, on the 100th anniversary of his death. A relief on the base depicts the execution of Pontian men in Amasya. The sculpture was vandalized the same month.

== See also ==
- Anton Pasha
