= Pontic Greeks =

Ethnic group

Έλληνες του Πόντου (Ρωμιοί) Karadeniz Rumları
- One of the Pontic flags

Total population
- c. 2,000,000 – 2,500,000

Regions with significant populations
- Greece: 368,000–500,000
- United States: 200,000
- Germany: 150,000
- Georgia: 100,000
- Ukraine: 75,000+
- Russia: 50,000+
- Kazakhstan: 10,000–12,000
- Uzbekistan: 10,000
- Armenia: 9,000
- Turkey: 5,000–5,100

Languages
- Predominantly Standard Modern Greek and Pontic Greek; Some also speak Turkish

Religion
- Greek Orthodox Christianity, Russian Orthodox Christianity, Sunni Islam (mostly in Turkey), other Christian denominations

Related ethnic groups
- Other Asia Minor Greeks, Caucasian Greeks, Urums, Mariupol Greeks, as well as others in the Caucasus

The Pontic Greeks (Pontic: Ρωμαίοι, Ρωμιοί; (Note: romanized: Romaioi, Romioi; Greek pronunciation: [roˈmei], [roˈmɲi]) Turkish: Pontus Rumları or Karadeniz Rumları; Greek: Πόντιοι, Ελληνοπόντιοι (Note: romanized: Pontioi, Ellinopontioi; Greek pronunciation: [ˈpondii], [elinoˈpondii]) (Note: Also in Georgian: პონტოელი ბერძნები, romanized: P'ont'oeli Berdznebi)), also Pontian Greeks or simply Pontians, are an ethnically Greek group indigenous to the region of Pontus, in northeastern Anatolia (modern-day Turkey). They share a common Pontic Greek culture that is distinguished by its music, dances, cuisine, and clothing. Folk dances, such as the Serra (also known as Pyrrhichios), and traditional musical instruments, like the Pontic lyra, remain important to Pontian diaspora communities. Pontians traditionally speak Pontic Greek, a modern Greek variety, that has developed remotely in the region of Pontus. Commonly known as Pontiaka, it is traditionally called Romeika by its native speakers.

The earliest Greek colonies in the region of Pontus begin in 700 BC, including Sinope, Trapezus, and Amisos. Greek colonies continued to expand on the coast of the Black Sea (Euxeinos Pontos) between the Archaic and Classical periods. The Hellenistic Kingdom of Pontus was annexed by Rome in 63 BC becoming Roman and later Byzantine territory. During the 11th century AD, Pontus was largely isolated from the rest of the Greek–speaking world, following the Seljuk conquest of Anatolia. After the 1203 siege of Constantinople by the Fourth Crusade, the Empire of Trebizond was established on the Black Sea coast by a branch of the Komnenos dynasty, later known as 'Grand Komnenos'. Anatolia, including Trebizond, was eventually conquered by the Ottomans entirely by the 15th century AD. Greek presence in Pontus remained vibrant during the early modern period up until the 20th century, when, following the Pontic Greek genocide and the 1923 population exchange with Turkey, Pontic Greeks migrated primarily to Greece and around the Caucasus, including in the country of Georgia. Although the vast majority of Pontic Greeks are Orthodox Christians, those who remained in Northeastern Turkey's Black Sea region following the population exchange are Muslim; their ancestors having converted to Islam during the Ottoman period, like thousands of other Greek Muslims.

Today, most Pontic Greeks live in Northern Greece, especially in and around Thessaloniki in Macedonia. Those from southern Russia, Ukraine, and Crimea are often referred to as "Northern Pontic [Greeks]", in contrast to those from "South Pontus", which strictly speaking is Pontus proper. Those from Georgia, northeastern Anatolia, and the former Russian Caucasus are in contemporary Greek academic circles often referred to as "Eastern Pontic [Greeks]" or Caucasian Greeks. The Turkic-speaking Greek Orthodox Urums are included in this latter groups as well. Aside from their predominantly Greek origin, they also likely owe a degree of their ancestry to several sources.

== Origins and genetics ==
Pontic Greeks are an ethnic Greek subgroup, indigenous to the region of Pontus, in northeastern Anatolia. Pontians are descendants of native Anatolians who were Hellenized during the Greek colonisation of the region. Greeks have lived in Pontus since "the time of the Argonauts, Herodotus and Xenophon and the Ten Thousand". They claim descent from ancient Greeks who in the 8th century BC had moved from the Ionian cities located in the islands and shores of the Aegean Sea, to the area of the Black Sea called Pontus. However, as many different ethnic groups have lived in the region since ancient times and have intermarried, present day Pontic Greeks also likely owe their ancestry to ancient Anatolians, other Greeks, other migrants to Pontus, and Caucasian peoples (such as Hellenized Lazs and Armenians).

Pontic Greeks are genetically similar to other groups living in the Caucasus. A genetic study of male Georgians, including Pontic Greeks in Georgia, revealed that the latter had high incidence of haplogroup L, which is also prevalent among Laz people. Haplogroup G2 and haplogroup J2 were also prevalent among the Pontians studied. Pontians in Georgia and Lazes are genetically similar. Armenians in Georgia and Pontians in Georgia are also genetically similar. In addition, the Pontians studied were genetically diverse, indicating genetic mixture with other groups. The region of Pontus has been diverse since at least the Middle Ages; in 1204, the Matzouka (Maçka) region alone contained Greeks, Italians, Lazes and a few Armenians.

== Self-identification ==
In the 21st century, most Pontians strongly identify as Greeks. However, this has not always been the case. Before the creation of the diaspora, many Pontians did not consider themselves Greek.

An ethnicity is made up of people with ancestry or cultural background in common. Self-identification is an important part of belonging to an ethnic group. Pontians have a lot in common with other Greeks; for example, they speak Romeika, a Greek language variety. Pontians also traditionally follow the Greek Orthodox faith, although a minority in Turkey are Sunni Muslims. Pontian Greeks also share traits with other ethnic groups. Like Turks, they cook havítz (kuymak), boortsog, and İmam bayıldı. They share other aspects of their culture with Lazes, Persians, and Armenians. They may owe some aspects of their culture to ancient Anatolian peoples.

The Pontic label is relatively new. Anton Popov writes, "Anthony Bryer states that 'at the beginning of the nineteenth century a Pontic Christian might describe himself in the old way as a Douberites, Phytanos or Tsitenos first, and then as a "Roman" (Rum) Orthodox subject of the sultan; by the end of the century he was calling himself a Greek, and after he had finally left the Pontos in 1923, a Pontic Greek.'" Anton Popov studied Caucasus Greeks in former Soviet territories. Most of the Romeika speakers that Popov interviewed referred to themselves as "Romei." He also mentioned that many Caucasus Greeks only began referring to themselves as Pontians when they went to work in Greece.

During Ottoman times, most Pontian Greeks did not see themselves as "Greeks" per se. Neal Acherson, in his book Black Sea, writes, "Who did they think they were, in this pre-nationalist age? In the first place, they did not think of themselves as 'Greek' or as a people in some way rooted in the peninsula and islands we now call 'Greece.' Sophisticates in Trebizond might address one another in the fifteenth century as 'Hellenes,' but this was a cultural fancy rather than an ethnic description. Outsiders, whether Turks or northern Europeans, referred to them and to all the inhabitants of the Byzantine Empire as 'Rom' or 'Rum' people, or as 'Romanians' [Romans] — citizens of the Roman Empire, in other words, who were also distinguished by their Orthodox Christian faith. Struggling with these categories, a Pontic Turk whose village had once been Greek told Anthony Bryer: 'This is Roman (Rum) country; they spoke Christian here ...'" This identification mirrored the identification of other non-intellectual Greeks at the time.

Greek nationalism only began to spread to the Pontos in the 1800s after the Greek nation gained independence from the Ottoman Empire. This nationalism came during a time of commercial prosperity in the Pontos. Again, Acherson writes, "The teachers and the school curricula came from Athens, bringing with them a new concept of Greekness which linked the Greek-Orthodox communities of the Black Sea and the 'nation' of Greece." He goes on to explain how the Greek government encouraged nationalist thinking: "A speaker in the Greek parliament in 1844 expounded this newly designed identity: 'The Kingdom of Greece is not Greece. It constitutes only one part, the smallest and the poorest. A Greek is not only a man who lives within the Kingdom, but also one who lives in Yoannina, Serrai, Adrianople, Constantinople, Smyrna, Trebizond, Crete and in any land associated with Greek history and the Greek race." The newly established Kingdom of Greece set up consulates in the Ottoman Empire to spread the Megali Idea. While the Anatolians recognized a shared cultural heritage, most weren't involved in an irredentist movement.

Few Pontic Greeks supported the Megali Idea except for some Greek nationalists such as Nikos Kapetanidis. Very few wanted an independent Pontic state, and few had ambition to join with Greece, even in the early 1900s. The reason for this is unclear. Benny Morris and Dror Ze'evi give three theories on why most Pontic Greeks distanced themselves from nationalism and separatism: poorly developed political consciousness, tradition of submissiveness to Islamic hegemony, or fears of massacres and economic harm. More generally, Greek nationalism in Asia Minor mostly appealed to "the most enlightened and liberal", to the medical, legal and literary professionals and to the rising middle class. It was opposed, however, by the "ancient [Greek] nobility, the superior clergy, the lay dignitaries of the church and the wealthy merchants". Currently, there are some Turkish-speaking Pontic-identifying communities, living in the Greek region of Western Macedonia, specifically in Metamorfosi, Kozani. These Pontians follow the Greek Orthodox Church and profess a strong Greek identity. After the Greek–Turkish population exchange in 1923, even though the state never considered them a "national threat", some of these Pontians saw their language as a "cultural flaw" and desired to get rid of it. Historian and psychologist Stavros Iason Gavriilidis argues that this was a result of the trauma they faced from the Greek genocide.

== Mythology ==
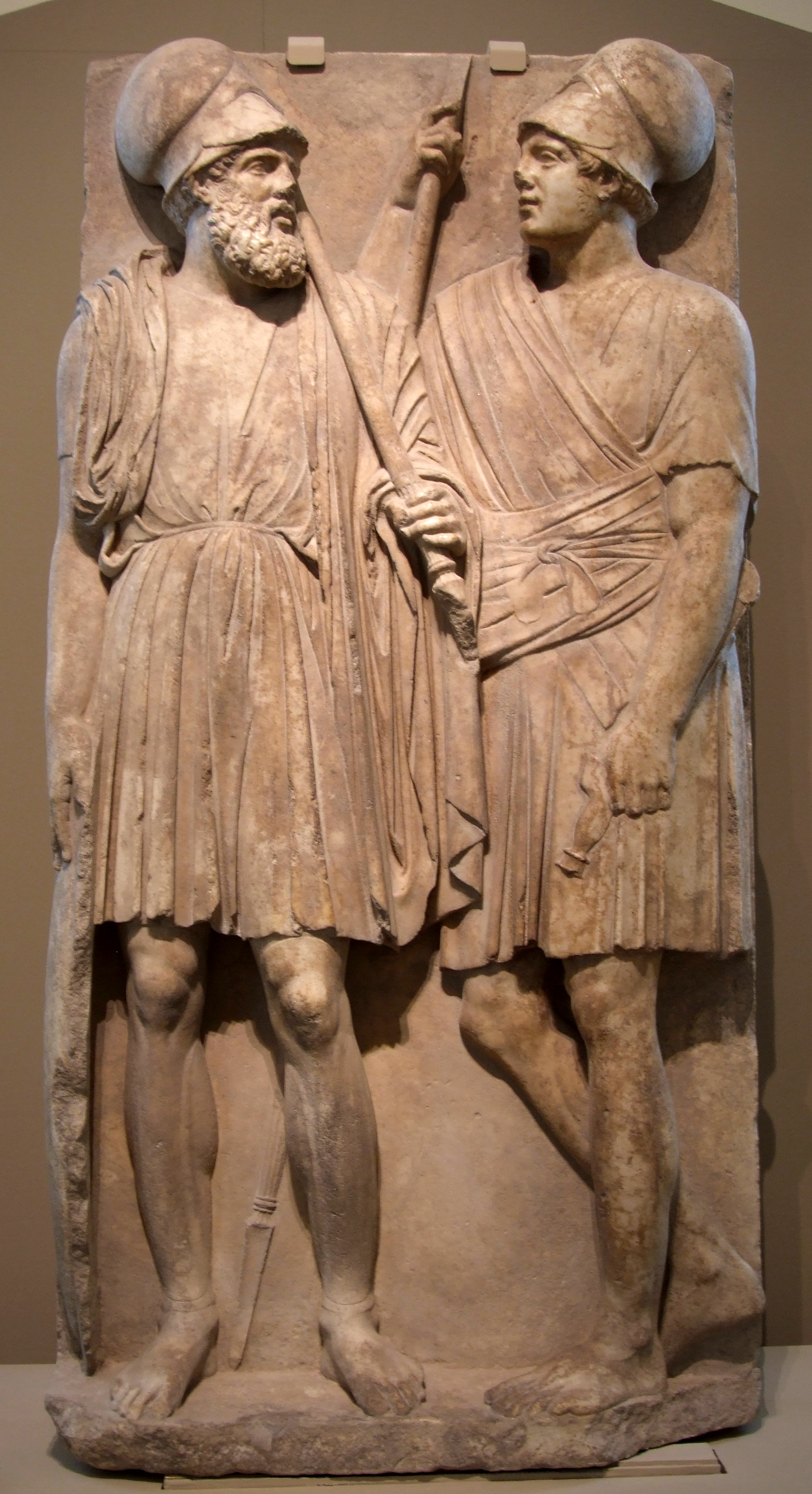
Funerary stele of two Greek warriors found on the Black Sea coast, Taman peninsula, 4th century BC

In Greek mythology the Black Sea region is the region where Jason and the Argonauts sailed to find the Golden Fleece. The Amazons, female warriors in Greek Mythology lived in Pontus, and a minority lived in Taurica, also known as Crimea, which is also the minor unique settlement of Pontic Greeks. The warlike characteristics of Pontic Greeks were once said to have been derived from the Amazons of Pontus.

== History ==
=== Antiquity ===
Greek colonies of the Euxine Sea, 8th to 3rd century BC

The first recorded Greek colony, established on the northern shores of ancient Anatolia, was Sinope on the Black Sea, circa 800 BC. The settlers of Sinope were merchants from the Ionian Greek city state of Miletus. After the colonization of the shores of the Black Sea, known until then to the Greek world as Pontos Axeinos (Inhospitable Sea), the name changed to Pontos Euxeinos (Hospitable Sea). In time, as the numbers of Greeks settling in the region grew significantly, more colonies were established along the whole Black Sea coastline of what is now Turkey, Bulgaria, Georgia, Russia, Ukraine, and Romania.

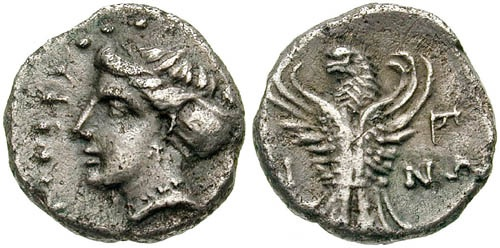
Ancient Greek coin from Sinope, coast depicting the head of a nymph and an eagle with raised wings, 4th century BC

The region of Trapezus (later called Trebizond, now Trabzon) was mentioned by Xenophon in his famous work Anabasis, describing how he and other 10,000 Greek mercenaries fought their way to the Euxine Sea after the failure of the rebellion of Cyrus the Younger whom they fought for, against his older brother Artaxerxes II of Persia. Xenophon mentions that when at the sight of sea they shouted "Thalatta! Thalatta!" – "The sea! The sea!", the local people understood them. They were Greeks too and, according to Xenophon, they had been there for over 300 years. A whole range of trade flourished among the various Greek colonies, but also with the indigenous tribes who inhabited the Pontus inland. Soon Trebizond established a leading stature among the other colonies and the region nearby become the heart of the Pontian Greek culture and civilization. A notable inhabitant of the region was Philetaerus (c. 343 BC–263 BC) who was born to a Greek father in the small town of Tieion which was situated on the Black Sea coast of the Pontus Euxinus, he founded the Attalid dynasty and the Anatolian city of Pergamon in the second century BC.

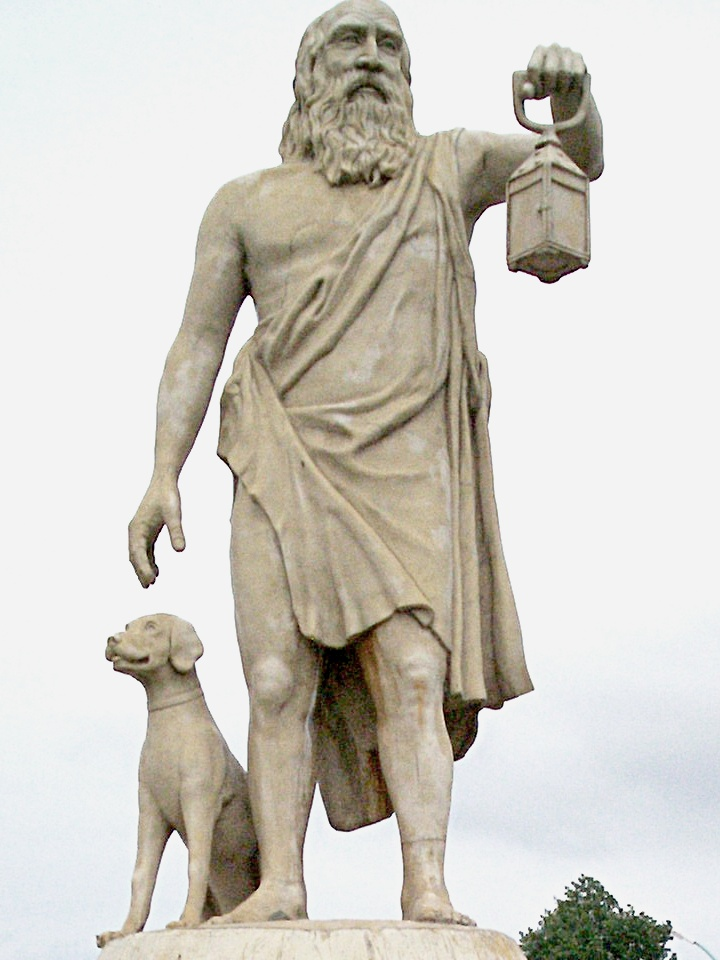
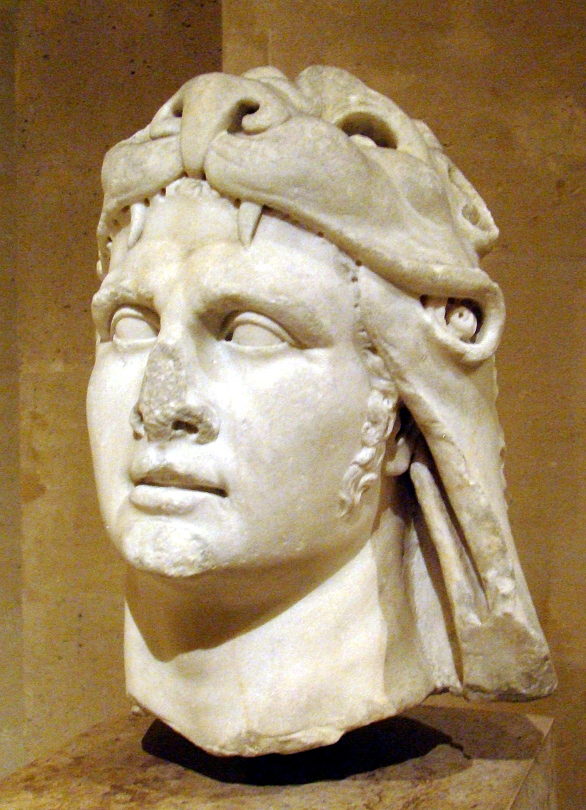
Diogenes of Sinope (c. 408–323 BC) and Mithridates VI Eupator, King of Pontus (135–63 BC)

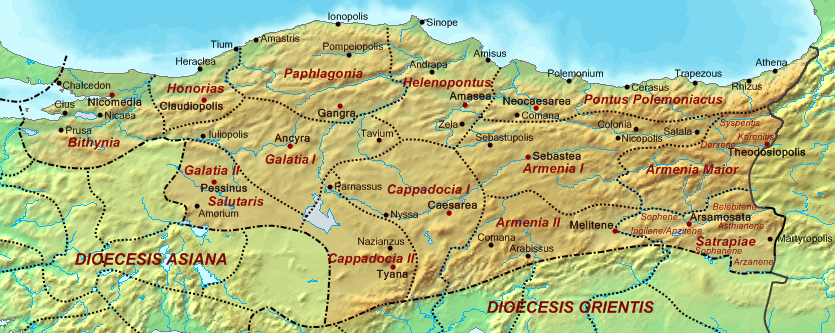
Roman Diocese of Pontus, 400 AD

This region was organized circa 281 BC as a kingdom by Mithridates I of Pontus, whose ancestry line dated back to Ariobarzanes I, a Persian ruler of the Greek town of Cius. The most prominent descendant of Mithridates I was Mithridates VI Eupator, who between 90 and 65 BC fought the Mithridatic Wars, three bitter wars against the Roman Republic, before eventually being defeated. Mithridates VI the Great, as he was left in memory, claiming to be the protector of the Greek world against the barbarian Romans, expanded his kingdom to Bithynia, Crimea and Propontis (in present-day Ukraine and Turkey) before his downfall after the Third Mithridatic War.

Nevertheless, the kingdom survived as a Roman vassal state, now named Bosporan Kingdom and based in Crimea, until the 4th century AD, when it succumbed to the Huns. The rest of the Pontus became part of the Roman Empire, while the mountainous interior (Chaldia) was fully incorporated into the Eastern Roman Empire during the 6th century.

=== Middle Ages ===
Pontus was the birthplace of the Komnenos dynasty, which ruled the Byzantine Empire from 1082 to 1185, a time in which the empire resurged to recover much of Anatolia from the Seljuk Turks. In the aftermath of the fall of Constantinople to the Crusaders of the Fourth Crusade in 1204, the Empire of Trebizond was established by Alexios I of Trebizond, a descendant of Alexios I Komnenos, the patriarch of the Komnenos dynasty. The Empire was ruled by this new branch of the Komenos dynasty which bore the name Megas Komnenos Axouch (or Axouchos or Afouxechos) as early rulers intermarried with the family of Axouch, a Byzantine noble house of Turkic origin which included famed politicians such as John Axouch

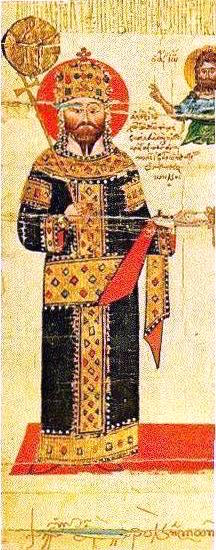
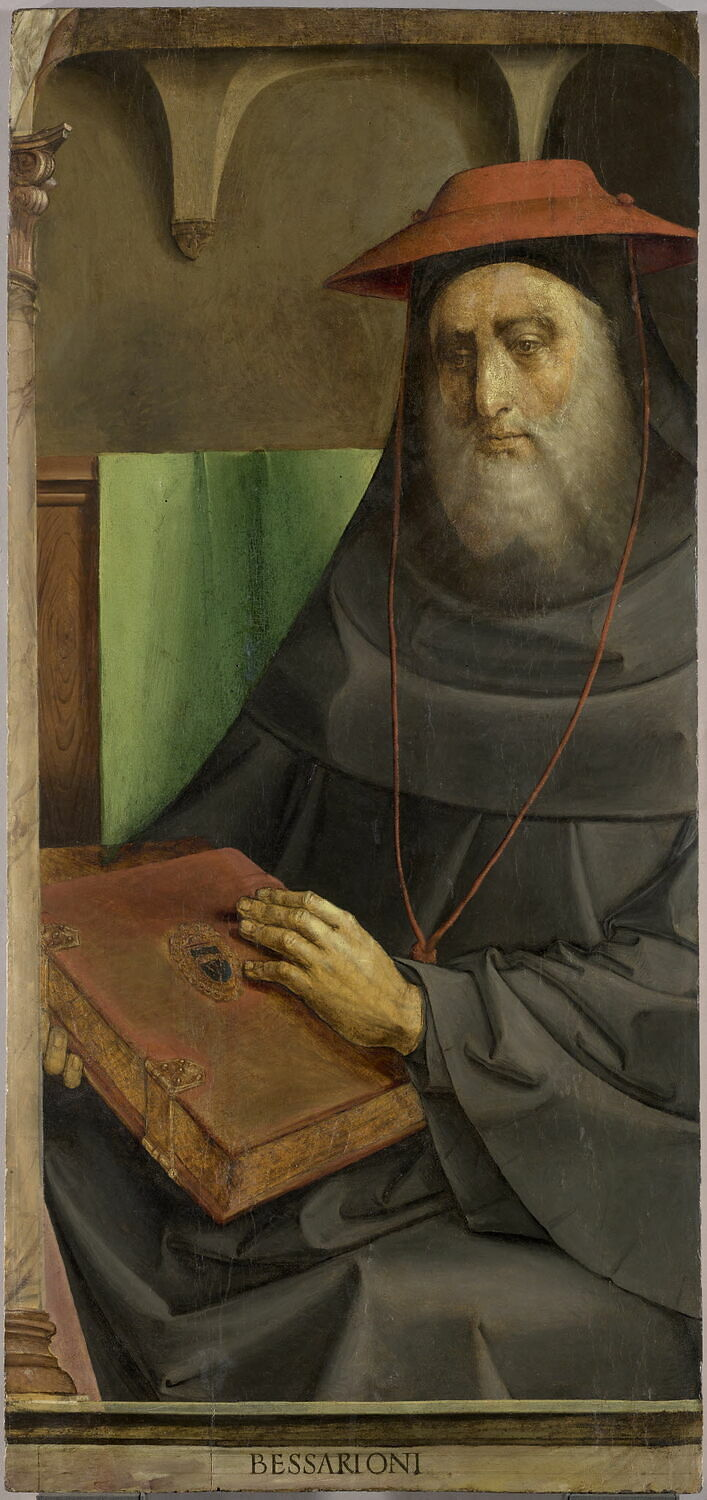
Alexios III (1338–1390), Emperor of Trebizond and Cardinal Bessarion of Trebizond (1395–1472), a Pontian Greek scholar, statesman and cardinal.

This empire lasted for more than 250 years until it eventually fell at the hands of Mehmed II of the Ottoman Empire in 1461. However it took the Ottomans 18 more years to finally defeat the Greek resistance in Pontus. During this long period of resistance many Pontic Greeks nobles and aristocrats married foreign emperors and dynasties, most notably of Medieval Russia, Medieval Georgia, or the Safavid Persian dynasty, and to a lesser extent the Kara Koyunlu rulers, in order to gain their protection and aid against the Ottoman threat. Many of the landowning and lower-class families of Pontus "turned-Turk", adopting the Turkish language and Turkish Islam but often remaining crypto-Christian before reverting to their Greek Orthodoxy in the early 19th century. The long period of Ottoman rule up until the population exchange was called the Tourkokratia.

In the 1600s and 1700s, as Turkish lords called derebeys gained more control of land along the Black Sea coast, many coastal Pontians moved to the Pontic Mountains. There, they established villages such as Santa.

Between 1461 and the second Russo-Turkish War of 1828–29, Pontic Greeks from northeastern Anatolia migrated as refugees or economic migrants (especially miners and livestock breeders) into nearby Armenia or Georgia, where they came to form a nucleus of Pontic Greeks which increased in size with the addition of each wave of refugees and migrants until these eastern Pontic Greek communities of the South Caucasus region came to define themselves as Caucasian Greeks.

During the Ottoman period a number of Pontian Greeks converted to Islam and adopted the Turkish language. This could be willingly, for example so to avoid paying the higher rate of taxation imposed on Orthodox Christians or in order to make themselves more eligible for higher level government and regular military employment opportunities within the empire (at least in the later period following the abolition of the infamous Greek and Balkan Christian child levy or 'devshirme', on which the elite Janissary corps had in the early Ottoman period depended for its recruits). But conversion could also occur in response to pressures from central government and local Muslim militia (e.g.) following any one of the Russo-Turkish wars in which ethnic Greeks from the Ottoman Empire's northern border regions were known to have collaborated, fought alongside, and sometimes even led invading Russian forces, such as was the case in the Greek governed, semi-autonomous Romanian Principalities, Trebizond, and the area that was briefly to become part of the Russian Caucasus in the far northeast.

=== Modern ===
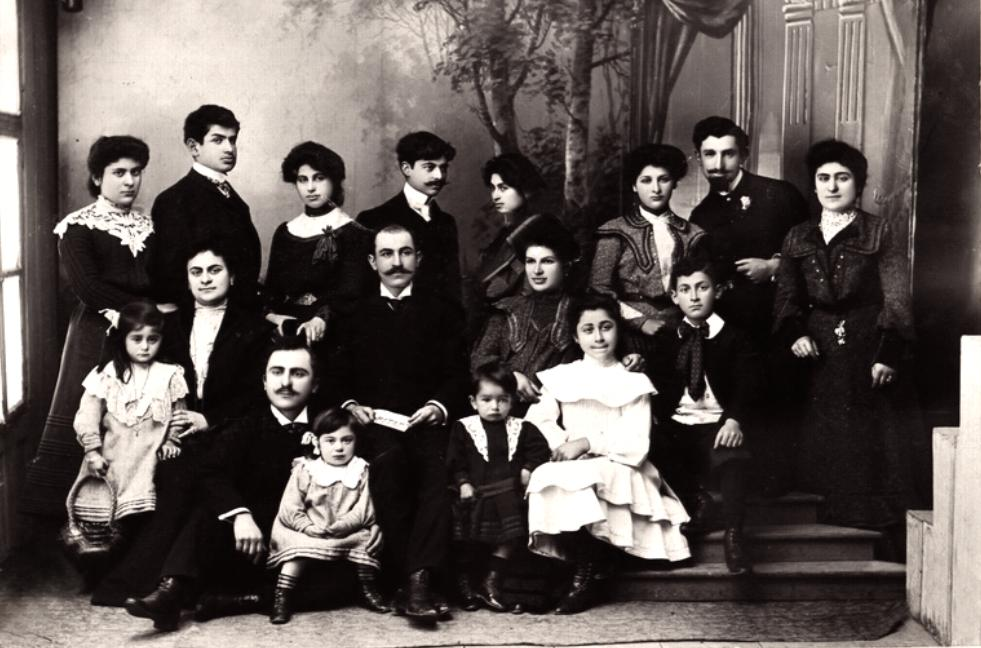
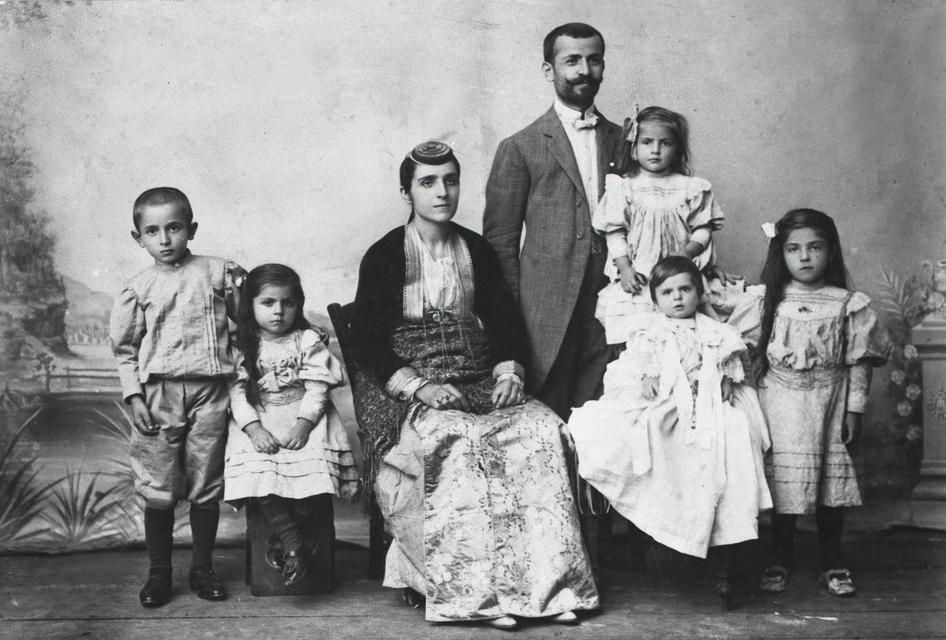
Pontic Greek families of the early 20th century

Large communities (around 25% of the population) of Christian Pontic Greeks remained throughout the Pontus area (including Trabzon and Kars in northeastern Turkey/the Russian Caucasus) until the 1920s, and in parts of Georgia and Armenia until the 1990s, preserving their own customs and dialect of Greek.

==== Muslim Pontians in Turkey ====
In Turkey's Eastern Black Sea region, there are previously Islamized Greek settlements in the inner regions of Trabzon, the coastal area from Yomra to Of, the city center of Gümüşhane, the districts of Torul and Şiran, the western districts of Rize, northern Bayburt, and the inner regions of Artvin. Muslim Pontic people who migrated from the Eastern Black Sea region also live in Kocaeli, Sakarya, Düzce, Bursa, Zonguldak, Erzincan, northern Erzurum, and Ardahan. Today, there are between 550,000 and 685,000 Pontic Muslims.

== Genocide and population exchange ==
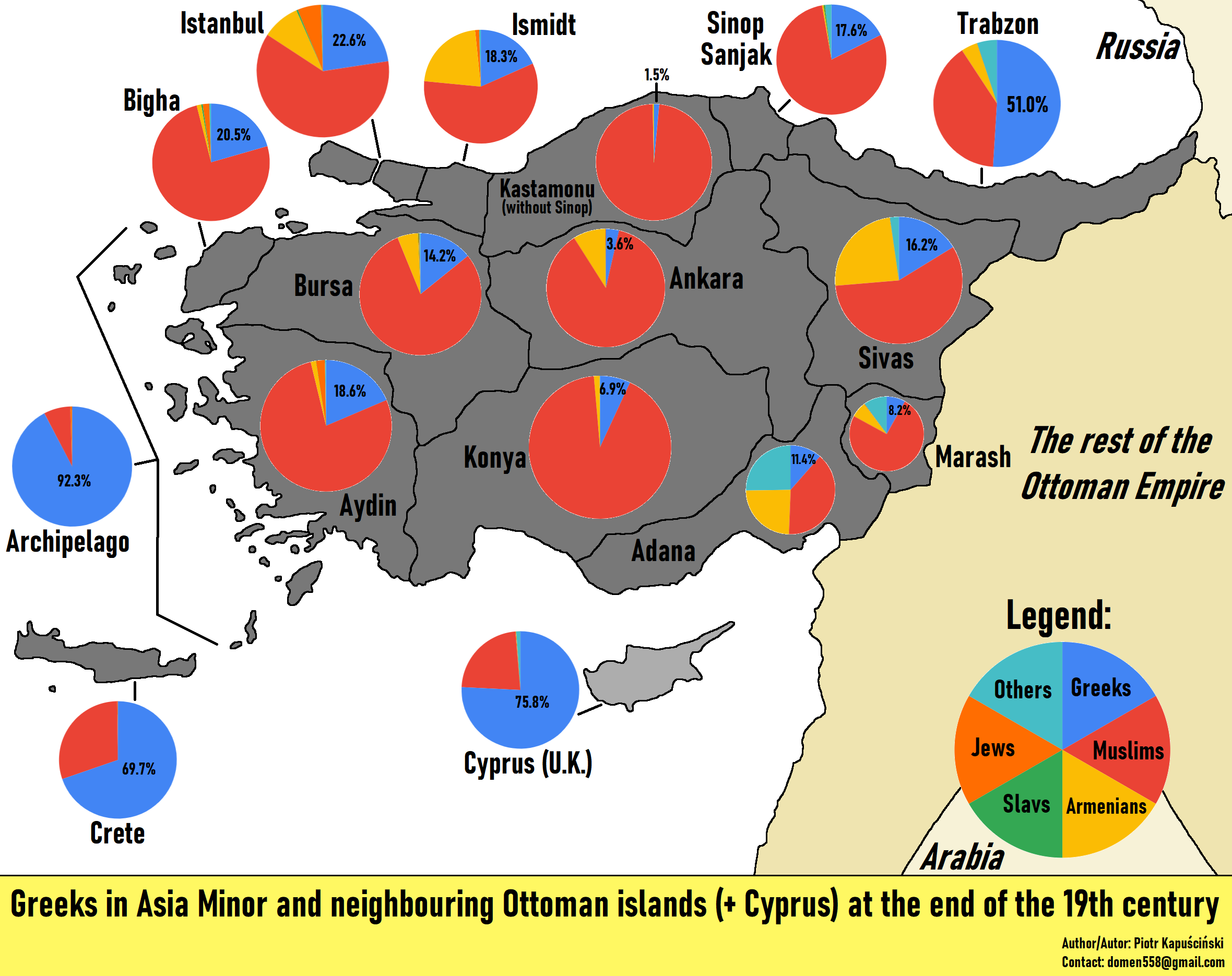
Distribution of ethnic Greek population in Anatolia at the end of the 19th century

Between 1913 and 1923, the Ottoman leadership attempted to expel or kill its native Christian population of Anatolia, including the Pontic Greeks. The genocide was first perpetrated by the Three Pashas and later by the rebel government under Mustafa Kemal. Different scholars have made different estimates for the death toll; most estimates range from 300,000 to 360,000 Pontic Greeks killed. Some notable victims include Matthaios Kofidis and Nikos Kapetanidis. Many were executed, for example during the Amasya trials; others were subject to massacres; many Pontic men were forced to work in labor camps until they died; still others were deported to the interior on death marches. Rape, primarily of Pontic women and girls, was prominent.

In 1923 those still remaining in Turkey were exiled to Greece as part of the population exchange between Greece and Turkey defined by the Treaty of Lausanne. In his book Black Sea, author Neal Ascherson writes:

The Turkish guide-books on sale in the Taksim Meydane offer this account of the 1923 Katastrofĕ: 'After the proclamation of the Republic, the Greeks who lived in the region returned to their own country ...' Their own country? Returned? They had lived in the Pontos for nearly three thousand years. Their Pontian dialect was not understandable to twentieth-century Athenians.

According to the 1928 census of Greece, there were in total 240,695 Pontic Greek refugees in Greece: 11,435 from Russia, 47,091 from the Caucasus, and 182,169 from the Pontus region of Anatolia.

In Turkey, however, together with Crypto-Armenians surfacing it has also given the Pontic community in Turkey more attention, estimates are up to 345,000

== Architecture and settlements ==
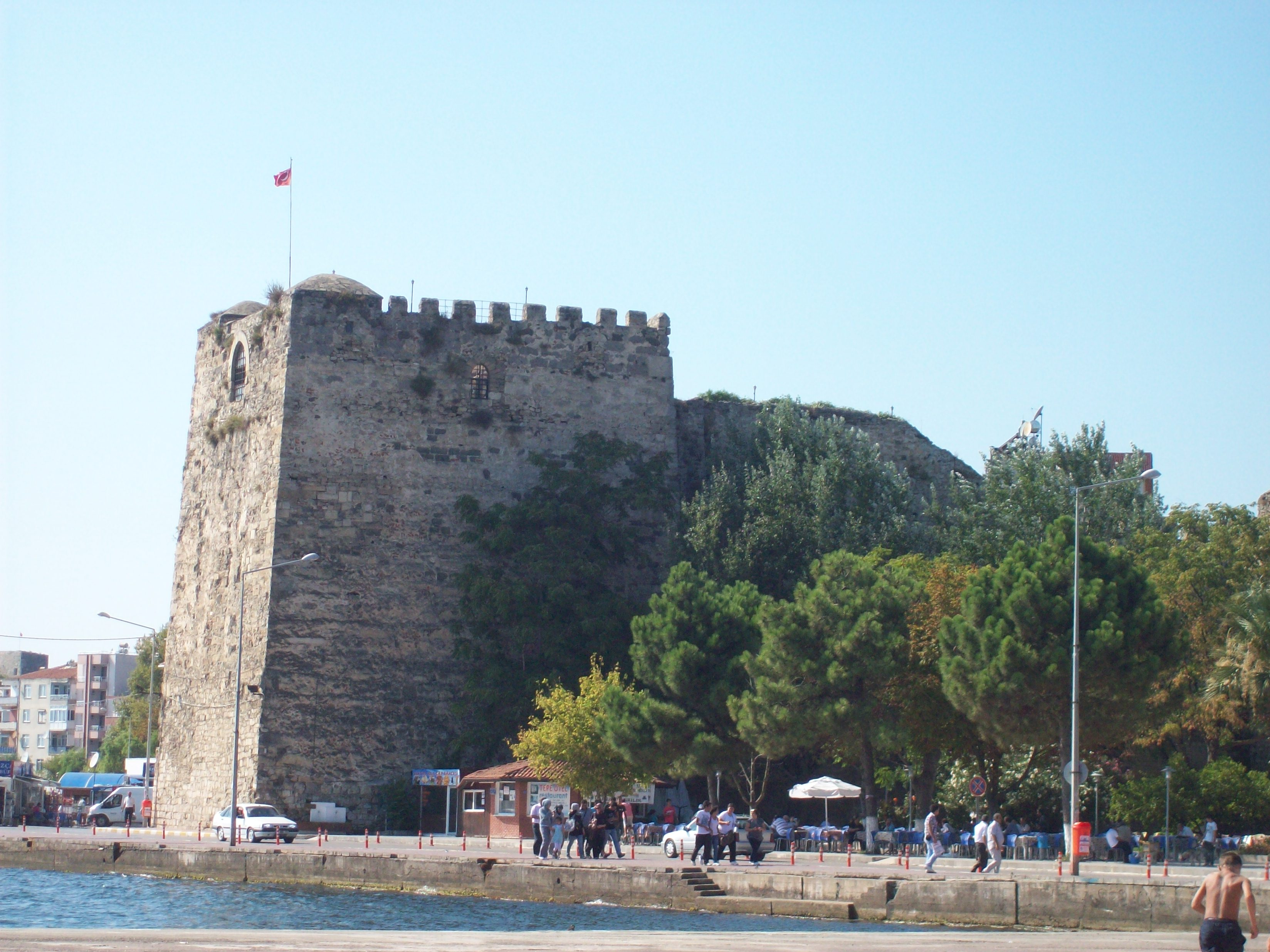
Sinope fortress in 2011

During their millennia-long presence on the Black Sea's southern coast, Pontic Greeks constructed a number of buildings, some of which still stand today. Many structures sit in ruins. Others, however, enjoy active use; one example is Nakip Mosque in Trabzon, originally built as a Greek Orthodox church during the 900s or 1000s.

Ancient Greeks reached and settled the Black Sea by the 700s BC; Sinope was perhaps the earliest colony. According to the Pontic Greek historian Strabo, Greeks from the existing colony of Miletus settled the Pontus region. Some walls from an early fortification stand in the modern Turkish city of Sinop (renamed from Sinope). These fortifications may date back to early Greek colonization in the 600s BC. During late Ottoman and recent Turkish times, the fortress housed a state prison.

Between 281 BC and 62 AD, the Mithridatic kings ruled the Pontos region and called it the Kingdom of Pontus. While the ruling dynasty was Persian in origin, many kings had Greek ancestry, as Pontic rulers often married Seleucid nobility. Some of these Persian/Greek rulers were interred in the Tombs of the kings of Pontus. Their necropolis is still visible in Amasya.

One Pontic king, Pharnaces I of Pontus, may have built Giresun Castle in the 100s BC. There's also a chance it was built during medieval times. From the castle, the Black Sea and much of Giresun are visible.

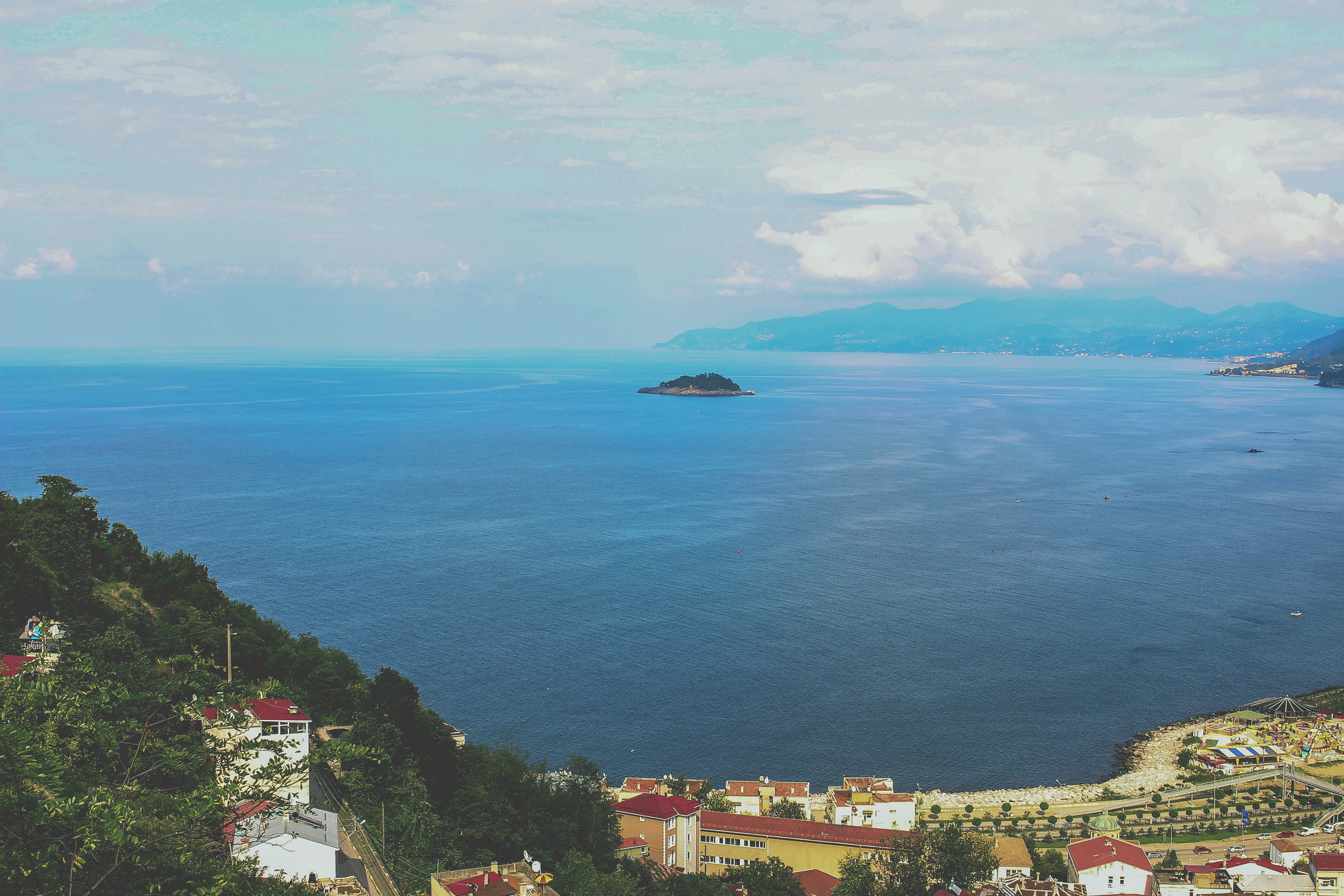
Kerasounta Island, used by Ancient Greek colonists as early as the 5th century BC

Many other structures date back to Greek occupation in ancient times. Ancient Greeks inhabited Giresun, then called Kerasous, from the 5th century BC. During this time, they must also have used Giresun Island. The poet Apollonius of Rhodes mentioned this island in his best-known epic, the Argonautica. Altars on the island date to the Classical or Hellenistic period. Its use as a religious center continued after the rise of Christianity in the region. During Byzantine times, likely in the 400s or 500s AD, a monastic complex was built on the island, dedicated to either St Phocas of Sinope or Mary. It functioned both as a religious center and as a fortress.

Many old Pontic Greek city-states remain in ruins. One is Athenae, an archaeological site near modern Pazar. It sat on the Black Sea coast and housed a temple to Athena.

After Christianity spread to the Pontus region in Roman times, Pontic Greeks began constructing a number of churches, monasteries, and other religious buildings. The Virgin Mary Monastery in Şebinkarahisar District, Giresun Province may be one of the oldest Greek Orthodox monasteries in the region; Turkish archaeologists suspect it may date to the 2nd century. The monastery is made of carved stone and built into a cave. As of the mid-2010s, it was open for tourism.

Other religious buildings were constructed later. Three ruined monasteries lie in Maçka, Trabzon Province: Panagias Soumela Monastery, Saint George Peristereotas Monastery, and Vazelon Monastery. These were built during early Byzantine times. Vazelon Monastery, for example, was built around 270 AD, and it retained great political and societal importance until its abandonment in 1922/3. While St. George Monastery (also called Kuştul Monastery) and Vazelon are abandoned, Sumela is a prominent tourist attraction.

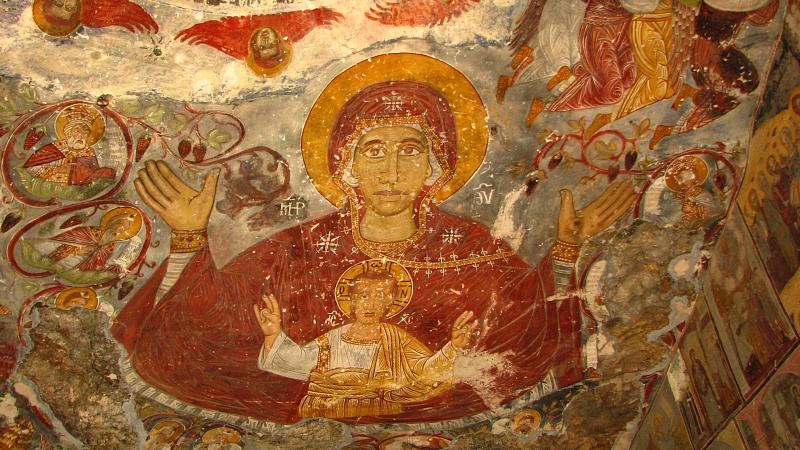
Fresco depicting Mary and Jesus in Sumela Monastery

Pontic Greeks also constructed a number of non-religious buildings during Byzantine times. In the 500s, for example, a castle was built in Rize on the order of Justinian I. It was later expanded. The old fortress still stands today, serving tourists.

Later, the Pontians built further churches and castles. Balatlar Church is a Byzantine church dating back to 660. It lies on the Black Sea coast. Despite vandalism and natural deterioration, the church still has old frescoes, which have been of interest to modern historians. The actual structure itself may date to Roman times. It likely had different uses over the centuries, potentially being a public bath and gymnasium before its use as a church. Pottery found at the site dates to the Roman and Hellenistic eras. There is also speculation that a piece of the True Cross was found at Balatlar Church; however, it's more likely that the materials found were actually the relics of a saint or other holy person.

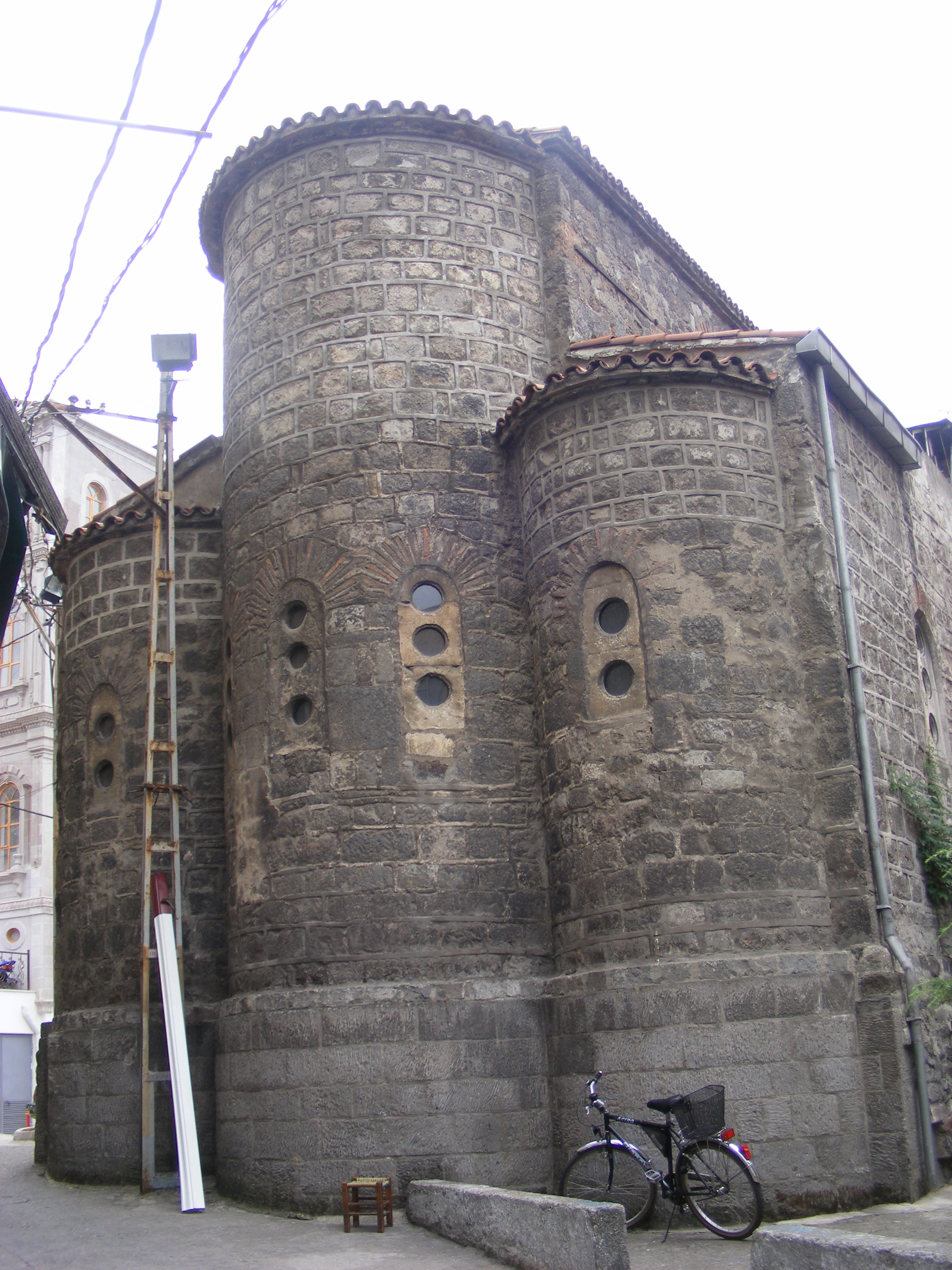
Saint Anne Church, one of the oldest churches in Trebizond

Trabzon has at least three more late Byzantine churches that stand today. St. Anne Church, as the name suggests, was dedicated to Saint Anne, the mother of Mary. While the actual date of construction is uncertain, it was restored by the Byzantine emperors in 884 and 885. It had three apses and a tympanum over the door. Unlike many churches in Trabzon, there is no evidence of it being converted into a mosque following Ottoman conquest in 1461.

Two other structures in Trabzon, built as churches in Byzantine or Trapezuntine times, are now functional mosques. The New Friday Mosque, for example, was originally the Hagios Eugenios Church dedicated to Saint Eugenios of Trebizond. Another is Fatih Mosque. It was originally the Panagia Chrysokephalos church, a cathedral in Trabzon. The name is fitting; fatih means "conqueror" in both Ottoman and modern Turkish.

Another church, Trabzon's Hagia Sophia, was perhaps built by Manuel I Komnenos. It was used as a mosque after Turkish conquest; the frescoes may have been covered for Muslim worship. Hagia Sophia underwent restoration work in the mid-20th century.

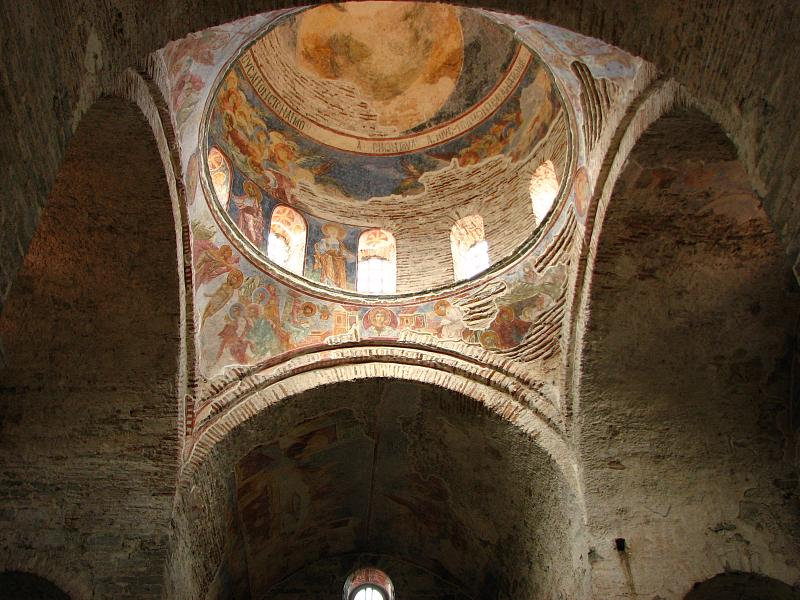
Dome of Trebizond's Hagia Sophia

After European invaders sacked Constantinople in 1204, the Byzantine Empire fractured. The Pontus region went into the hands of the Komnenos family, who ruled the new Empire of Trebizond.

During the Empire of Trebizond, many new structures were built. One is Kiz Castle in Rize Province. The castle sits on an islet just off the Black Sea coast. According to Anthony Bryer, a British Byzantinist, it was built in the 1200s or 1300s on the order of Trapezuntine rulers. Zilkale Castle is another fortress in Rize Province. According to the same historian, it may have been built by the Empire of Trebizond for local Hemshin rulers. Yet another fortress, the Kov Castle in Gümüşhane Province, may have been built by Trapezuntine Emperor Alexios III.

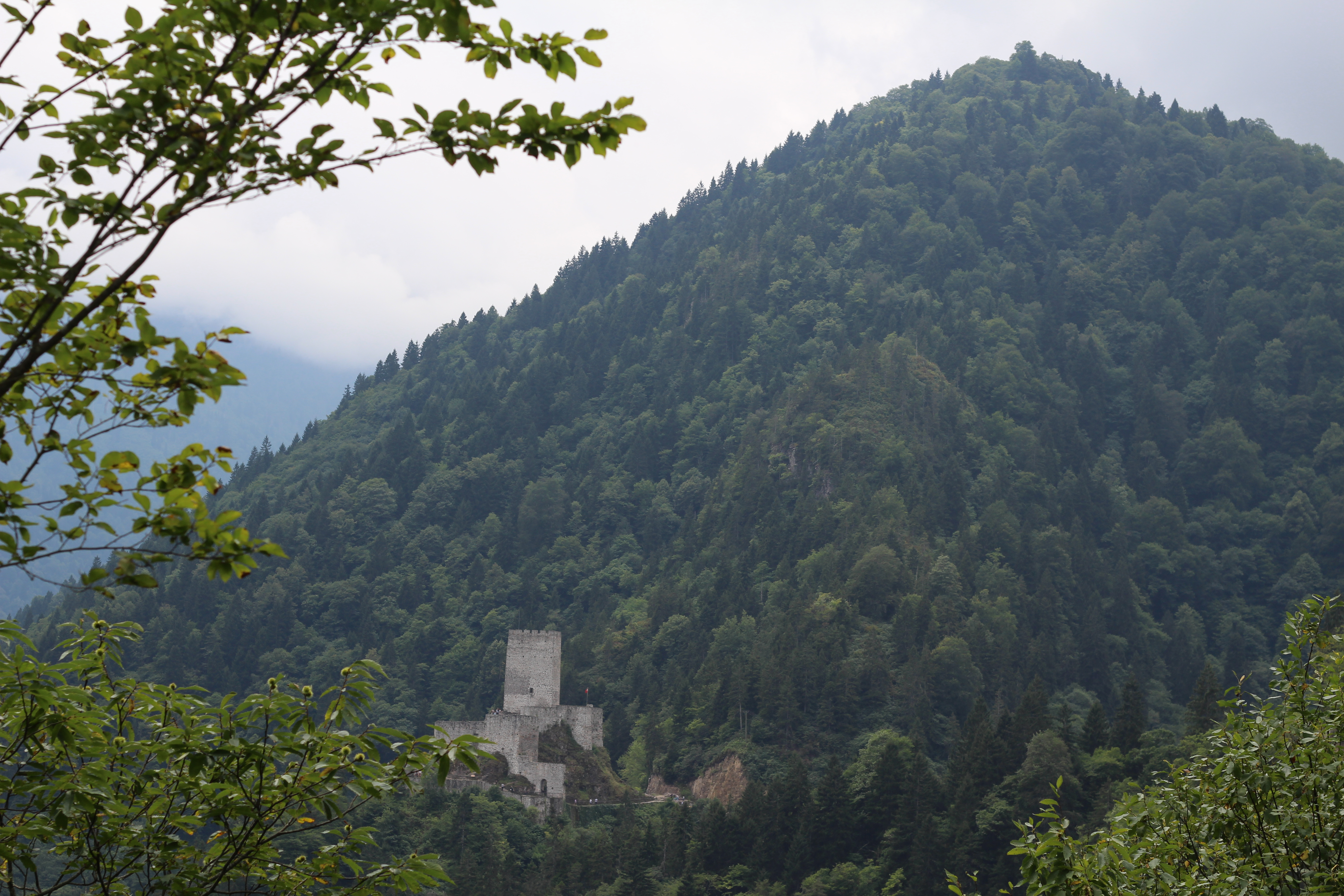
Zilkale in the Pontic Alps in Çamlıhemşin, Rize Province

Alexios III, one of the last emperors under whom the Empire of Trebizond flourished, built Panagia Theoskepastos Monastery in the 1300s. It was an all-female monastery in Trabzon. The monastery may undergo restoration work to boost tourism.

After Mehmed the Conqueror lay siege to Trabzon in 1461, the Empire of Trebizond fell. Many church buildings became mosques around this time, while others remained in the Greek Orthodox community.

Pontic Greeks continued to live and build under Ottoman rule. For example, Pontians in Gümüşhane established the valley town of Santa (today called Dumanlı) in the 1600s. Even today, many of the stone schools, houses, and churches built by Santa's Greek Orthodox residents still stand.

They weren't divorced from Ottoman society, however; Pontic Greeks also contributed their labor to Ottoman construction projects. In 1610, Pontians built the Hacı Abdullah Wall in Giresun Province. The wall is 6.5 km (4.0 mi) long.

Trabzon remained an important center of Pontic Greek society and culture throughout Ottoman times. A scholar named Sevastos Kyminitis founded the Phrontisterion of Trapezous, a Greek school operating in Trabzon from the late 1600s to the early 1900s. It was an important center for Greek-language education across the whole Pontus region. Some students came from outside of Trabzon to learn there (one example being Nikos Kapetanidis, who was born in Rize).

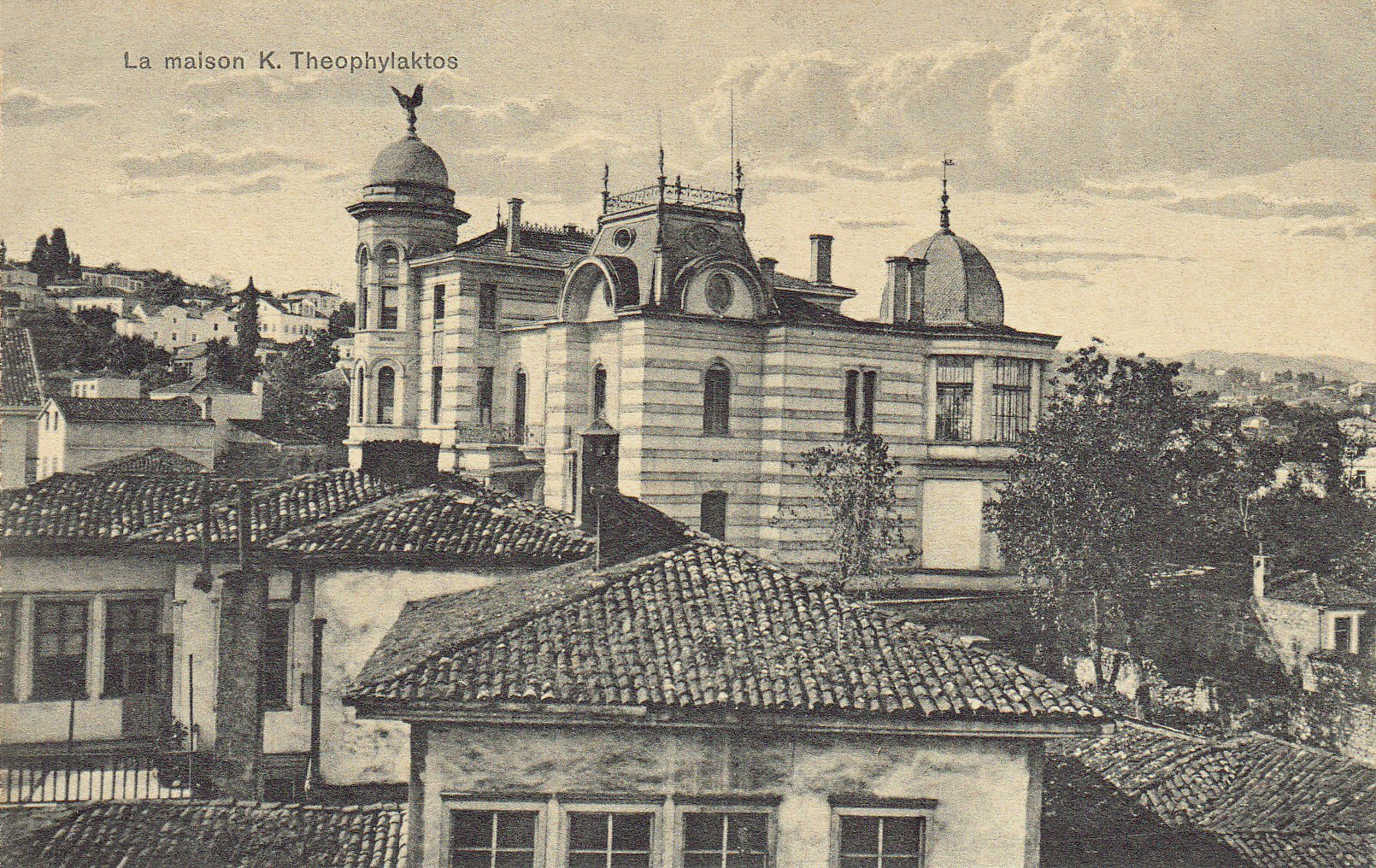
Konstantinos Theofylaktos' mansion in Trebizond before it was converted to Trabzon Museum

After the Ottoman Reform Edict of 1856 guaranteed more religious freedom and civic equality for the Ottoman Empire's Jews and Christians, new churches were constructed. One of these was the church at Cape Jason in Perşembe, Ordu Province. Local Georgians and Greeks built this church in the 1800s; it remains today. Another was the small stone church in Çakrak, Giresun Province. Still another was Taşbaşı Church in Ordu, built in the 1800s; after the Greek Orthodox were expelled from Turkey, it saw some use as a prison. Many other less-notable churches remain throughout the Pontus region.

Some of the old houses once belonging to Pontic Greeks still stand. For example, Konstantinos Theofylaktos, a wealthy Greek, had a mansion built for him in Trabzon. It now functions as Trabzon Museum.

Many structures have not survived to the present day. One example of this is Saint Gregory of Nyssa Church, Trabzon, which was dynamited in the 1930s to make way for a new building.

=== Settlements ===
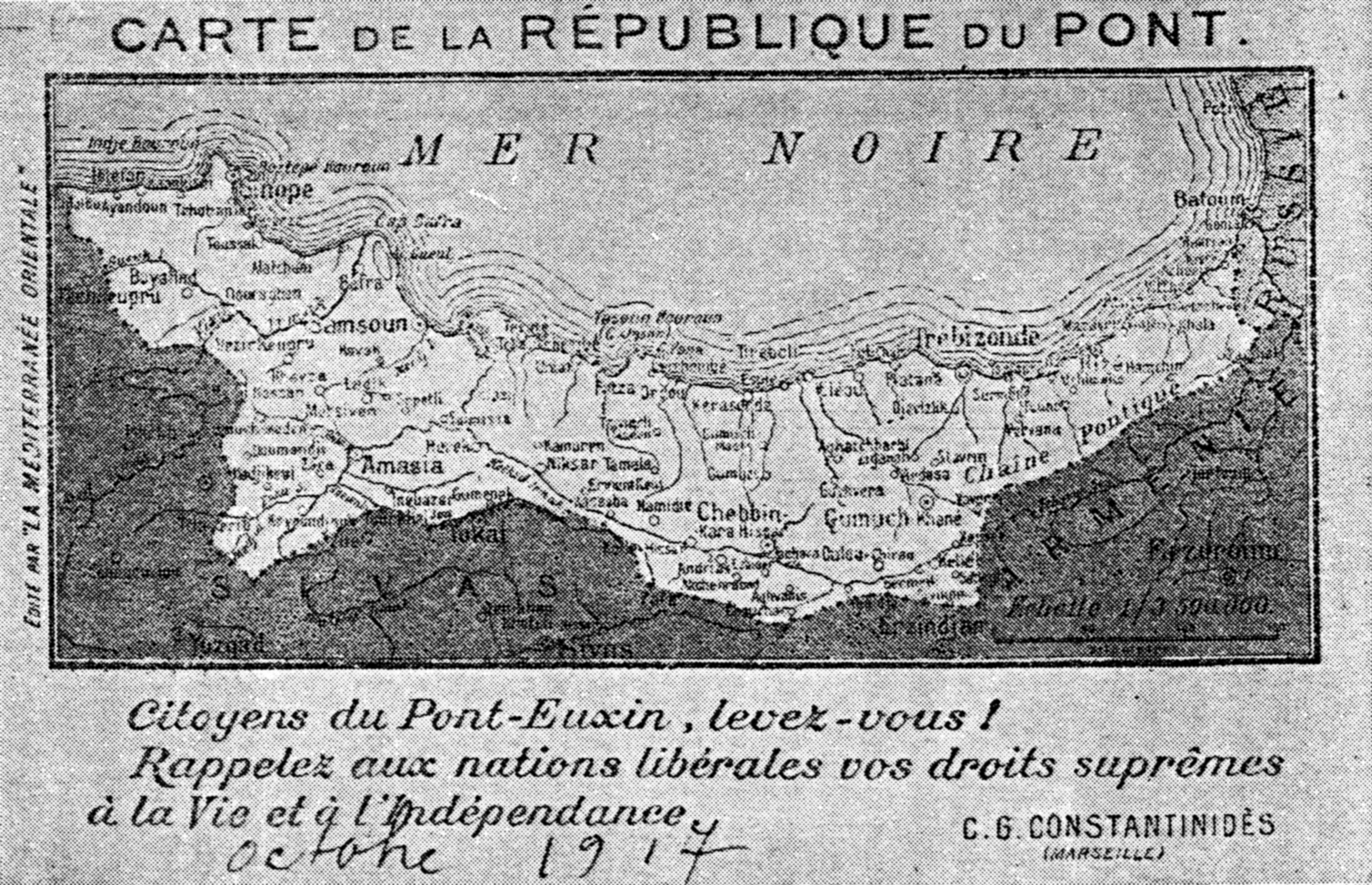
The area claimed for the Republic of Pontus after World War I, based on the extent of the six local Greek Orthodox bishoprics.

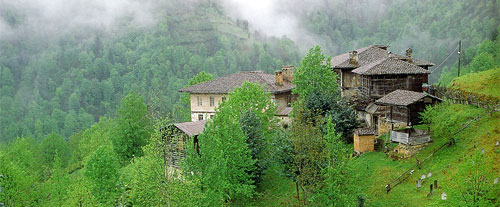
Traditional rural Pontian houses

Some of the settlements historically inhabited by Pontian Greeks include (current official names in parentheses):

In Pontus proper
Amasea, Samsunda (Amisos), Aphene, Argyrion (Akdağmadeni), Argyropolis (Gümüşhane), Athina (Pazar), Bafra, Comana Pontica (Gümenek), Etonia (Gümüşhacıköy), Fatsa, Galiana (Konaklar), Gemoura (Yomra), Hopa, Imera (Olucak), Kakatsis, Kelkit, Cerasus(Giresun), Kissa (Fındıklı), Kolonia (Şebinkarahisar), Nikopolis (Koyulhisar), Kotyora (Ordu), Kromni (Yağlıdere), Livera (Yazlık), Matsouka (Maçka), Meletios (Mesudiye), Myrsiphon (Merzifon), Mouzena (Aydınlar), Neocaesarea (Niksar), Ofis (Of), Oinoe (Ünye), Platana (Akçaabat), Rizounta (Rize), Santa (Dumanlı), Sinope (Sinop), Sourmena (Sürmene), Therme (Terme), i.e. the ancient of the Themiscyra, Evdokia (Tokat), Thoania (Tonya), Trebizond (Trabzon), Tripolis (Tirebolu), Cheriana (Şiran).

Outside Pontus proper
Adapazarı, Palea (Balya), Baiberdon (Bayburt), Efchaneia (Çorum), Sebastia (Sivas), Theodosiopolis (Erzurum), Erzincan (see below on Eastern Anatolia Greeks) and in the so-called Russian Asia Minor (see Batum Oblast, Kars Oblast' and Caucasian Greeks) and the so-called Russian Trans-Caucasus or Transcaucasia (see Černomore Guberniya, Kutais Guberniya, Tiflis Guberniya, Bathys Limni, Dioskourias (Sevastoupolis), Gonia, Phasis, Pytius and Tsalka).

In Crimea and the northern Azov Sea
Chersonesos, Symbolon (Balaklava), Kerkinitida, Panticapaeum, Soughdaia (Sudak), Tanais, Theodosia (Feodosiya).

On the Taman peninsula and Krasnodar Krai, Stavropol Krai (in particular Essentuki)
Germonassa, Gorgippa (Anapa), Heraclea Pontica, Phanagoria.

On the southwestern coast of Ukraine and the Eastern Balkans
Antiphilos, Apollonia (Sozopol), Germonakris, Mariupol, Mesembria (Nesebar), Nikonis, Odessos (Varna), Olbia, Tyras.

== Eastern Anatolia Greeks ==
Ethnic Greeks indigenous to the high plateau of Eastern Anatolia to the immediate south of the boundaries of the Empire of Trebizond – essentially the northern portion of the former Ottoman Vilayet of Erzurum between Erzinjan and Kars province, that is the western half of the Armenian Highlands – are sometimes differentiated from both Pontic Greeks proper and Caucasian Greeks. These Greeks pre-date the refugees and migrants who left their homelands in the Pontic Alps and moved onto the Eastern Anatolian plateau after the fall of the Empire of Trebizond in 1461. They were mainly the descendants of Greek farmers, soldiers, state officials and traders, who settled in Erzurum province in the late Roman and Byzantine Empire period.

Unlike the thoroughly Hellenized areas of the western and central Black Sea coast and the Pontic Alps, the Erzinjan and Erzerum regions were primarily Turkish- and Armenian-speaking, with Greeks forming only a small minority of the population. The Greeks of this region were consequently more exposed to Turkish and Armenian cultural influences than those of Pontus proper, and also more likely to have a strong command of the Turkish language, particular since the areas they inhabited had also been part of the Seljuk Sultanate of Rum and other pre-Ottoman Turkish powers in Central and Eastern Anatolia. Many are also known to have "turned Turk" in both the Seljuk and Ottoman periods, and consequently to have assimilated into Turkish society or reverted to Christian Orthodoxy in the 19th century. Erzurum province was invaded and occupied by the Russian Empire several times in the 19th and early 20th centuries, and large numbers of Eastern Anatolia Greeks are known to have collaborated with the Russians in these campaigns, particularly that of the 1828–29 Russo-Turkish War, alongside Pontic Greeks inhabiting areas to the immediate north of Erzinjan and Erzurum.

As with Pontic Greeks proper, those Eastern Anatolia Greeks who migrated eastwards into Kars province, Georgia, Armenia and Southern Russia between the early Ottoman period and 1829 generally assimilated into the branch of Pontic Greeks usually called Caucasian Greeks. Those who remained and retained their Greek identity into the early 20th century were either deported to the Kingdom of Greece as part of the exchange of populations between Greece and Turkey in 1923-4 or massacred in the Greek genocide that occurred after the larger Armenian genocide in the same part of Anatolia.

== Culture ==
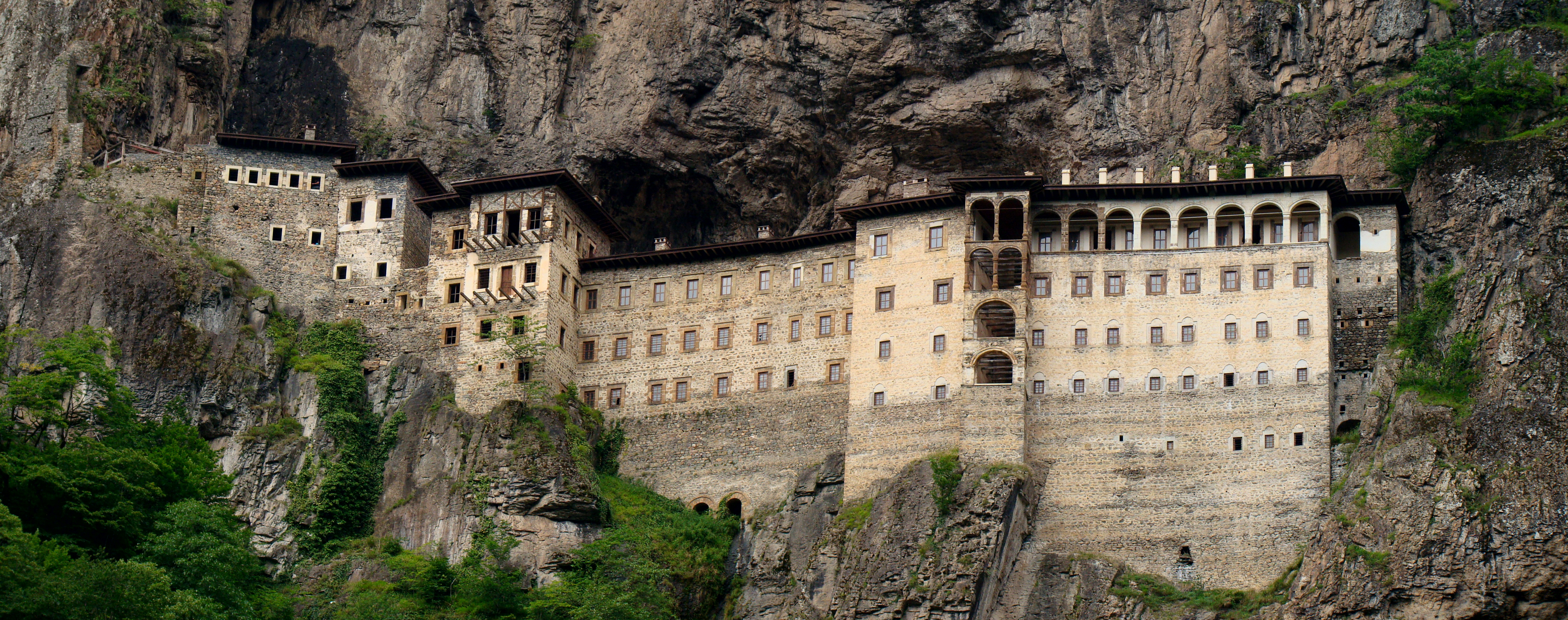
Close-up view of Sümela Monastery

The culture of Pontus has been strongly influenced by the topography of its different regions. In commercial cities like Trebizond, Sampsounta, Kerasounta, and Sinope upper-level education and arts flourished under the protection of a cosmopolitan middle class. In the inland cities such as Argyroupolis, the economy was based upon agriculture and mining, thus creating an economic and cultural gap between the developed urban ports and the rural centers which lay upon the valleys and plains extending from the base of the Pontic alps.

=== Language ===
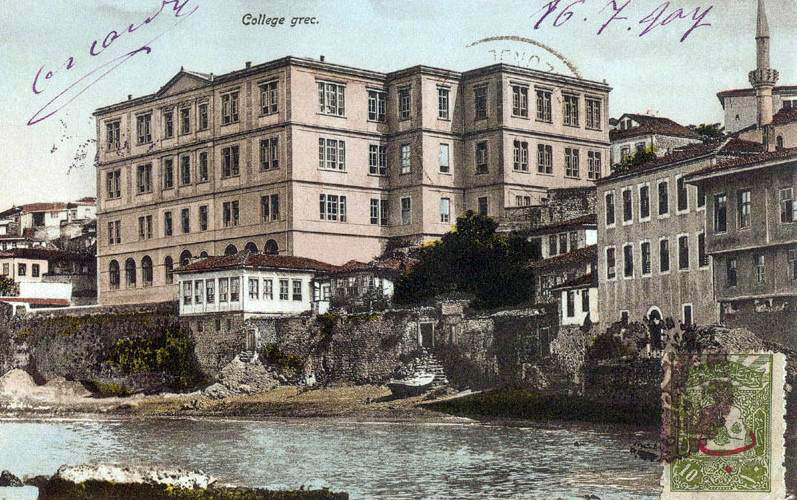
The Phrontisterion of Trapezous, early 20th century

Pontic's linguistic lineage stems from Ionic Greek via Koine and Byzantine Greek with many archaisms and contains loanwords from Turkish and to a lesser extent, Persian and various Caucasian languages.

Tsalka Greeks speak a dialect of Turkish, the Tsalka language.

=== Education ===
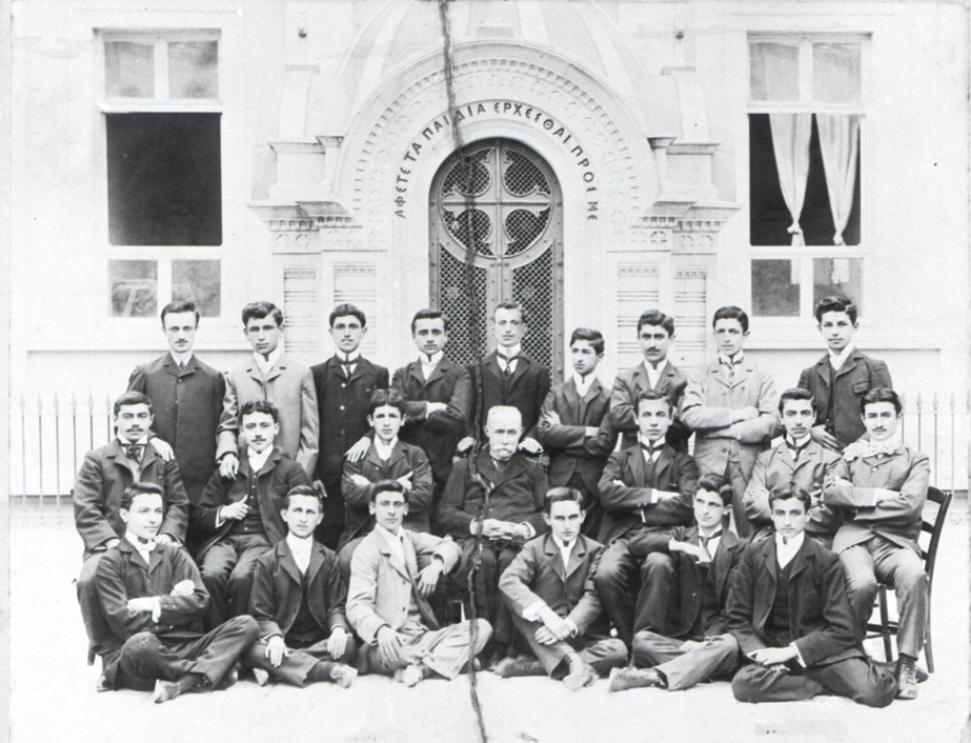
Pontian Greek students and teachers of the Alumni Tuition 1902–1903 in Trebizond

The rich cultural activity of Pontian Greeks is witnessed by the number of educational institutions, churches, and monasteries in the region. These include the Phrontisterion of Trapezous that operated from 1682/3 to 1921 and provided a major impetus for the rapid expansion of Greek education throughout the region. The building of this institution still remains the most impressive Pontic Greek monument in the city.

Another well known institution was the Argyroupolis, built in 1682 and 1722 respectively, 38 highschools in the Sinopi region, 39 highschools in the Kerasounda region, a plethora of churches and monasteries, most notable of which are the St. Eugenios and Hagia Sophia churches of Trapezeus, the monasteries of St. George and St. Ioannes Vazelonos, and arguably the most famous and highly regarded of all, the monastery of Panagia Soumela.

During the 19th century hundreds of schools were constructed by Pontic Greek communities in the Trebizond Vilayet, giving the region one of the highest literacy rates in the Ottoman Empire. The Greeks of Caykara, who according to Ottoman tax records converted to Islam during the 17th century, were also recognized for their educational facilities. Teachers from the Of-valley provided education for thousands of Anatolian Sunni and Sufi students in home schools and small madrassas. Some of these schools taught Pontic Greek alongside Arabic (and to a lesser extent Persian or Ottoman Turkish as well). Although Atatürk banned these madrassas during the early republican period, some of them remained functioning until the second half of the 20th century because of their remote location. The effects of this educational heritage continue to this day, with many prominent religious figures, scientists and politicians coming from the areas influenced by the Naqshbandi Sufi orders of Pontic Greek extraction in Of, Caykara and Rize, among them president Erdogan, whose family originates from the village of Potamia.

=== Music ===
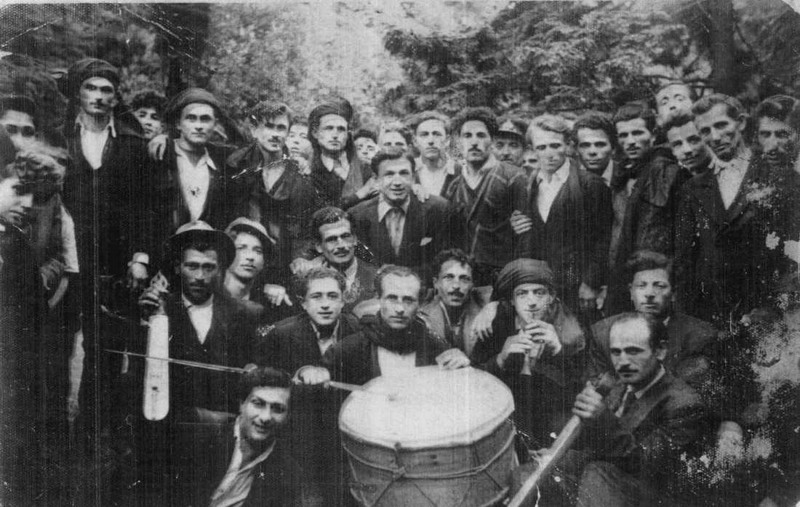
Traditional Pontian musical instruments: kemençe, davul, zurna. Photo from 1950s in Matzouka, Trabzon, Turkey.

Pontian music retains elements of the musical traditions of Ancient Greece, Byzantium, and the Caucasus (especially from the region of Kars). Possibly there is an underlying influence from the native peoples who lived in the area before the Greeks as well, but this is not clearly established.

Musical styles, like language patterns and other cultural traits, were influenced by the topography of Pontos. The mountains and rivers of the area impeded communication between Pontian Greek communities and caused them to develop in different ways. Also significant in the shaping of Pontian music was the proximity of various non-Greek peoples on the fringes of the Pontic area. For this reason we see that musical style of the east Pontos has significant differences from that of the west or southwest Pontos. The Pontian music of Kars, for example, shows a clear influence from the music of the Caucasus and elements from other parts of Anatolia. The music and dances of Turks from Black Sea region are very similar to Greek Pontic and some songs and melodies are common. Except for certain laments and ballads, this music is played primarily to be danced to.

An important part of Pontic music is the Acritic songs, heroic or epic poetry set to music that emerged in the Byzantine Empire, probably in the 9th century. These songs celebrated the exploits of the Akritai, the frontier guards defending the eastern borders of the Byzantine Empire.

The most popular instrument in the Pontian musical collection is the kemenche or lyra, which is related closely with other bowed musical instruments of the medieval West, like the Kit violin and Rebec. Also important are other instruments such as the Angion or Tulum (a type of Bagpipe), the davul, a type of drum, the Shiliavrin, and the Kaval or Ghaval (a flute-like pipe).

The zurna existed in several versions which varied from region to region, with the style from Bafra sounding differently due to its bigger size. The Violin was very popular in the Bafra region and all throughout west Pontos. The Kemane, an instrument closely related to the one of Cappadocia, was highly popular in southwest Pontos and with the Pontian Greeks who lived in Cappadocia. Finally worth mentioning are the Defi (a type of tambourine), Outi and in the region of Kars, the clarinet and accordion.

Popular singers of Pontic music include Stelios Kazantzidis, Chrysanthos Theodoridis, Stathis Nikolaidis, Theodoros Pavlidis, Giannis Tsitiridis, and Pela Nikolaidou.

=== Dance ===
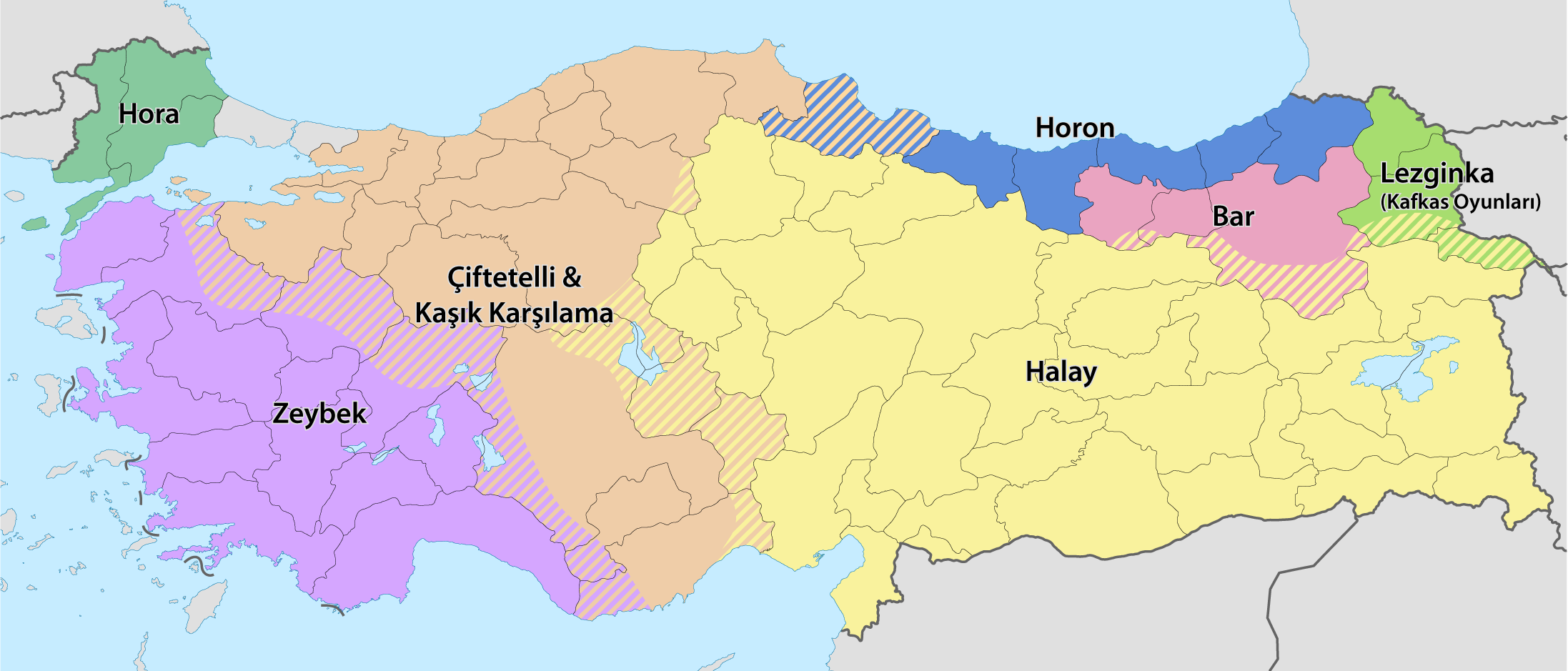
Folk dances in Turkey. Horon in blue.

Pontian dance retains aspects of Persian and Greek dance styles. The dances called Horoi/Choroi (Greek: Χοροί), singular Horos/Choros (Chorus) (Greek: Χορός), meaning literally "Dance" in both Ancient Pontian and Modern Greek languages, are circular in nature and each is characterized by distinct short steps. A unique aspect of Pontian dance is the tremoulo (Greek: Τρέμουλο), which is a fast shaking of the upper torso by a turning of the back on its axis. Like other Greek dances, they are danced in a line and the dancers form a circle. Pontian dances also resemble Persian and Middle Eastern dances because they are not led by a single dancer. The most renowned Pontian dances are Tik (dance), Serra, Maheria or Pyrecheios, Kotsari and Omal. Other, less common, dances include Letsina, Dipat, Podaraki, and Atsiapat.

=== Sport ===
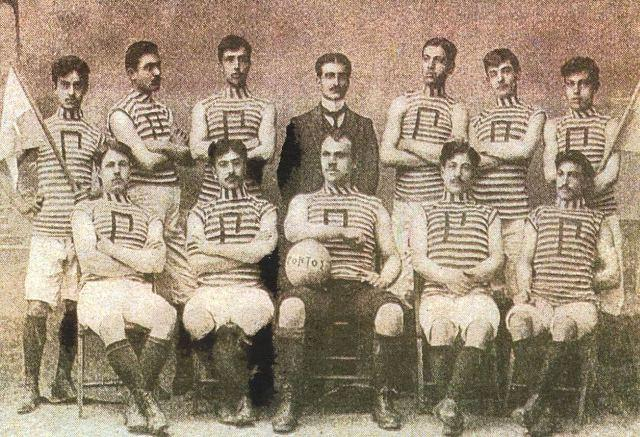
Pontian Greek football team called Pontus Merzifounta.

Pontic Greek history with organised sports began with extra-curricular activities offered by educational institutions. The students would establish athletics clubs providing the Pontic Greek youth with an opportunity to participate in organised sporting competition. The Hellenic Athletic Club, Pontus Merzifounta, founded in 1903 was one such example formed by students attending Anatolia College in Merzifon near Amasya. The college's forced closure in 1921 by the Turkish government resulted in the school's relocation to Greece in 1924, along with much of the Greek population of Asia Minor in the aftermath of genocide and a subsequent treaty that agreed upon a population exchange between Greece and Turkey. This resulted in the establishment of Pontic and Anatolian Greek sporting clubs in Greece, of which football is the sport with which they are most commonly associated. Today a number of these clubs still compete; some at a professional and intercontinental level. Such as:

- Apollon Kalamarias
- AE Pontion Verias
- AO Ellas Pontion
- AE Ponton Evmirou
- AE Ponton Vatalakkou
- AEP Kozanis
- Pontikos Neas Santas'

Outside of Greece, due to the widespread Pontic Greek diaspora, association football clubs also exist. In Australia, the Pontian Eagles SC are a semi-professional team based in Adelaide, South Australia and in Munich, Germany, FC Pontos have an academy relationship with PAOK FC.

Pontic Greeks have also contributed to sporting successes internationally, not limited to but mostly representing Greece, with several team members a part of sports triumphs in major international basketball (2006 FIBA World Championship, Eurobasket 2005) and football tournaments (UEFA Euro 2004). Champion individuals of Pontic Greek origin have also emerged in World Championship and Olympic levels of competition for athletics (Katerina Stefanidi, Voula Patoulidou), gymnastics (Ioannis Melissanidis), diving (Nikolaos Siranidis), taekwondo (Alexandros Nikolaidis) and kick-boxing (Mike Zambidis, Stan Longinidis).

=== Military tradition ===
On 19 May of each year, the Evzonoi of the Greek Army Presidential Guard ceremonial unit wear the traditional black Pontic uniform to commemorate the Pontic genocide.

=== Cuisine ===
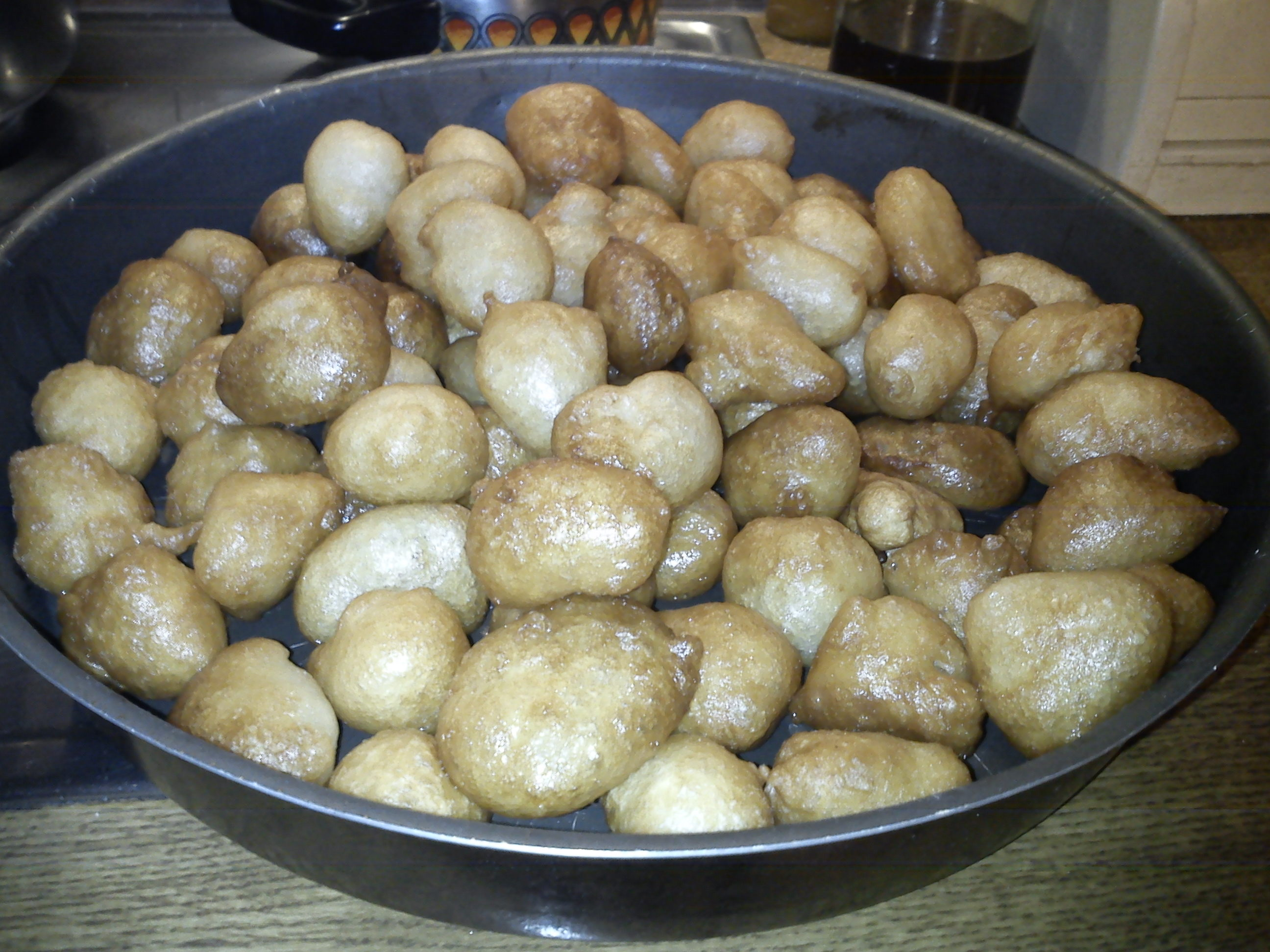
Tsirichtá

Today, Pontic Greek cuisine is mostly found in the northern part of Greece. Culinary traditions have played an integral role in the preservation of Pontic Greek identity. Dairy products, grains, and vegetables are commonly used. Pontic cuisine specialities include:

- Felia (φελία), Pontian French toast
- Kinteata (κιντέατα), nettle soup
- Otía (pnt) (ωτία), fried dessert
- Pirozhki (πιροσκί)
- Pishía (pnt) (πιςία), Pontian boortsog
- Pita, flatbread
- Sousamópita (σουσαμόπιτα)
- Tanoménon sorvá or Tanofái (τανωμένον σορβά, τανοφάι), soup made with onions and yogurt
- Tsirichtá (pnt) (τσιριχτά), type of loukoumades
- Siron (pnt) (σιρόν), pasta
- Varenika (βαρένικα), type of ravioli
- Sourva, wheat or barley porridge
- Tan, drink
- Stupa or stupa torshi, pickled vegetables
- Pilav, rice dish. In coastal Pontus, it was sometimes made with mussels. Other versions included pilav with saffron, chicken, or anchovies.
- Dolmades, stuffed leaf dish
- Kibbeh made with lamb and/or beef
- Briami, roasted vegetables
- Havitz (pnt) (Χαβίτς), porridge
- Perek (Περέκ), pie similar to the Greek tiropita
- Avgolemono, egg-lemon soup
- Kebab, roasted meat
- Mantía (Μαντία), dumplings
- Lalággia (Λαλάγγια), pancakes
- Foustoron, type of omelette
- Mavra laxana, cabbage soup
- Lavashia (Λαβάσια), bread similar to Armenian lavash
- Tsatsoupel, a condiment similar to salsa made from quince, tomato, chili peppers, bell peppers, and a variety of spices
- İmam bayıldın, stuffed eggplant; shared with Turkish cuisine

=== In Greece ===
There are many different views on Pontians in Greece. Pontians may be celebrated as representations of Greek heroism or as near-mythic warriors. However, they have also been stereotyped as simple and backwards rural people. There is a genre of Greek humor, called Pontic anecdotes, that depicts the Pontians as buffoons, while in some Greek slang the word "Pontian" may mean "idiot"; these stem from the pre-1950s reception of the Pontic refugees, and today most Pontians are amused by the anecdotes.

=== Pontic Greeks in popular culture ===
- In the 1984 movie Voyage to Cythera (Ταξίδι στα Κύθηρα), directed by Theodoros Angelopoulos, the protagonist is a Pontian Greek who was deported to the Soviet Union after the Greek civil war. He returns to Greece after 32 years.
- In his 1998 movie From the Edge of the City (Από την άκρη της πόλης), the film director Constantinos Giannaris describes the life of a young "Russian Pontian" from Kazakhstan in the prostitution underworld of Athens.
- In the 1999 movie Soil and Water (Χώμα και νερό), one of the characters is a Pontian Greek from Georgia who works as a woman's trafficker for a strip club.
- In the 2000 memoir Not Even My Name: From a Death March in Turkey to a New Home in America, A Young Girl's True Story of Genocide and Survival by Thea Halo, life in the Pontus region is described by her mother Sano Halo before and after the Greek genocide.
- In the 2000 movie The Very Poor, Inc. (Πάμπτωχοι Α.Ε.), one of the characters is a Pontian Greek from the Soviet Union named Thymios Hloridis. A mathematician with a specialty in chaos theory, Hloridis is forced to make a living selling illegal cigars in front of the stock-market.
- In the 2002 novel Middlesex by Jeffrey Eugenides, one of the side characters is a Pontian-American career criminal named Zizmo.
- In the 2003 Turkish movie Waiting for the Clouds (Bulutlari Beklerken, Περιμένοντας τα σύννεφα), a Pontian Greek woman who didn't leave Pontus as a child with her brother during the population exchange, meets Thanasis, a Pontian Greek man from the Soviet Union, who helps her to find her brother in Greece. The movie makes some references to the Pontic genocide.
- In the 2008 short movie Pontos, written, produced, and directed by Peter Stefanidis, he aims to capture a small part of the genocide from the perspective of its two central characters, played by Lee Mason (Kemal) and Ross Black (Pantzo).
- A 2012 poetry collection, The Black Sea by Stephanos Papadopoulos, depicts the imagined trials and voyages of the Pontic Greek exodus from the region. It was published by Sheep Meadow Press.

== Notable Pontian Greeks ==
=== Ancient ===
- Diogenes of Sinope (412 or 404 BC – 323 BC) (philosopher; founder of Cynic movement)
- Bion of Borysthenes (philosopher)
- Dionysodorus of Amaseia (mathematician)
- Strabo (historian)
- Philetaerus (c. 343–263 BC) (founder of the Attalid dynasty)
- Mithradates VI Eupator (ruler of the Kingdom of Pontus from 120 to 63 BC)
- Marcion of Sinope (85–160 AD) (theologian)
- Aquila of Sinope (c. 130 AD) (translator of Hebrew bible into Greek)
- Evagrius Ponticus (345–399 AD), Christian monk

=== Medieval ===
- Alexios II of Trebizond
- Nicephorus Gregoras
- Constantine Loukites
- Ecumenical Patriarch John VIII
- Ecumenical Patriarch Maximus V
- Michael Panaretos
- George Amiroutzes
- Gregory Choniades
- George of Trebizond
- Basilios Bessarion

=== Modern ===
- Ioannis Amanatidis (footballer)
- Kotza Anastas (guerrilla leader)
- George Andreadis (novelist)
- Peter Andrikidis (film & TV director)
- Diana Anphimiadi (poet)
- Antonis Antoniadis (footballer)
- Joannis Avramidis
- Konstantin Bazelyuk
- A.I. Bezzerides
- Georges Candilis
- Alexander Deligiannidis
- Alex Dimitriades
- Odysseas Dimitriadis (music conductor)
- Ioannis Fetfatzidis
- Adonis Georgiadis
- Georgios Georgiadis (footballer, born 1972)
- Georgios Georgiadis (footballer, born 1987)
- George Gurdjieff
- Nikos Kapetanidis
- Michael Katsidis (boxer)
- Stelios Kazantzidis
- Yevhen Khacheridi
- Matthaios Kofidis
- Savvas Kofidis
- Efkleidis Kourtidis (guerrilla leader)
- Venetia Kotta
- Arkhip Kuindzhi
- Filon Ktenidis
- Mike Lazaridis
- Yuri Lodygin
- Stan Longinidis
- Takis Loukanidis
- Irakli Manelov (footballer)
- Dimitris Melissanidis
- Ioannis Melissanidis
- Kostas Nestoridis
- Alexandros Nikolaidis
- Apostolos Nikolaidis
- Demis Nikolaidis
- Lazaros Papadopoulos
- Stephanos Papadopoulos
- Mimis Papaioannou
- Lefteris Pantazis
- Anton Pasha (guerrilla leader)
- Evangelos Marinakis
- Klavdia Papadopoulou (Eurovision 2025 participant)
- Dimitrios Partsalidis
- Ioannis Passalidis
- Voula Patoulidou (track & field Olympic gold-medal winner)
- Dimitris Psathas
- Viktor Sarianidi
- Ivan Savvidis
- Giourkas Seitaridis
- Nikolaos Siranidis
- Arthur Sissis
- John Sitilides
- Georgios Skliros
- Pamphylia Tanailidi
- Takis Terzopoulos
- Chrysanthos Theodoridis
- Vasilis Torosidis
- Vasilis N. Triantafillidis
- Vladimir Triandafillov
- Matthaios Tsahouridis (musician)
- Iovan Tsaous
- Markos Vafiadis
- Alexandros Ypsilantis
- Demetrios Ypsilantis
- Fyodor Yurchikhin
- Nikos Xanthopoulos (actor & singer)
- Mike Zambidis (kickboxer)
- Arsenios the Cave Dweller

== Gallery ==
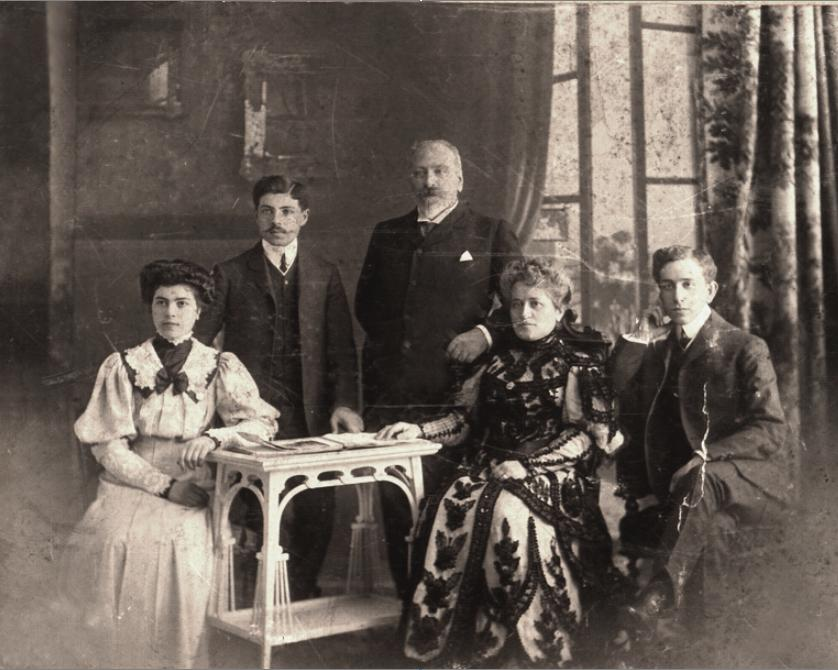
A wealthy Pontic Greek family in Geneva

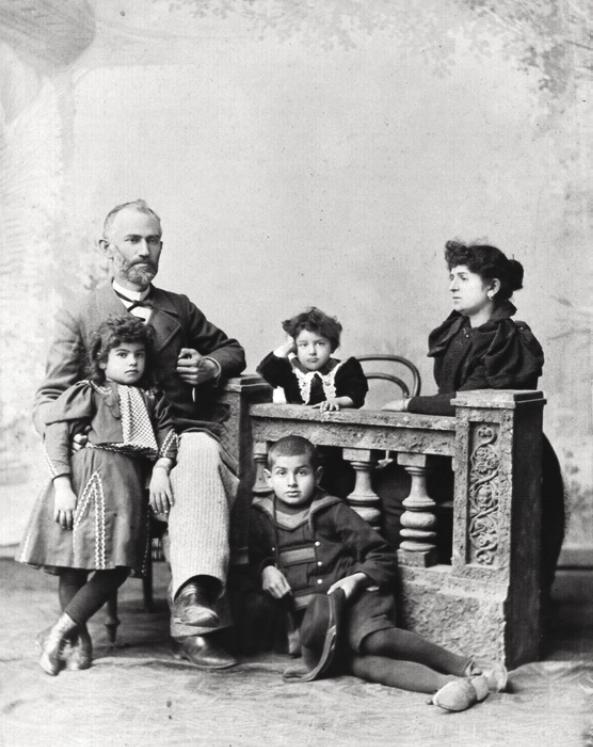
A middle-class Pontic Greek family

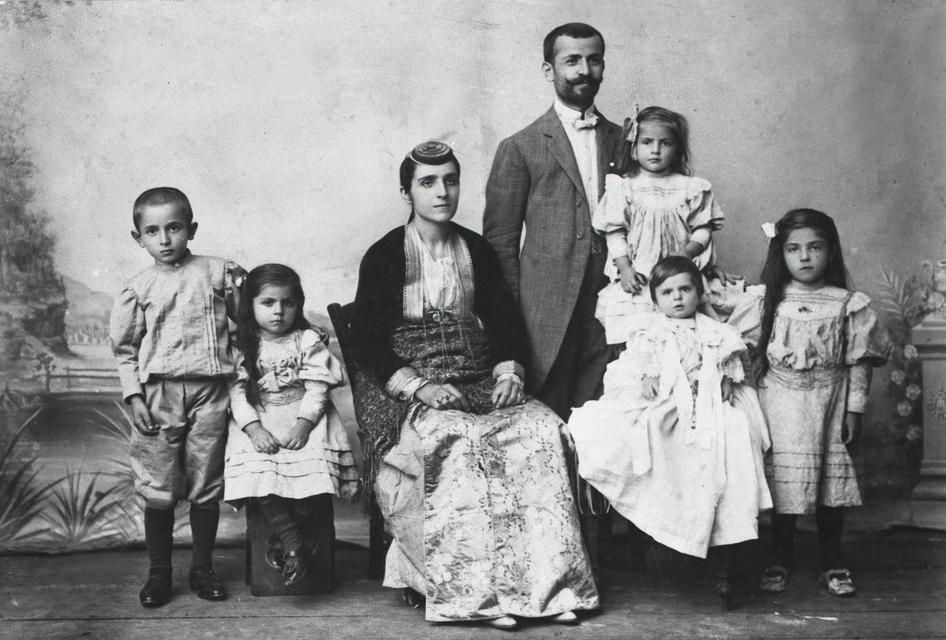
Pontian Greek family of Kerasounta

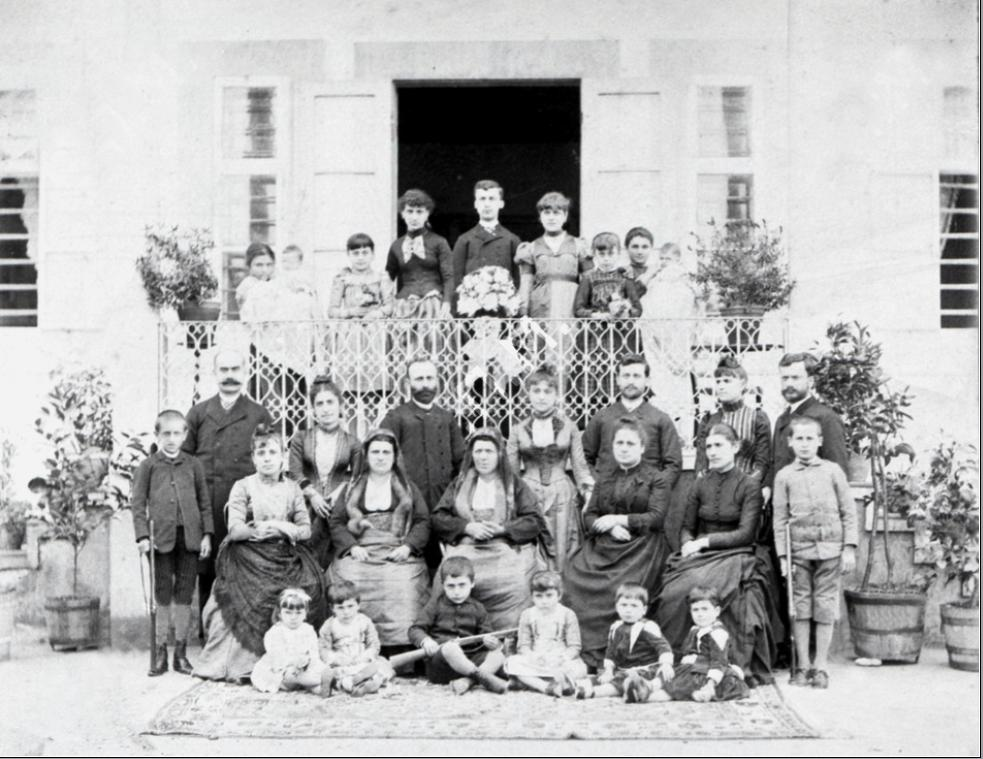
Pontic Greek family in the courtyard of a Trapezounta house (modern Trabzon, Turkey)

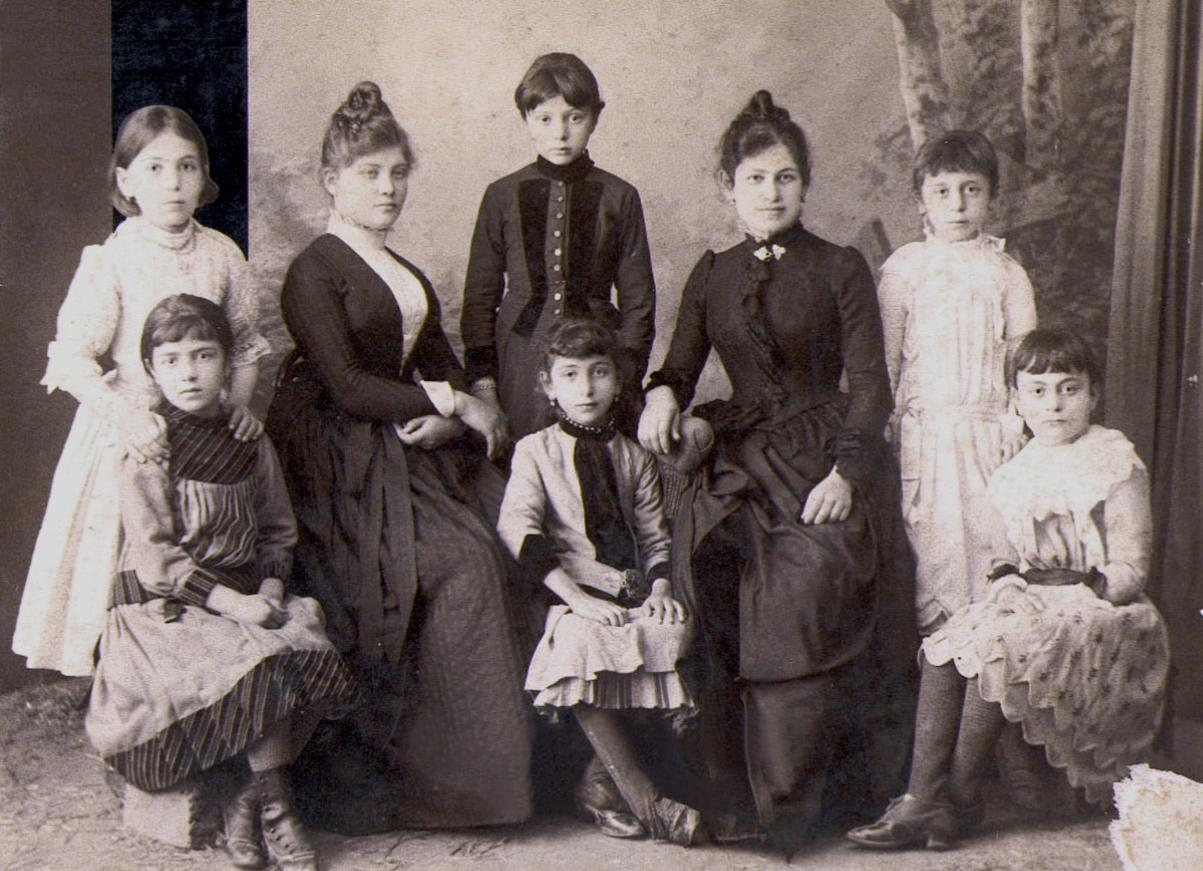
Pontian Greek ladies and children of Trapezounta

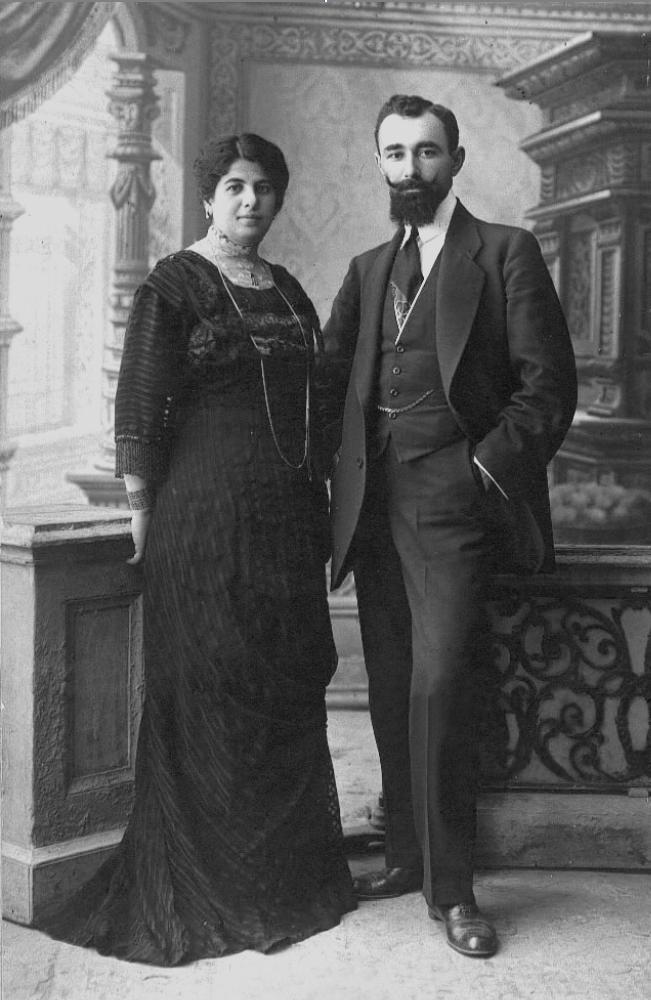
Pontic Greek couple in Trapezounta

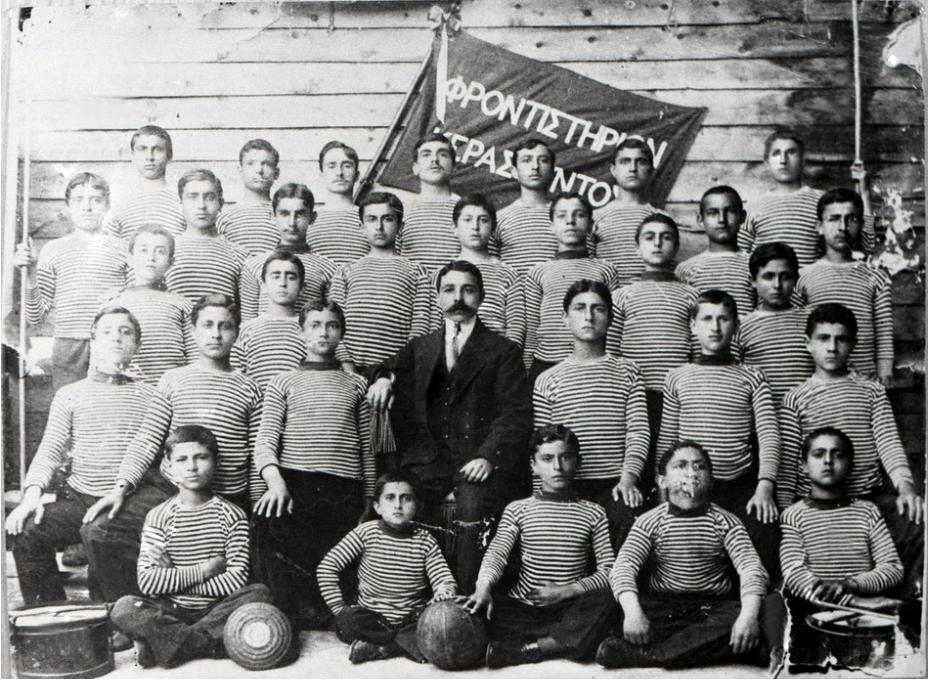
Pontian Greek athletics team from Kerasounta (modern Giresun, Turkey)

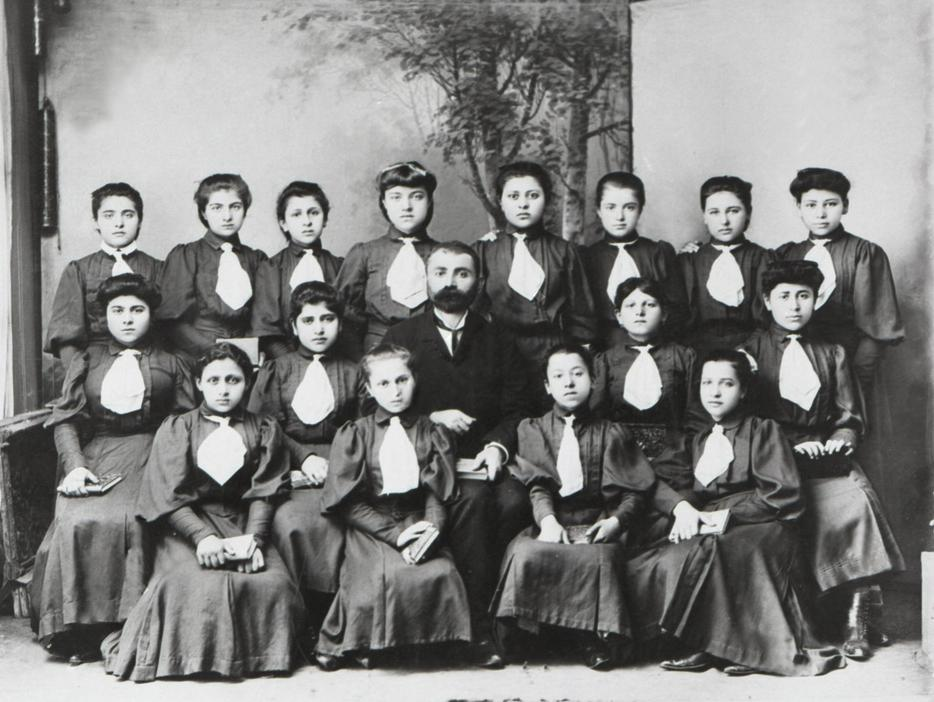
Pontian Greek female students of Trapezounta

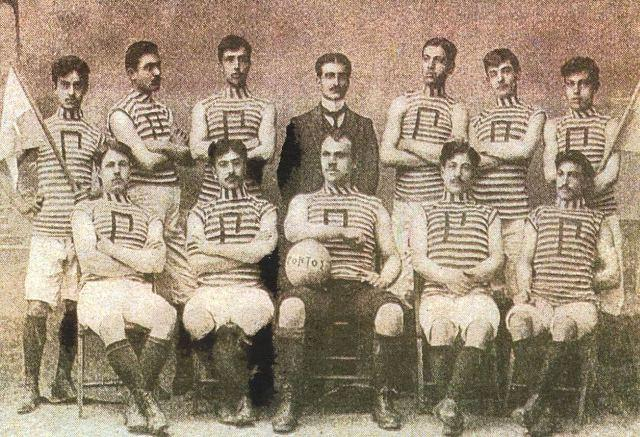
Pontian Greek soccer team called 'Pontos'

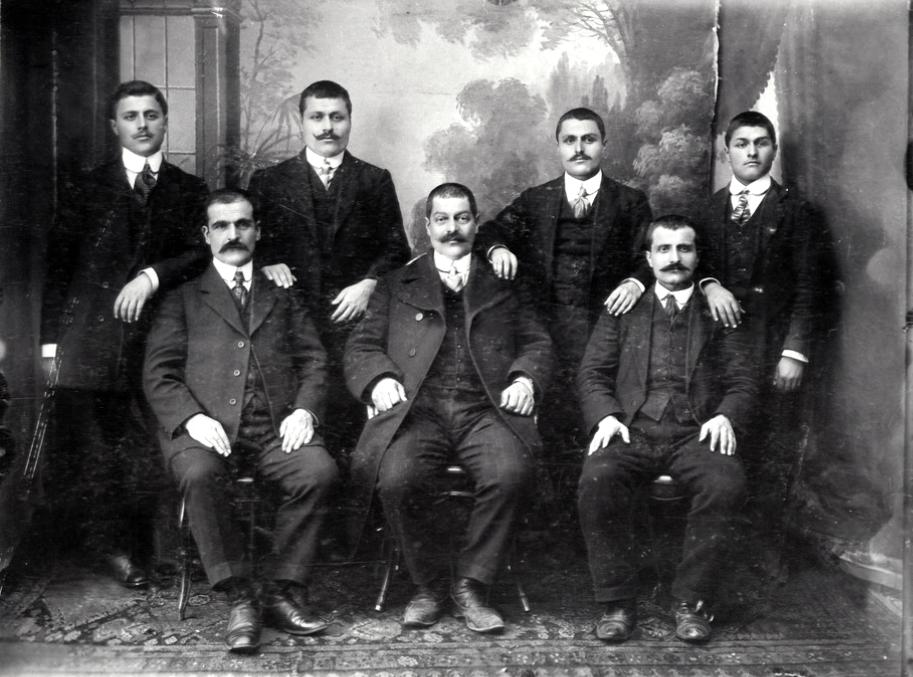
Pontic Greeks in Batumi, Georgia

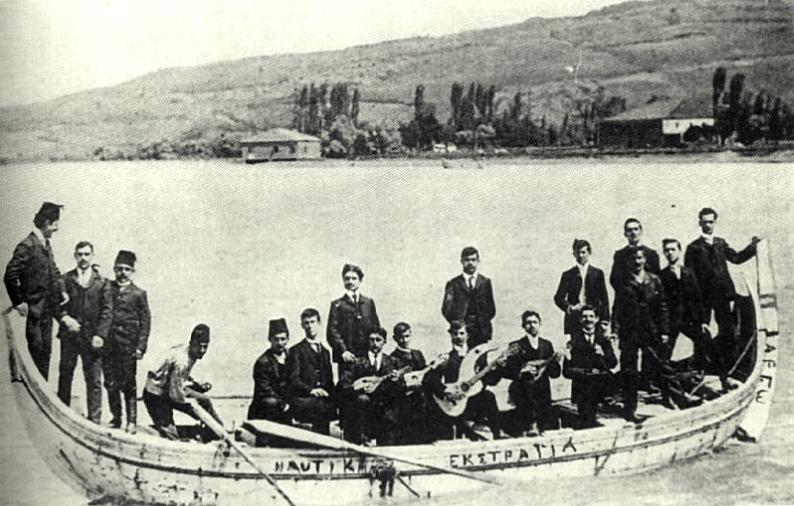
Pontian Greek Canoe, off the coast of Trapezounta

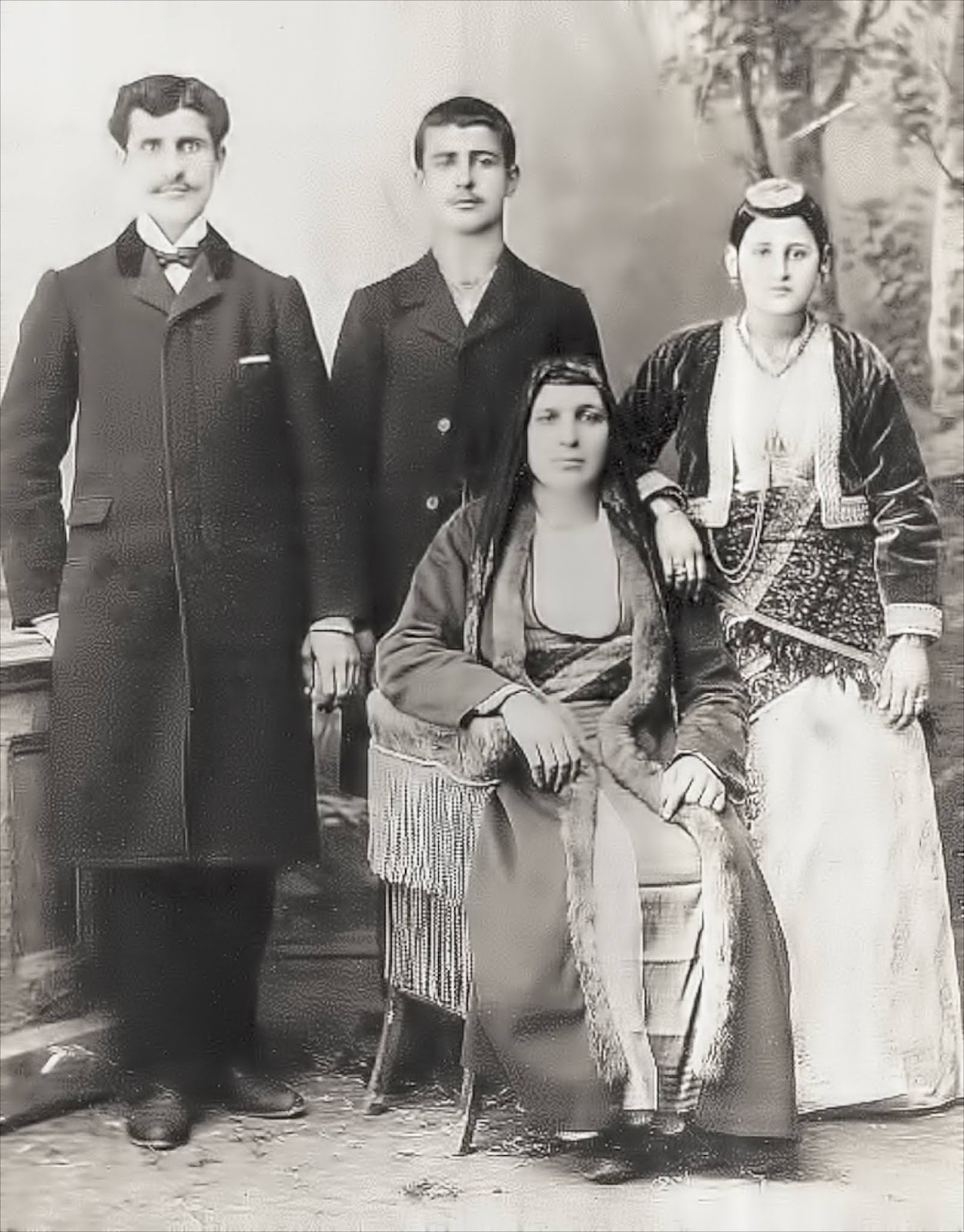
Pontic family of Russia at the beginning of the century, wearing traditional costume.

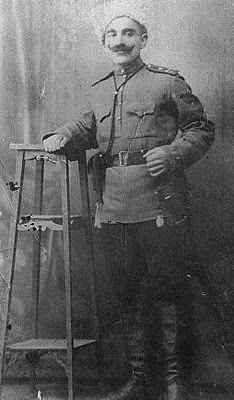
Pontic Greek from the Caucasus as member of the Russian Imperial Army

== See also ==
- Yannis Vasilis, a former ultra-nationalist Turk, turned pacifist and promoter of his Greek heritage

== Bibliography ==
- Berikashvili, Svetlana. Morphological aspects of Pontic Greek spoken in Georgia. LINCOM GmbH, 2017. ISBN 978-3-8628-8852-8
- Bruneau, Michel (2015). "Le patrimoine menacé des Grecs pontiques, entre Turquie et Grèce". Anatoli (in French). 6 (6). doi:10.4000/anatoli.315.
- Halo, Thea. Not Even My Name. Picador. 2000. ISBN 978-0-312-26211-2.
- Hofmann, Tessa, ed. Verfolgung, Vertreibung und Vernichtung der Christen im Osmanischen Reich 1912–1922. Münster: LIT, 2004. ISBN 978-3-8258-7823-8
- Tsekouras, Ioannis (2016). Nostalgia, Emotionality, and Ethno-Regionalism in Pontic Parakathi Singing (PhD). University of Illinois at Urbana-Champaign.
