= Phrontisterion of Trapezous =

- Φροντιστήριον Τραπεζούντος
- Trabzon (Trapezous); Ottoman Empire

Information
- Established: 1682/3
- Closed: 1921
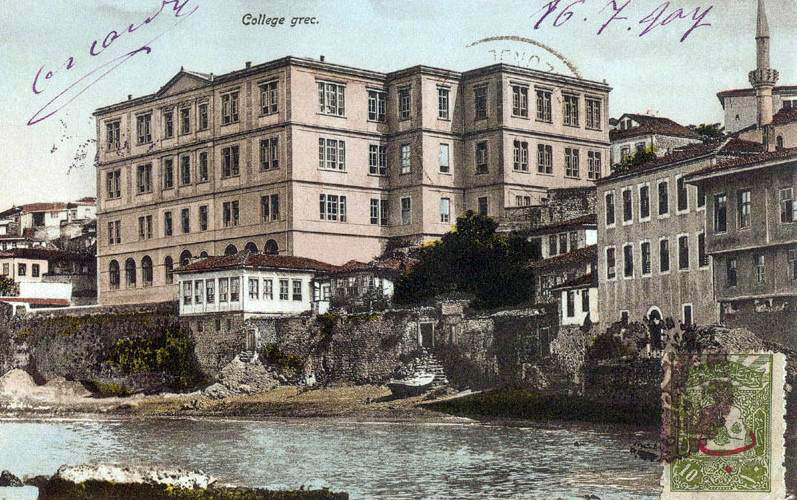
- The school building, early 20th century

The Phrontisterion of Trapezous (Greek: Φροντιστήριον Τραπεζούντος, "Trapezous College") was a Greek educational institution that operated from 1682/3 to 1921 in Trabzon (Gr. Τραπεζούς, Trapezous), in the Ottoman Empire, now Turkey. It provided a major impetus for the rapid expansion of Greek education throughout the Pontus region, on the south coast of the Black Sea. The building still retains its function as a prestigious highschool, and it has been considered as the most impressive Pontic Greek monument in Trabzon.

== Background ==
In the Middle Ages, Trabzon was the capital of the Empire of Trebizond, one of the successor states to the Byzantine Empire, and the last Greek state to be annexed by the Ottomans, in 1461. During the following centuries a strong Greek community continued to live in the city and the Pontus region.

== History ==
The school was founded by Sevastos Kyminitis, a forerunner of the modern Greek Enlightenment, in 1682/3 and became the most influential center of Greek education in Pontus. The school was initially housed at the Sümela Monastery, with its main goal being the cultivation of the national and religious identity of the local Greek communities. The school was supported by generous donations granted by wealthy Greek families, including the Velissarides and Kallivazis families, members of which controlled trade in most of the Black Sea Ports.

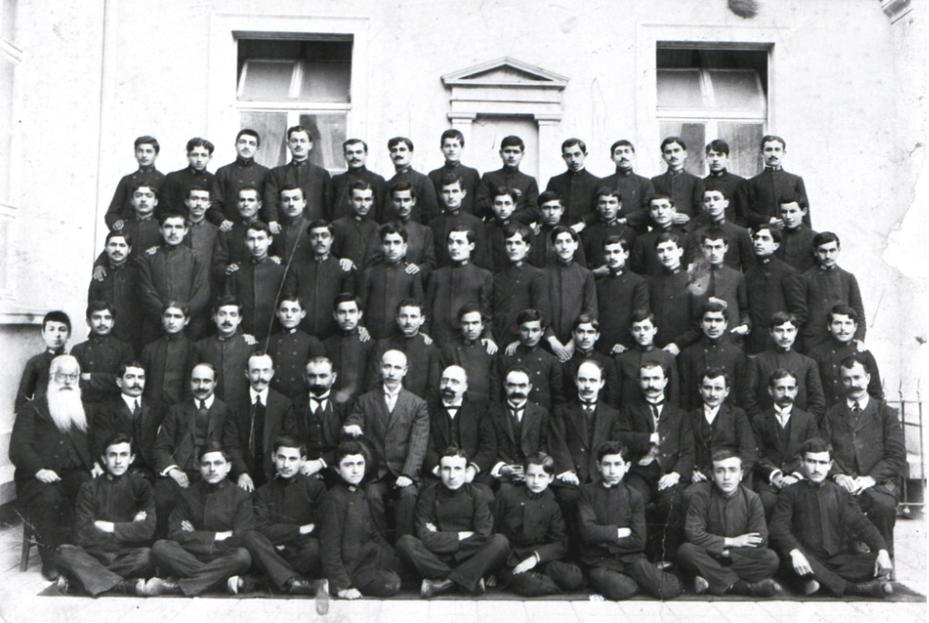
Pontic Greeks students and teachers in front of the school building

In 1817, Savvas Triantafyllidis became director of the Phrontisterion and the institution reached a higher level of educational standards as a result of the modern Greek Enlightenment. After 1839, and especially 1856, the Ottoman authorities allowed teachers that were trained in Athens, Greece to teach at the Phronstisterion. One of them, Periklis Triantafyllidis, the son of Savvas, taught classical philosophy and also recorded the local Greek dialect, Pontic Greek.

In 1902 the Phrontisterion was re-housed in a new, imposing building, which remains today as the most impressive Pontic Greek monument in Trabzon. It was a three-story building consisting of 36 classrooms, standing above the sea shore corniche of the city near the now destroyed Greek Orthodox Church of Gregory of Nyssa and the Armenian Cathedral. The school closed in November 1921, during the Greco-Turkish War (1919-1922), while the following years the local Greek communities left the region as part of the population exchange between Greece and Turkey. Today the building houses a Turkish school, the Kanuni Anadolu Lisesi.

== Sources ==
- Bryer, Anthony; Winfield, David (2006). The post-Byzantine monuments of Pontos. Ashgate. ISBN 978-0-86078-864-5.
