= Saint Anne Church, Trabzon =

Church in Trabzon, Turkey

Coordinates: 41°00′22″N 39°43′24″E

Church of Saint Anne
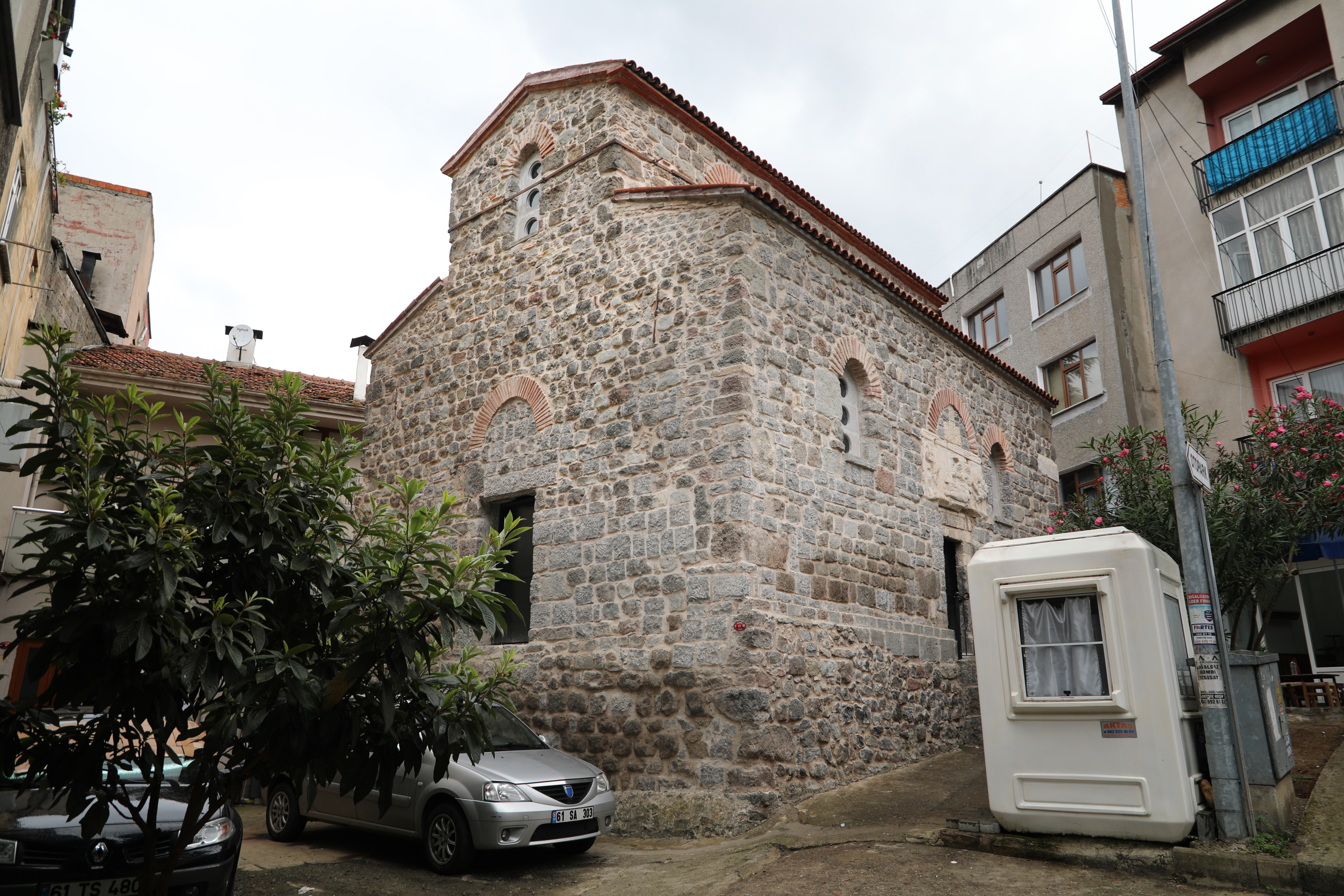
- Exterior view of the church

- Location within Turkey

Religion
- Affiliation: Greek Orthodox Church
- Rite: Byzantine Rite
- Status: Publicly accessible landmark

Location
- Location: Trebizond, Turkey

Architecture
- Type: Monastery
- Groundbreaking: 6th century AD
- Completed: 7th century AD

The Church of Saint Anne (Greek: Ἁγία Άννα, Turkish: Küçük Ayvasıl Kilisesi) is thought to be the oldest church in Trabzon city, Turkey, dating to the 6th or 7th century. It has not seen service in over a century, but has recently (2021–22) been thoroughly restored. With whitewash removed, all remaining frescos have now become visible. The church is accessible to the public free of charge during daytime hours.

== Architecture ==
The building is a small, early Byzantine-style structure, with a barrel vaulted nave and aisles, and a sanctuary flanked by side-chamber formed from three curved apses. Spolia is used in the building, with a classical sarcophagus used to form a tympanum over the main entrance door, showing a standing warrior and a winged Nike.

It is possible the church was built around the 6th or 7th centuries AD. On a relief slab above the south door there is an inscription stating that St. Anne was restored during the joint reigns of Basil I, Leo VI and Alexander in 884/85.

In 2021/22 the church was restored. Its exterior and interior cleaned. All whitewash was removed, making previously hidden frescoes visible.
