= Pontic Greek culture =

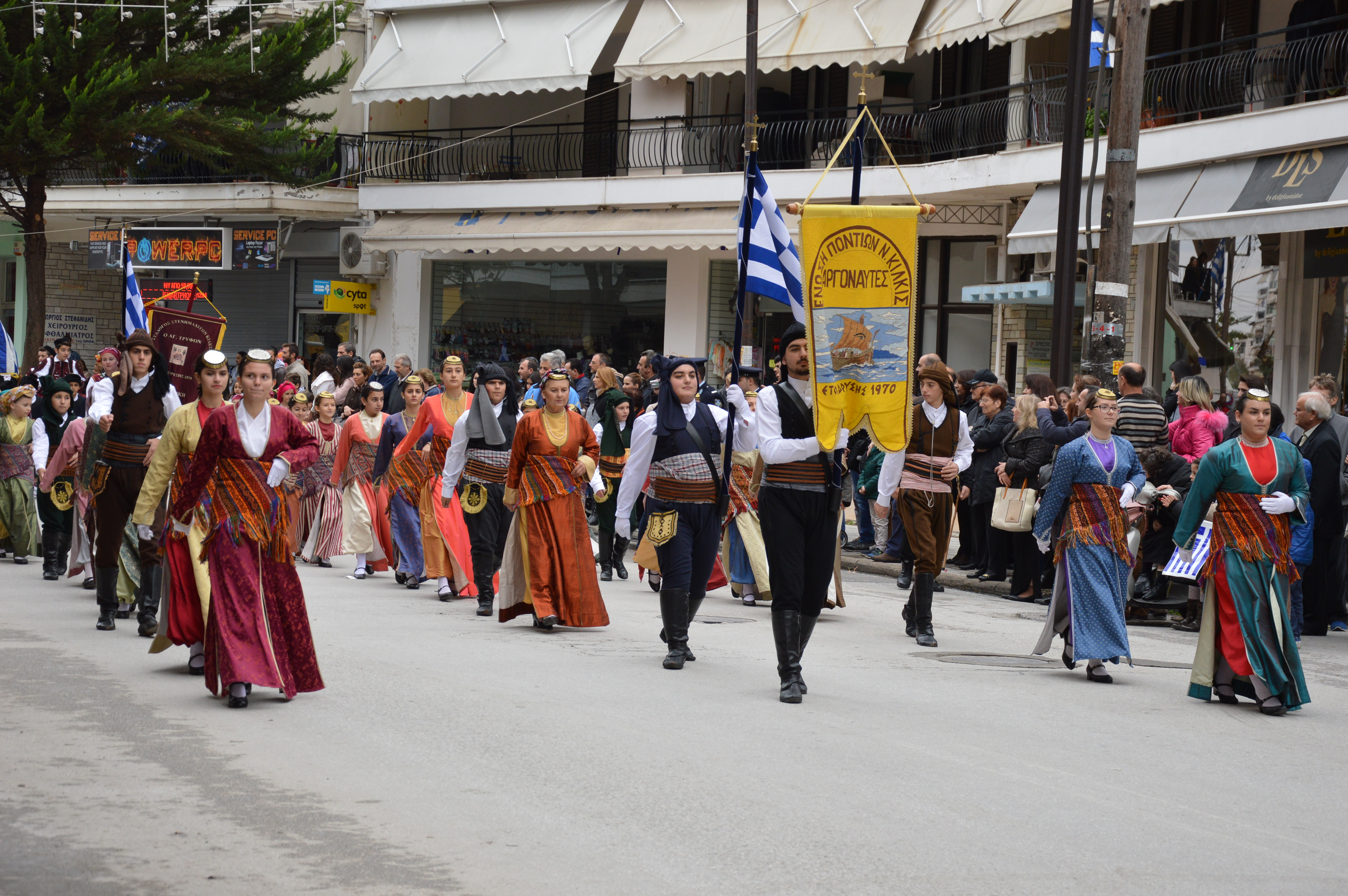
Members of a Pontian cultural group march during a parade in Greece.

Pontic Greek culture includes the traditional music, dance, architecture, clothing, artwork, and religious practices of the Pontic Greeks, also called Pontian Greeks (Pontic: Ῥωμαῖοι, romanized: Romaioi). (Note: Literally meaning "Romans") Pontians are an ethnic group indigenous to the Pontos in modern-day Turkey. They have lived in the area for thousands of years, since the 8th century BCE. The majority were displaced in the early 20th century CE after the Greek genocide and the population exchange between Greece and Turkey; most Pontians today live in the diaspora. Small pockets of Muslim Pontian communities remain in Turkey. Although Pontians speak many different languages, the Pontic Greek language, Romeika, is especially important to their culture. Most religious Pontian Greeks practice Greek Orthodoxy, but a minority adhere to Sunni Islam or other Christian denominations. Folk dances such as the serra, traditional music instruments such as the Pontic lyra, religious celebrations, traditional clothing, and the land itself remain important to Pontian diaspora communities.

Although their culture has been heavily influenced by Greek culture, Turkish culture, and the cultures of various minorities in Turkey such as Armenians and Lazes, Pontian culture contains unique aspects. The dominant culture of the countries where Pontians live has continued to shape Pontian culture since the formation of the diaspora. For example, many Pontians in Greece only speak Greek instead of Romeika, while Soviet Greeks (Note: Many now live in Greece; see Deportation of the Soviet Greeks) have adopted Russian and Ukrainian dishes into their cooking. Pontian cultural societies around the world aim to preserve and transmit Pontian traditions, especially folk dances.

== Pontos ==
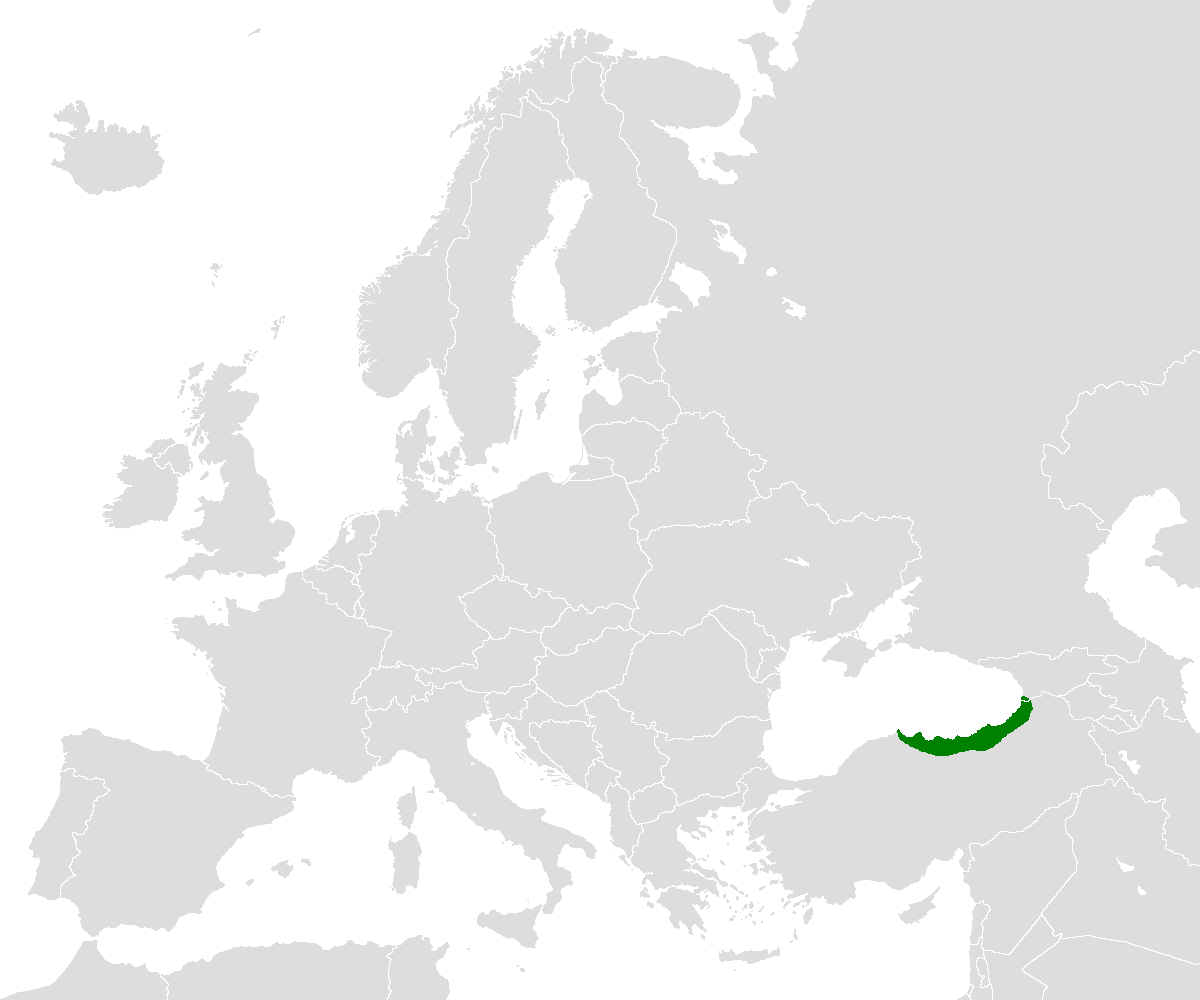
Pontos on a map of Europe

Pontos (Romeika: Bondon) is a historical region in what is now northeastern Turkey and southern coastal Georgia. It overlaps with Turkey's Black Sea Region, Western Armenia, and Lazica. This is the area where Romeika is traditionally spoken, along with Laz, Armenian, and more recently Turkish since the 1200s; it is also the Pontic Greek homeland. The area was originally inhabited by Ancient Anatolian peoples during the Bronze Age. Greeks from Ionia, the Aegean coast of Anatolia, began to colonize the Pontic coast in the 700s BCE.

To the north of the region is the Black Sea; the Pontic Alps form a rough southern border. Most of the area is forested, being part of the Euxine–Colchic deciduous forests. Large cities in the region which historically had large Pontic Greek populations include Sinope, Trapezounta, Kotyora, Kerasunda, Sampsunta, and Rizunda along the coast. Cities further inland include Gümüşhane, (Note: Sometimes called Argyropoulis in Greek and Romeika) Amasya, and Niksar. Agricultural products include nuts, vegetables, and fruits along the coast; grain in the valleys of the Pontic Alps; and livestock in the mountains and valleys. Fish is also plentiful along the coast.

Many different civilizations and empires have existed in the region. The Kingdom of Pontus and Empire of Trebizond both had territories that largely overlapped with Pontos. The region has been colonized by many different peoples, including the Greeks, Persians, Romans, and Turks. Toward the end of WWI, some notable Pontians, including Chrysanthos, advocated for an independent Pontic state at the Paris Peace Conference. This proposed state was called the Republic of Pontus.

The region's geography has historically isolated Pontians from other cultures. Remote mountain villages were often isolated from one another as well, leading to differences in language and culture from area to area. The culture of coastal cities was very different from that of rural mountain villages.

The region and its history are important to Pontian identity. Scholar Patricia Fann Bouteneff writes, "[Pontians] define themselves by their ancestors' place of birth and see themselves and their history as originating within the physical bounds of the Pontos." Pontian songs and literature tend to focus on the region, depicting it with nostalgia.

== Language ==
=== Name and status ===
Pontians traditionally speak Romeika, known in English as Pontic Greek. Pontians in Greece might call their dialect Pontiaka to highlight their Pontic identity. Due to extended contact with the Laz language, some speakers even refer to their dialect as Lazika. In Turkey, Romeika is often called Rumca. Although Romeika is, linguistically, a variety of modern Greek, it is not mutually intelligible with other Greek varieties, such as Demotic Greek. (Note: Demotic Greek is the dominant spoken language of Greece, often referred to as Standard Modern Greek or merely Greek.) For this reason, some scholars view Romeika as its own Hellenic language. Other researchers recognize it as a dialect, but one that is incredibly far removed from other Greek varieties. British archaeologist Richard MacGillivray Dawkins said, "The position of Pontic is at the end of a long chain of [Greek] dialects, though it is the last link which has very nearly entirely detached itself."

Romeika, like all other modern Greek varieties except for Tsakonian, is descended from ancient Attic-Ionic Greek. Beginning in the 11th century, dialects of medieval Greek began to diverge from one another. Romeika is also very distinct from other varieties because the Pontos has historically been isolated from other parts of the Greek-speaking world. Other languages, such as Laz, Turkish, Armenian, Kurdish, and Russian, have influenced Romeika. Many loanwords feature in Romeika vocabulary.

Romeika differs from region to region. The dialect of the coast differs from the dialect of rural mountain communities. However, there are also many differences from village to village. The dialects from Of and Çaykara are also markedly different from other Pontic Greek varieties. The variety of Romeika spoken in Georgia is also distinct. The modern Romeika spoken by Pontians living in Greece is mostly based on the dialect spoken in Chaldia (Gümüşhane and southern Trapezounta).

=== Endangerment of Romeika ===
Romeika is an endangered language. According to Ethnologue, 778,000 spoke Romeika as of 2015. 400,000 of these speakers lived in Greece. Some small rural communities in Turkey still speak the Ophitic dialect of Romeika (Oflidika). (Note: Speakers of the Ophitic dialect call their language Romeika, like speakers of other Pontic Greek varieties. This may cause readers to confuse Ophitic with other varieties of Pontic Greek. In English literature, the Ophitic dialect is sometimes stylized as Romeyka.) Only 4,000-8,000 people still speak Ophitic. Most speakers are older; very few children speak it. Ophitic is the last Greek variety spoken in eastern Turkey in the 21st century. Some Ophitic speakers live outside of Turkey; enclaves exist in Cyprus.

Romeika faces many threats to its continued existence. Children do not learn Romeika in school; instead, they are taught in the language of the country (standard Greek, Turkish, Russian, etc.). In some cases, parents have been encouraged not to speak to their children in Romeika to facilitate the children's understanding of the dominant language. Pontian children growing up in Greece in the mid-20th century report being beaten for speaking Romeika in schools.

In Greece and Turkey, Romeika is experiencing language attrition as speakers use the dominant language of the country—Greek and Turkish, respectively—more frequently and with greater ease than they use Romeika.

Some Pontian organizations, such as the Argonauti-Komninoi Pontic Greek Association in Greece, aim to teach Romeika so as to preserve the language.

=== Grammar and vocabulary ===
Romeika is of interest to linguists because it contains many archaisms reminiscent of Ancient Greek varieties. The Ophitic dialect (Oflidika), which has been heavily researched by linguist Ioanna Sitaridou, contains archaisms found in no other form or variety of Greek. However, Romeika is a modern, living language distinct from ancient Koine Greek.

Romeika has many differences from standard modern Greek. Romeika differs from standard Greek in vocabulary, grammar, and syntax. For example, in Romeika, as in English, it is possible to collapse the sentence "I'll go and see" into "I'll go see." In standard Greek, one must say "I'll go and see." Romeika also has discourse markers such as kja and ja; standard Greek lacks discourse markers.

Romeika also features sounds which are not present in standard Greek. For example, Romeika has the sound "sh" (IPA: [ ʃ ]), while standard Greek does not. One Romeika word with this sound is ra'shopon (small crest). To accommodate for these differences, Romeika may be written using a modified Greek alphabet.

Romeika has six vowels and nineteen consonants; some of the vowels only appear in Turkish loanwords. The language has three grammatical genders: feminine, masculine, and neuter. The gender of the noun does not always have to agree with the gender of the adjective; feminine nouns may have feminine or neuter adjectives. Grammatical cases include accusative, genitive, nominative, and vocative. Romeika is left-branching, similar to nearby Laz and Turkish. Verbs are conjugated in the present, imperfect, and aorist tenses. The imperfect and aorist both describe events in the past. Animacy is also an important feature of nouns in Romeika.

Examples of vocabulary differences between Romeika and Greek
| English | Romeika | Greek |
|---|---|---|
| grandmother | kalomána, kalimána, kalýma | giagiá |
| carcass | lásha | koufári |
| I forget | anaspalo | xéchasa |

=== Cultural role ===
Traditionally, Romeika was not used in schools, churches, or written records. Standard Greek was used instead. Romeika was spoken at home. As such, there is a paucity of historical writing in Romeika. The Greek publisher Αρχειον Ποντου (Pontic Archive) has published texts in Romeika since 1928. Few novels have been published in Romeika. Zerzelidis wrote a few novels in Romeika in the mid-20th century, and playwright Polykarpos Haitas wrote his autobiography in the language.

A Romeika translation of the Asterix comic series was published in 2000. One translator, Anatoli Karipidou, has translated the Iliad, the Odyssey, and children's stories into Romeika. She also teaches Romeika.

For Pontians living in the diaspora, Romeika is an important marker of uniqueness, separating them out from the dominant culture. Pontians use their language to preserve an ethnic identity and distinguish themselves from others.

== Cuisine ==
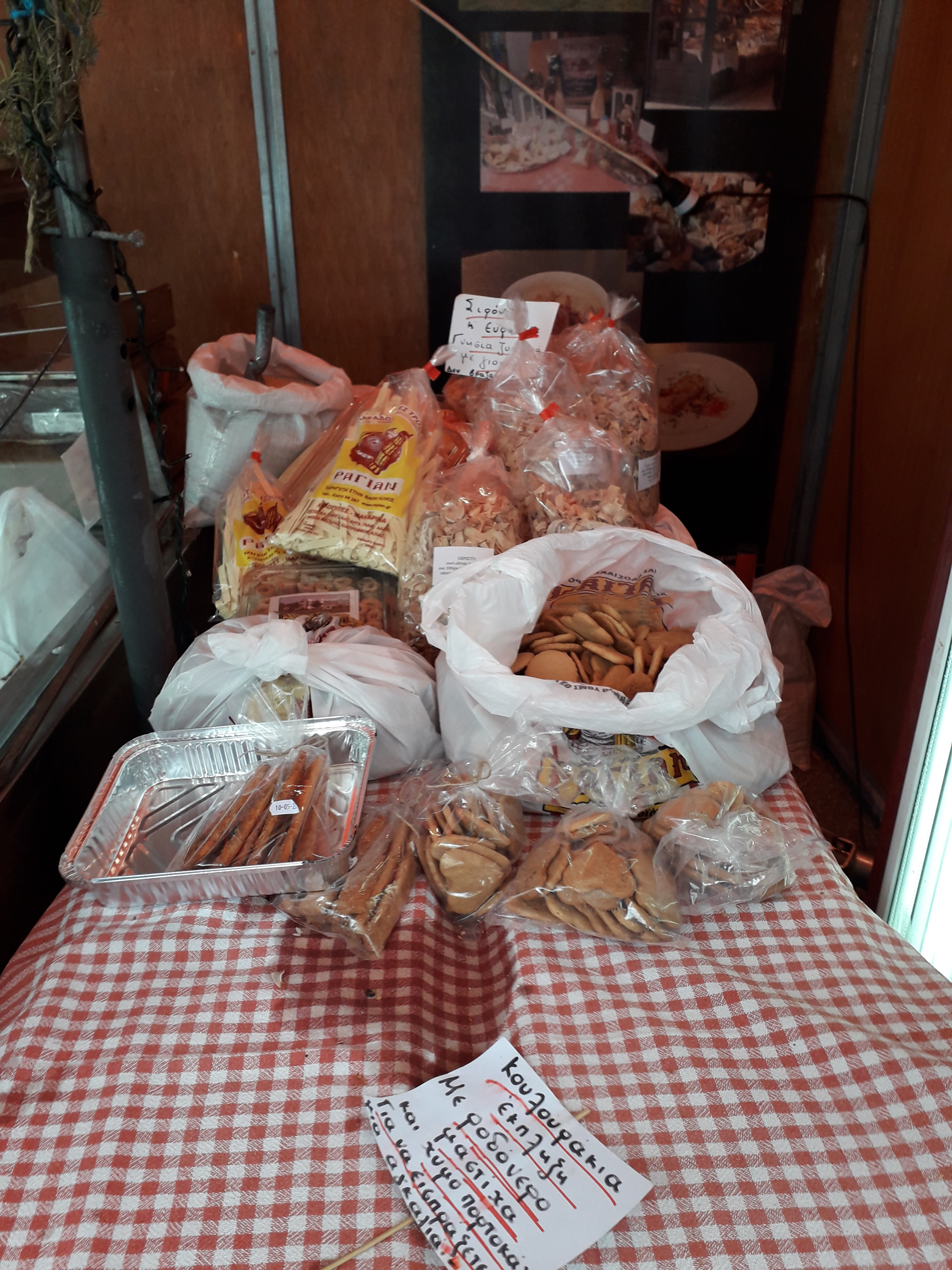
Koulourakia and traditional Pontic noodles for sale at a food stall in Athens

Pontian cuisine, which evolved separately from Greece for thousands of years, has many differences from Greek cuisine. It shares many similarities with Laz, Hemshin, Armenian, and Turkish cuisine. Owing to the large Pontic Greek community in the former Soviet Union, (Note: See Greeks in Russia) modern Pontian cuisine also incorporates aspects of Russian cuisine and Ukrainian cuisine.

Pontians traditionally employed both agriculture and foraging. Women are the primary foragers, although men might also forage for food. Some Pontians, especially older people living in rural areas, still forage in the 21st century. Pontians also practiced transhumance. During the winter months, many rural Pontian farmers stayed in villages at lower altitudes called cheimadia. During the summer months, they traveled to high-altitude pastures called parcharia and let their animals graze. (Note: Same as yayla in Turkish.) The pastures often had houses and churches which might be covered in snow for most of the year. However, the winter villages were not abandoned during the summer, and some people went between their villages and pastures even during the summers.

Grains, dairy products, vegetables, seafood, and meat are all integral to Pontian cuisine. Milk, cheese, and yogurt are important dairy products. Grains include rice, oats, and wheat. The majority of Pontians, up until the creation of the diaspora, were farmers who produced their own food. They ate whatever was available. The Pontos has a distinct winter and summer; Pontians enjoyed different seasonal crops and stored fruit, fish, cured meat, cheese, and dried pasta for the winter.

Traditional cooking implements include the satz, a convex metal pan for cooking flatbreads over open fire, the shahan (Turkish Wikipedia: sahan), and many others.

=== Dishes ===
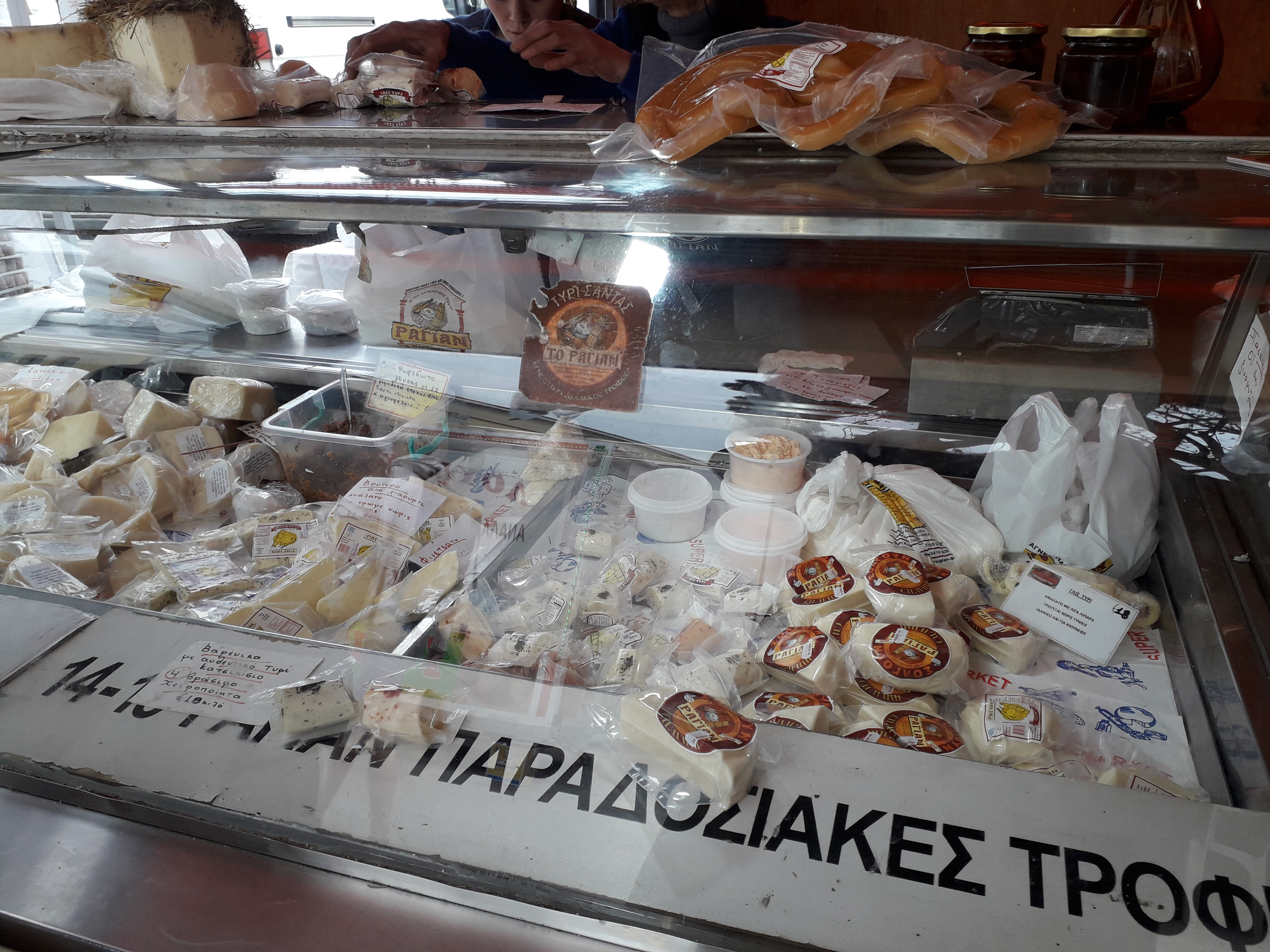
Food stall displaying a variety of Pontic Greek cheeses including gais and goat cheeses

Pontians have a number of traditional breakfast dishes: foustoron (similar to an omelette), lalánggia, havitz, and more. Breakfast dishes typically include eggs, bread, or porridge.

For lunch and dinner, Pontians traditionally eat a number of soups, savory pies, rice pilav, pasta dishes, flatbreads, and dumplings. Some soups include kintéata, a type of nettle soup; cabbage soup; and malez, a grain soup. Pilav dishes include rice and a variety of meats, including chicken, anchovies, and mussels. Some pilav varieties include wild greens and nuts. Pasta dishes are less common and include siron, a type of pasta made of phyllo dough. Savory pies include perek, made with layers of phyllo dough and cheese filling. Another, diamesia, has a vegetable filling. Meat dishes include kebabs, kioftedes (meatballs), and peynirli. They also traditionally make dolmades, which may or may have a meat or vegetarian filling. Dumplings include varénika, mantía, peréskia, and chebureki, all dumplings with meat, cheese, or vegetable fillings. Vegetable dishes include pickled, slow-cooked, sautéed, and stuffed vegetables. They also use a variety of condiments like adjika and tsatsoupel, which are vegetable-based, and paskitan, which is yogurt-based.

Some sweets, like tsirichtá (lokma) and otía, are made of fried dough. Others, like tsorek' pourma and sousamópita, are baked in the oven.

Yogurt forms the basis for many traditional Pontian dishes, including soups and tan, a fermented drink. Pontians also traditionally drink tea and coffee.

Special foods are traditionally prepared for holidays, weddings, and funerals. For example, kollyva is traditionally eaten at funerals and memorial services.

== Dance ==
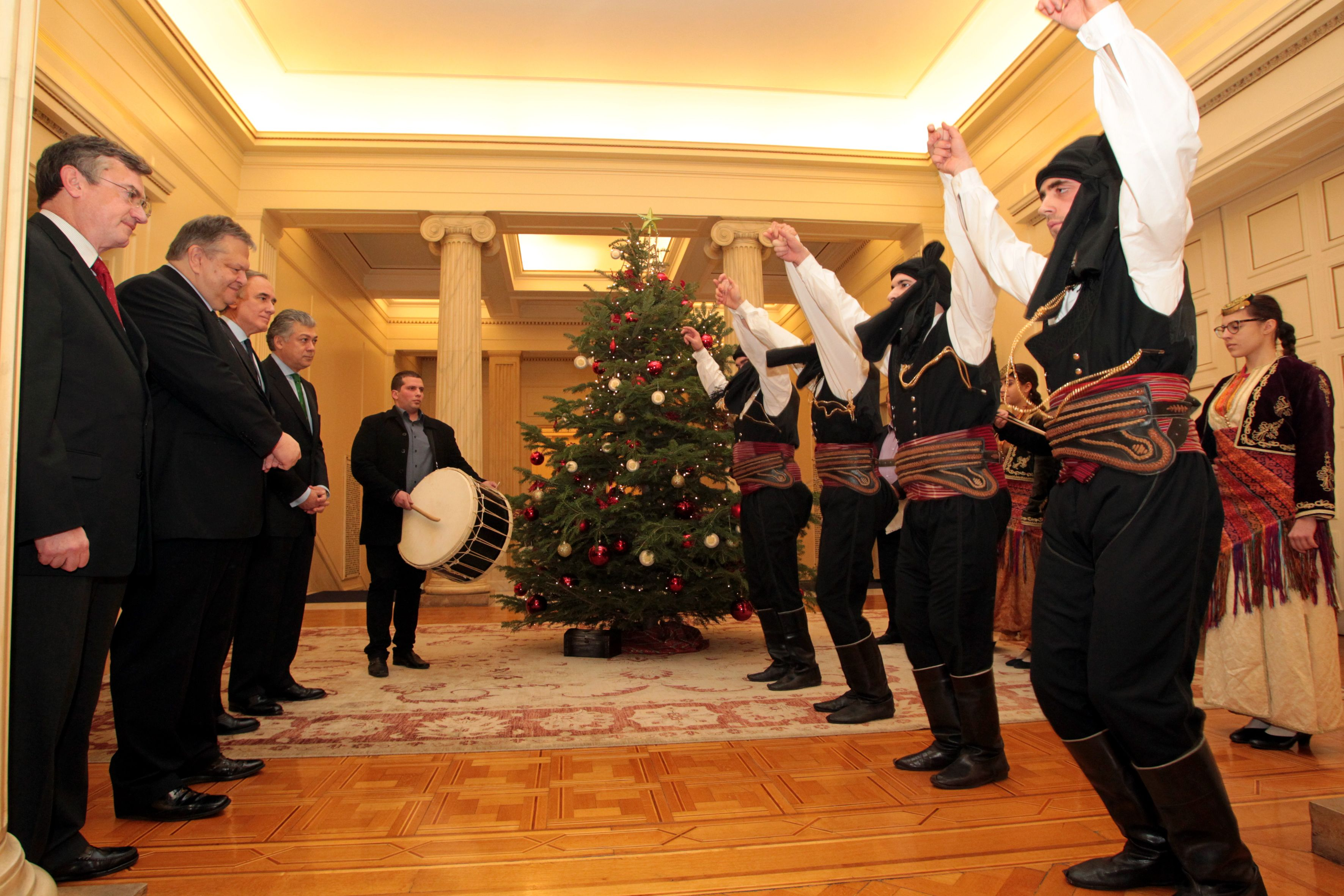
Pontians performing a dance, probably serra, during a Christmas celebration at the Ministry of Foreign Affairs in Greece

Dance has been a central element of Pontian culture since ancient times. Some modern Pontian dances can be traced back to Ancient Greek dances. For example, the serra is related to the ancient pyrrhichios, a war dance. Pontian dance has evolved over the centuries. Other traditions in the region, such as Armenian, Turkish, and Laz dances, have influenced Pontian Greek dance.

Dance serves an important cultural role. Pontians dance at almost all major events: dinners, weddings, birthdays, wedding receptions, religious festivals, Greek festivals, and commemorative events.

Pontian dance is a distinct style characterized by "nervous energy", trembling of the shoulders and torso, knee bends, arm swings, and small, precise steps. Dances are always performed in groups. Although some paired dances exist, line dances and circle dances make up the majority of the Pontian repertoire. Dances are accompanied by traditional Pontic Greek music. Some dances are only performed by women, others only by men; many are mixed dances.

In the diaspora, performances of Pontian dance allow Pontians to experience a sense of group and cultural identity. Many Pontian dance clubs exist for this same reason. Anthropologist Valerie Liddle argues that Pontians also dance to commemorate their former home in Pontos. Some dances were lost because the people who practiced them were killed during the Greek genocide.

Dances vary from region to region. For example, there are a variety of tik dances from various cities and regions in Pontos. Dances may be performed in even or odd meters. Dancers typically link hands or rest their arms on each other's shoulders while in a line or circle dance. The tempo may be slow or energetic. For example, the dance varyn tik from Akdağmadeni is relatively slow, while the tria ti kotsari (Note: Kotsari variant) is fast-paced and energetic.

There are some different classes of Pontian dance. The tik dances are performed by mixed groups. Tik means "brave" or "upright". Omal ("smooth, regular") is another class of mixed dances; they have simple steps. There are also many war dances, related to the serra, also called the horon in Turkish. These are typically male dances, although women also perform them in some regions. Other war dances include the syrtos and atsiapat. Still others include the kotsari, which is shared with Armenians; karsilamas, letsina, and podaraki.

== Music ==
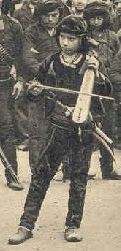
Boy in Trapezounta playing the lyra, on a 1910 postcard

The Pontian musical tradition is centuries old. It is closely associated with Pontic Greek dance, as music typically accompanies the dances. Pontian music has been influenced by various musical traditions in the Pontos region, especially Laz music. Pontian music typically incorporates polyphony; multiple independent melodies overlap each other at the same time. Music is structured in hexachords and usually has a rapid tempo.

Traditional instruments include the lyra, daouli, touloum, dankiyo, oud, and zurna. The lyra, or Black Sea kemençe, is a three-stringed instrument in the lute family. It has an important role in Pontian cultural heritage; many Pontian organizations abroad feature the lyra as part of their logo. The lyra is also an important part of traditional Laz and Turkish music.

The singing employs heavy use of vibrato as well as call-and-response, usually with a lead singer and a chorus. Some songs are performed as duets between a woman and a man.

Some of the oldest known songs in Romeika are Acritic songs. This genre of music focuses on Byzantine soldiers who defended the borders from invaders. Not all Acritic songs are in Romeika, but some are, such as T'íl' to kástron ("The castle of the sun") and Aitén'ts eperipétanen ("An eagle flew high"). Romeika-language Acritic songs tend to focus on warfare, conquest, and folk heroes.

Many folk songs also emerged during Ottoman times. Subjects included romantic love, historical events, fantastic situations, and war. Two Pontian love songs are Serranda mila kokkina ("Forty red apples") and Kortsopon lal'me ("Girl, call me"). Both are traditionally duets between a female and male singer. One song focusing on historical events is Τσιάμπασιν, romanized as Tsambasin, which discusses a fire in the town of Çambaşı, Çaykara. Folk songs served as entertainment and ways to tell stories. There were also songs for certain situations and times, such as wedding songs and mirologoi (mourning songs).

Other songs emerged in the early 1900s in response to the Greek genocide and the Greek-Turkish population exchange. Some examples are Tim batrída'm éxasa ("I lost my homeland"), written by Kostas Siamidis and Christos Antoniadis, and Palikária a son Pónton ("Courageous men from Pontos"), which discusses legendary folk heroes who fought against the çetes.

Musicians, both Pontian Greek and Turkish, continue to create new songs in Romeika. For example, Giannis Vasiliadis, who comes from a Soviet Greek family, wrote the song "Kavkaz" in Romeika. Apolas Lermi, a singer and guitarist from Trapezounta, has released two albums with Romeika-language songs: "Kalandar" in 2011, and "Romeika" in 2016. Merve Tanrıkulu, a Turkish singer from Trapezounta, released an original Romeika-language song in 2019 called Romeika ninni ("Romeika lullaby").

Some Pontians in the diaspora also participate in parakathi singing, where two singers exchange couplets in Romeika. The couplets may be original or traditional. The exchange may be a form of banter, grief, lighthearted argument, or flirting.

== Clothing ==
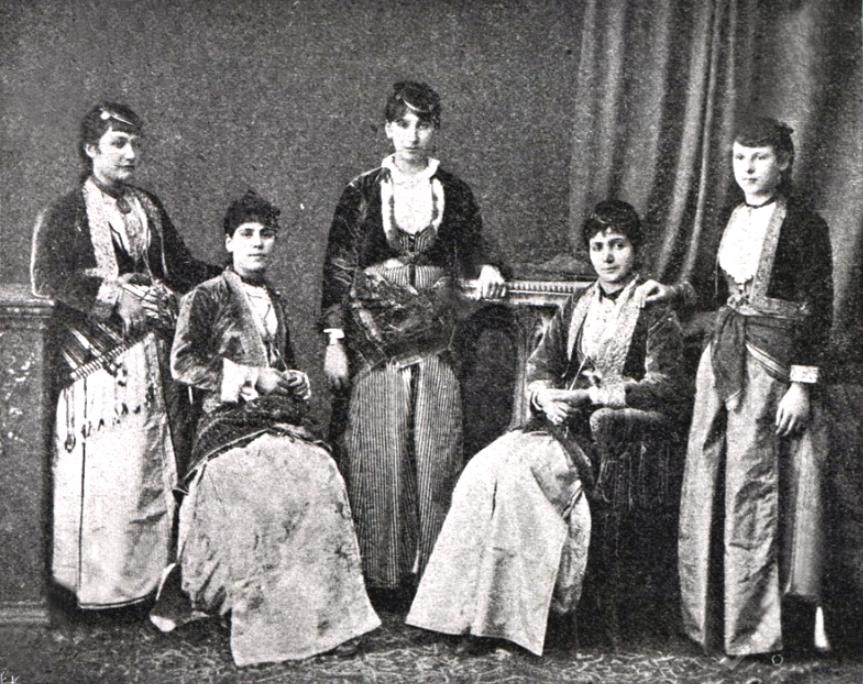
Pontian women in traditional clothes, early 1900s Trapezounta

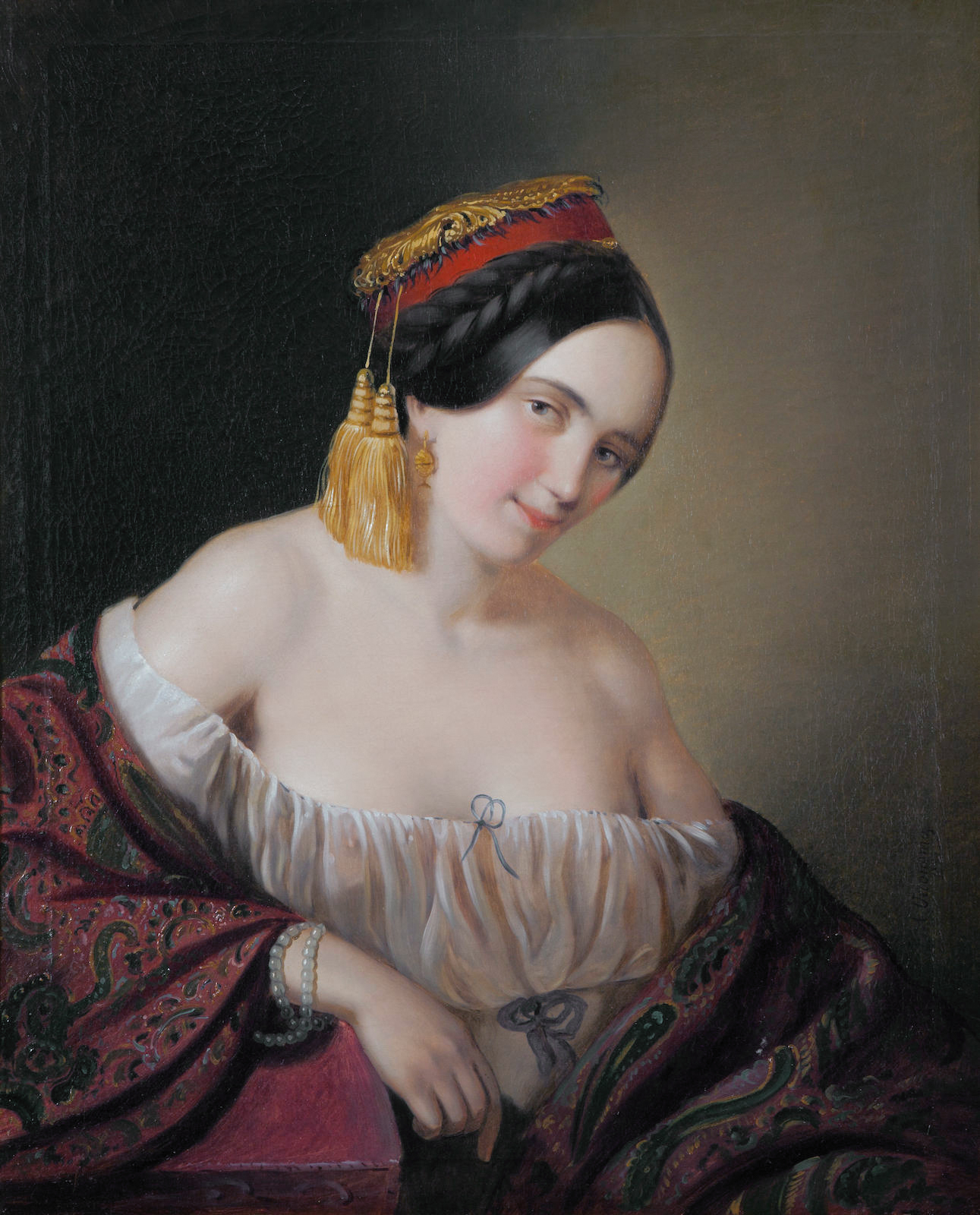
An aristocratic lady dressed in a traditional costume from Pontus, 1859 painting by Aristide Oeconomo, depicts the painter's perception of Pontian clothing.

Much like Pontian cuisine, folktales, language, and dance, Pontian clothing traditionally varied from region to region. Matzouka and Santa in particular had unique clothing traditions. In the modern day, Pontian folk clothing is typically worn at dances and cultural festivals. The modern Pontian folk costume is an amalgamation of different local clothing traditions based on photographs and surviving garments. This section focuses on early modern Pontian clothing worn in the 1800s and early 1900s.

Traditionally, most clothing was made in the home; this includes weaving fabric, dyeing fabric, and actually sewing clothes. Tailors made some clothes, including formal wear, jackets, and overcoats. Pontian tailors often made clothes for Muslims in their communities as well. Milliners (kalpakzides) made headwear.

Clothes were subject to some superstition. If a person was sick or injured, their clothing may have been hung in a churchyard to aid in their recovery.

=== Women's clothing ===
Underwear included vrakin, white calico or linen underpants which reached the knee. These were typically embroidered. They also wore kamis, a linen or cotton undershirt, with a band to support the breasts. Kamis for special occasions were made of silk in Bursa or Trapezounta. On top of the kamis, women in some areas might wear a sparel, which is like the front of a shirt and ties around the neck. Everyday sparel were plain cotton, while festive ones were made of silk, satin, or velvet. They wore shalwar of cotton or wool. Festive shalwar were satin or taffeta. The main focus of a woman's outfit was her zoupouna, a dress-like garment of wool or cotton for daily use. It is similar to the dalmatica, a feature of Byzantine dress. The zoupouna buttons in the front. At around age 15, girls began wearing the zoupouna. It is open in the front to show the sparel or kamis. It is also open at the sides to show the shalwar. The zoupouna often had decorative prints or embroidery. Women also typically wore a short embroidered felt overcoat. They also wore a thick woven waistband of local or imported fabric. Like the male waistband, it was typically colorful with stripes or other designs. They wore wool-lined overcoats in the winter. Women typically wore socks or embroidered slippers in the hose. Outside of the house, women wore leather shoes with a low heel, called postala; moccasins, or clogs. In rainy weather, women and men wore hard leather kaloshia over their regular shoes.

The everyday cotton waistband was called a zonar, typically of local wool or Crimean cotton. Festive waistbands were edjemshalin, made of colorful woven fabric from Iran; lahor zonar of fine wool woven in Lahore, Pakistan; square, tasseled tarapouloz of silk from Tripoli, Libya; and white silk bridal zonar.

Women typically wore their hair in braids. In some regions, one braid was typical, while in Livera (Note: A Pontian village near Matzouka, today called Yazlık, Maçka) they wore four braids. Beginning at age 16, young women wore small, disc-shaped hats. The tapla was decorated with gold coins, while the tepelik had an embossed gold or silver plate or coins on top, while the koursin had golden thread and a golden tassel. All of these styles were tied behind the woman's braid with a ribbon. At this age, young women also began to cover their heads with a light-colored kerchief or headscarf. On festive occasions, they may not have worn headcoverings. Older women wore headscarves in dark colors.

After having children, women began to wear a wool, felt, or cotton apron over their zoupouna. Older women also wore a fur-lined felt overcoat. Older women wore a fez covered with kerchiefs, which they may have let hang around their chest.

Women of means ornamented themselves with plentiful jewelry (kosmima) made from silver and gold. They wore earrings, pocket watches, rings, bracelets, large chain necklaces, and chains affixed to the hair called tetikia. A gerdanluk was made of many chains, beads, and coins and affixed around the neck like a collar. A kustin was a similar piece of jewelry with coins sewn onto a piece of fabric and tied around the neck. In urban areas, women wore necklaces with hearts or crosses.

=== Men's clothing ===
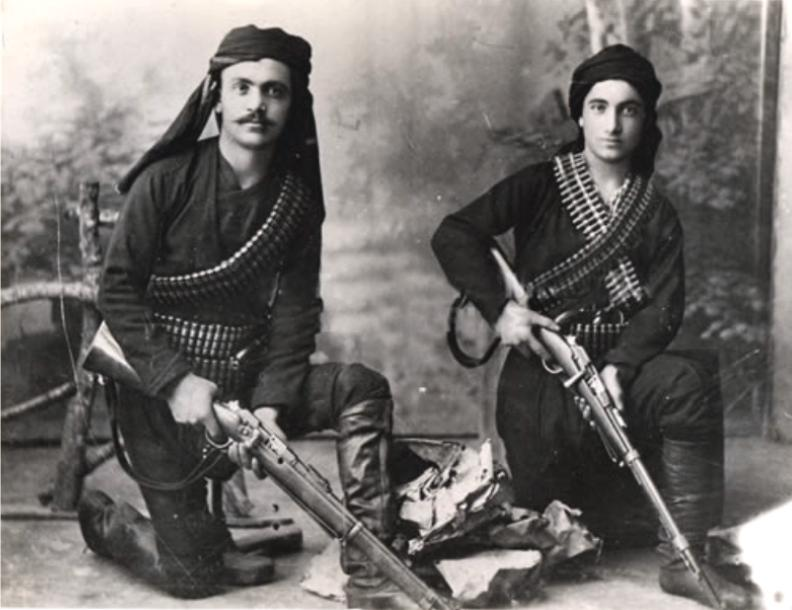
Pontian men in zipka, early 1900s.

A man's costume traditionally consists of a linen or cotton shirt (kamis), shalwar, (Note: Young men wore cotton shalwar of navy blue or black, while older men wore shalwar of wool or felt.) and an overcoat, either short or long. Overcoats may have been lined with fur, depending on the season. Men also wore a type of crossed vest called either ghelek or Tzamntan. The latter had two rows of buttons. The male zoupouna was worn either open or buckled like a waistcoat. Farmers wore leather shoes called tsaroushia outside the home and slippers or socks in the home. Mestia were leather shoes for special occasions. In rainy weather, women and men wore kaloshia over their regular shoes.

Beginning at age 6 to 8, boys began to wear the fez. Men might also wear a domed headdress of felt called a ketse. They also wore a woven waistband; the name varied based on its fabric and origin, and was similar to the female waistband. Colorful waistbands of imported fabrics were for special occasions; most men wore white cotton wasitbands for daily use. Men also wore rings on their fingers.

Beginning in the 1800s, Pontian men began to adopt the zipka, the traditional Laz costume. The zipka includes dark trousers of local or imported English wool (zipka), a white shirt (kamis), a vest (yelek), and an overcoat (kontes). The outfit also included a woven fabric belt, a leather belt on top, several silver chains, a pocketwatch, leather belts, and a large, embroidered tobacco pouch. The man also wore a pashlik, (Note: Also spelled paslik, pashlouk.) a black fabric headcovering which is tied around the head, somewhat similar to a keffiyeh. The zipka is associated with warfare; it typically included an ammo belt, a pouch for gunpowder, and sheaths for daggers. Male jewelry included multiple silver necklaces; each chain might have an amulet (filakto) or religious icon (engolpio).

Some Pontian men, especially city dwellers of the mercantile class, began to adopt European clothes (stana, tsatala). A man who wore European clothing was called a tsatalos. Men, more so than women, began to wear European clothing because they were more likely to work outside the home.

== Gender ==
Pontian Greek society is traditionally male-dominated. The home and village are traditionally the woman's sphere, while areas outside the village are the man's sphere.

The rugged mountain terrain of inland Pontos does not lend itself to year-round farming and cultivation. As such, many rural Pontians practiced transhumance, moving between summer pastures and winter villages. In rural villages, families also relied on the wages of emigrant workers, who found employment in other parts of the Ottoman Empire and Russia. These workers were usually men; they often spent a long portion of the year away from home. As such, women often maintained the households and villages.

Pontians traditionally practiced patrilocal marriage: a newly married woman went to live in her husband's family home. If a family had multiple married sons, there might be many families living in the same house. The mas or strimnoman tradition likely evolved to maintain a hierarchy within the household and to reduce discord. According to this tradition, a woman who married into the family was expected to keep completely silent, only communicating through gestures, until the family allowed her to speak. The tradition varied from region to region. In some areas, the new woman must keep silent until she bore a son. In others, she was expected to be silent for two years. Women without husbands had even less autonomy; widows were marginalized. Widows wore very plain, dark clothing and typically stayed indoors.

Patricia Fann Bouteneff, an academic who focuses on Pontian Greek culture and folklore, described the ideal Pontian wife: "She had a mouth, but she didn't have a voice." In folktales, Pontian women and girls are stereotyped as disloyal; they cuckold their husbands and betray their fathers.

Clothing was an important part of the bride's dowry. Married women could continue to wear their bridal costume at formal occasions until they had children. Pregnant women avoided going outside; when out of doors, they wore very loose, modest clothes to protect their pregnancy from the evil eye. After having children, women also began to wear less colorful clothing.

== Folktales ==
Pontian folktales fall into multiple categories. Fables are short stories with anthropomorphized characters used to teach a lesson. Simple tales, called mythoi, are similarly didactic. Longer, more complex tales typically exist for entertainment. Many are violent compared to other Greek folktales. One such violent tale is "The Girl Whose Teeth Looked Like Hatchets" (Romeika: To koritsi pou eiche dontia san skeparnia), told in Amasya. This story follows a young girl with teeth the size and shape of hatchets who indiscriminately kills and eats people. Other Pontian folktales are humorous, such as O pilitsánon ("The Short Man"), whose protagonist believes that his pocketwatch has come to life. The tale is from Gümüșhane.

Pontian folktales have much in common with other Greek folktales, European folktales, and folktales of the Middle East. Many date to antiquity and include Ancient Greek monsters such as the cyclops. Others have medieval origins and religious themes. Still others are more recent.

While English-language fairy tales often begin with the phrase "Once upon a time", Pontian folktales typically begin with "In the first times and in the silver years..." Clever, industrious, and morally upright characters are rewarded. The heroes of Pontian folktales are often socially disadvantaged: they may be very young, weak, or poor. Divine helpers appear in disguise, rewarding the righteous and punishing the immoral. Disguises are common; courageous heroines may disguise themselves as men to achieve their goals. In European folktales, great detail is given to the punishment of a villain. In Pontian folktales, on the other hand, villains are often left to be punished by God.

The tellers of tales are members of the community; Pontian communities did not have professional storytellers. People told folktales while doing work and at community gatherings. Tales were often told around the hearth at home. Families participated in parakath, where family and friends gathered in a house in the evening to eat and talk. Often, housewives told tales at these parakathi while preparing coffee and serving food for the guests. The narrator prefaced her story by saying, "Anyone who is inside, stay in; and whoever is outside, stay out; and whoever needs to piss, let him go piss and come back," according to Xenophon Akoglous, who wrote about the folklore of Kotyora in the 20th century.

Folktales told by women differ in many ways from them told by men. For example, female villains in stories told by women tend to be in-laws or witches; those in stories told by men tend to be direct female relatives or wives. Female narrators also tend to tell tales with female heroes, while male narrators tend to tell tales with male heroes. The heroines in women's folktales often struggle with going to live in their husbands' homes. They are more resourceful, morally righteous, and intelligent than heroines in men's folktales. Folktales often end in marriage celebrations. Also, folktales differ from region to region of Pontos. Those from Kotyora are typically elaborate and include more features of Middle Eastern folktales, while those from Santa are typically violent and give female characters greater equality with males. While most folktales are set in the Pontos, some are set in faraway locations such as England, Germany, and Austria.

Folktales were used to express beliefs about other ethnic groups and even teach these beliefs to children. One such tale is Xotlák ("Vampires") from Matzouka. According to superstition, an unbaptized person, especially a Turk, could turn into a xotlák (vampire) after their death. In this tale, a dead Turkish man climbed out of his grave and became a large dog. The dog followed a Pontian man all night; in the morning, the dog turned back into a human. The tale reflects biased beliefs against all Muslims, but especially Turks.

While some folktales exist to teach a moral lesson, some exist to teach other lessons. For example, the Pontian version of "The Twelve Months" can teach children the names of the months in Romeika.

Muslim speakers of Romeika do not typically tell Pontian folktales. Instead, they tell Turkish folktales, such as stories of Nasreddin Hodja.

== Architecture ==
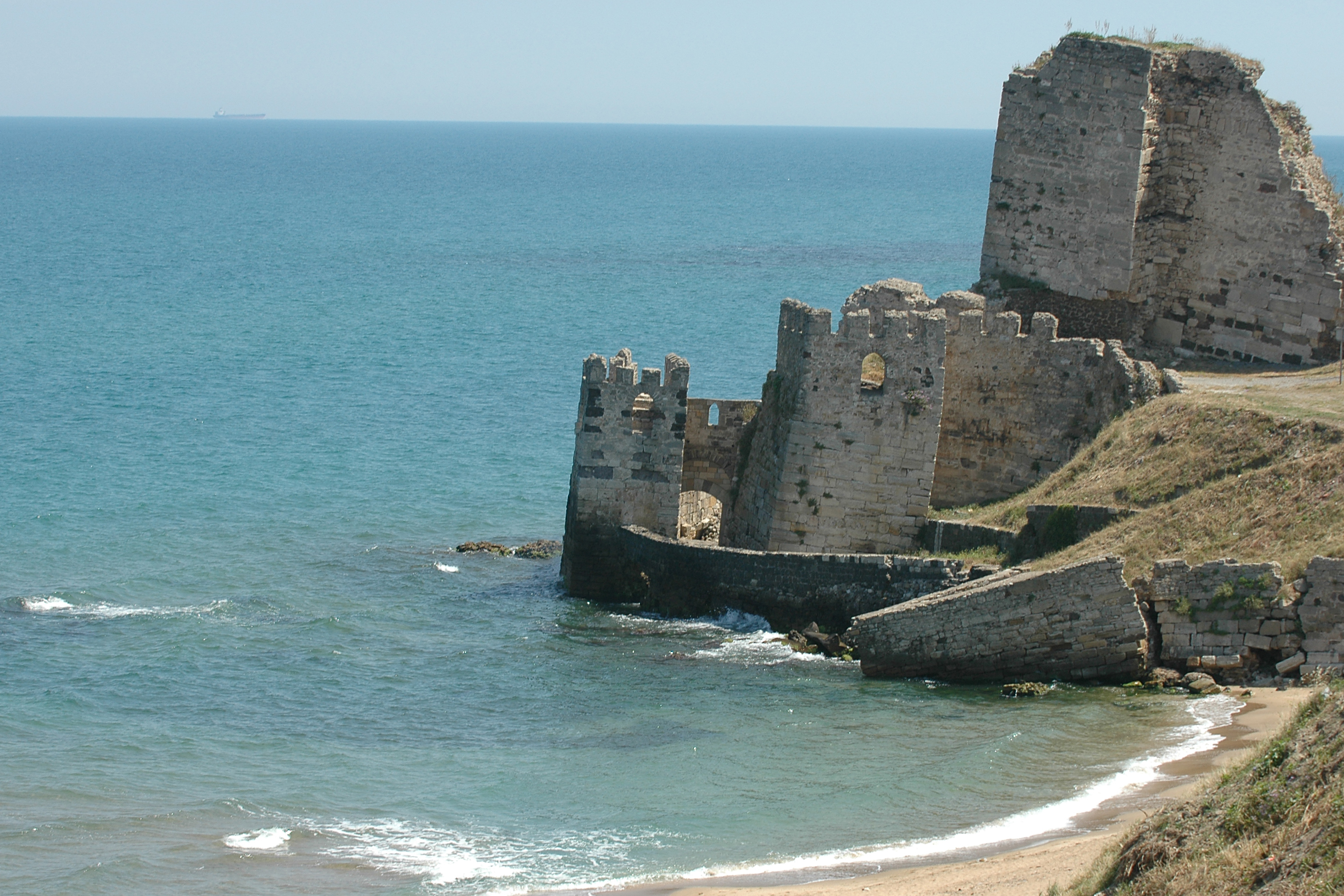
Remains of Sinope Fortress

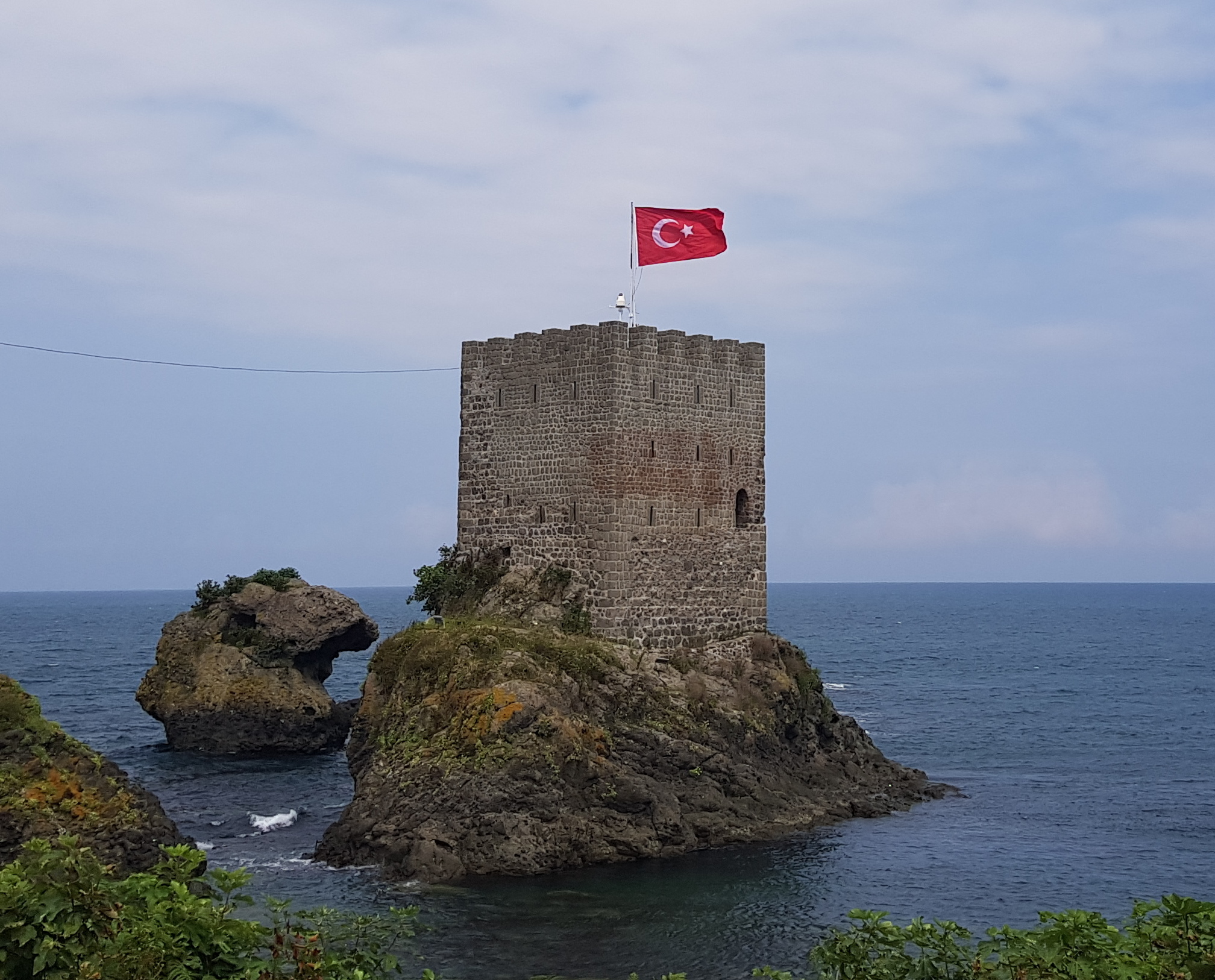
Offshore castle in Rize

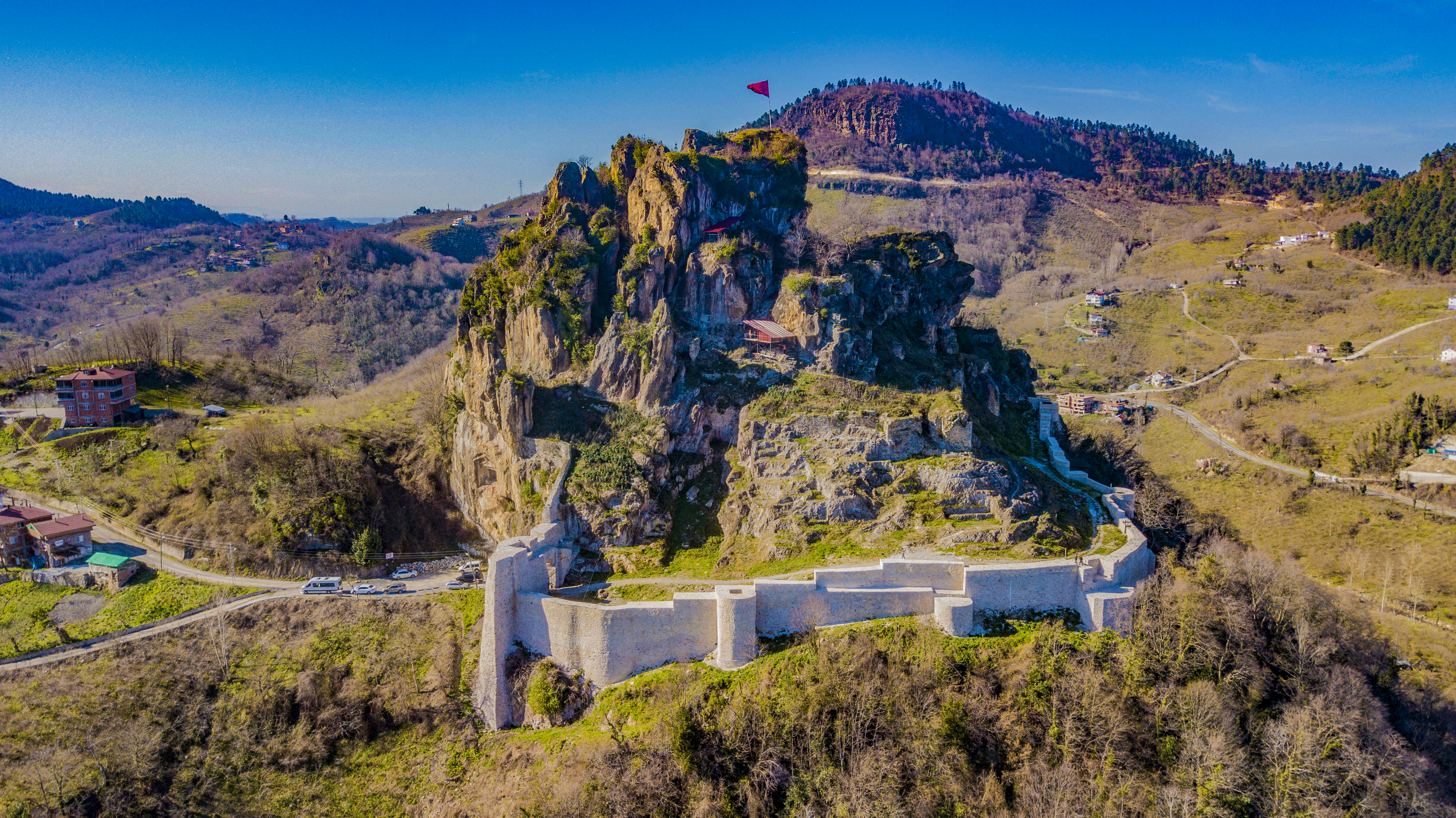
Oinaion Castle in modern Ünye

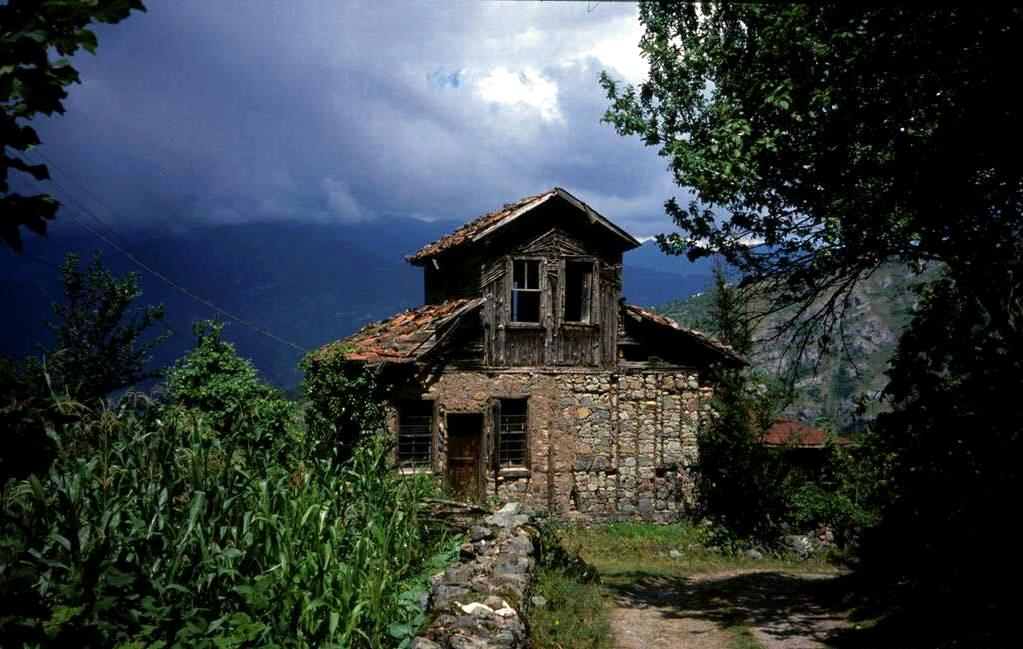
Traditional house in rural Trabzon

Examples of Pontian architecture date to the earliest Ancient Greek settlements in the region. Some Ancient Greek settlements which are still occupied include:

- Amisus (now Samsun)
- Kerasous (now Giresun)
- Kotyora (now Ordu)
- Neocaesarea (now Niksar)
- Nikopolis (now Koyulhisar)
- Oiniaon (now Ünye)
- Platana (now Akçaabat)
- Polemonion (now Fatsa)
- Sebastopolis (now Sulusaray)
- Sinope (now Sinop)
- Trapezous (now called Trabzon)

Ancient Greek cities in the Pontos include Ankon, Argyria, Boon, Eusene, Gadilon, Garzoubanthon, Gaziura, Gozalena, Heracleium, Hermonassa, Hieron Oros, Hyssus, Ibora, Ischopolis, Kabeira, Karoussa, Kizari, Komana Pontika, Koralla, Kordyle, Kyptasia, Laodicea Pontica, Libiopolis, Naustathmus, Ophis, Phazemon, Philocaleia, Pida, Potami, Saurania, Syderos, Themiscyra, Tripolis, Virasia, Zagorus, and Zaliche.

Sinope was the earliest Greek colony on the Pontic coast, established by Ancient Greeks from Miletus in the 7th or 8th century BCE. Ancient writers describe a gymnasium, stoa, agora, and aqueduct, since lost. The ancient Sinop Fortress, large fortifications which served to wall and defend the city, may have been built by Ancient Greeks or by the kings of Pontus. The fortifications were rebuilt and improved over the centuries. They contain many inscriptions in Greek, Latin, and Arabic. Kerasous (now Giresun) had similar fortifications. Archaeologists have discovered many rock tombs and necropolises from different cultures around the Pontos region. The Tombs of the kings of Pontus in Amasya is a more well-known example of a Pontian rock tomb, with many Pontic kings interred there in the 100s and 200s BCE.

Some structures date to Roman times. One such structure is Balatlar Church, which may have been a public bath or gymnasium before its later use as a church. Many frescoes were added in 1640; some remain, heavily damaged by vandalism.

Other structures were originally built as churches or monasteries. Three large, rural monasteries of the Matzouka region—Vazelon, Soumela, and Peristera—were all built during Roman or Byzantine times, with Peristera built last, likely during the 8th century. Vazelon and Soumela were likely founded in the 3rd or 4th century CE. These were male monasteries; Panagia Theoskepastos Monastery in Trapezounta was a women's monastery, endowed by Empress Irene in the 1340s. Like many churches and monasteries in the region, part of Panagia Theoskepastos Monastery was built into a cave. Anthony Bryer, a British Byzantinist, believes that the cave housing the church was once used to worship Mithras.

During the Byzantine era, further structures were built, including a number of castles. One is Samsun Castle, which was likely built by the Byzantines and expanded by the Turks at a later date. Anthony Bryer speculates that the lower portion of the castle was built in 1194 by Byzantines, while the upper portion was added by Turks after 1214. Oinaion Castle in modern Ünye may have been built by the Trapezuntines in the 14th century, or even earlier, by the Byzantines. The Byzantines and their successors, the Trapezuntines, built many fortifications, fortresses, and castles across the region. One such Trapezuntine fortress stands outside modern Fatsa, another in Tirebolu. In contrast to churches, castles, fortifications, and school buildings, homes were usually built from wood.

In Ottoman times, Pontians built villages, schools, and churches. The villages of Santa (today Dumanlı) were established by Pontians, possibly as early as the 1600s. Many stone buildings erected by the Pontian residents, including houses, schools, and churches, still stand. At Cape Jason near Sinope, a Greek Orthodox church stands dating to the late 1868. Wealthy Pontians in Trapezounta built the Phrontisterion of Trapezous in 1902. The school had previously operated at Soumela Monastery. The building still stands, functioning as a Turkish school.

== Religion ==
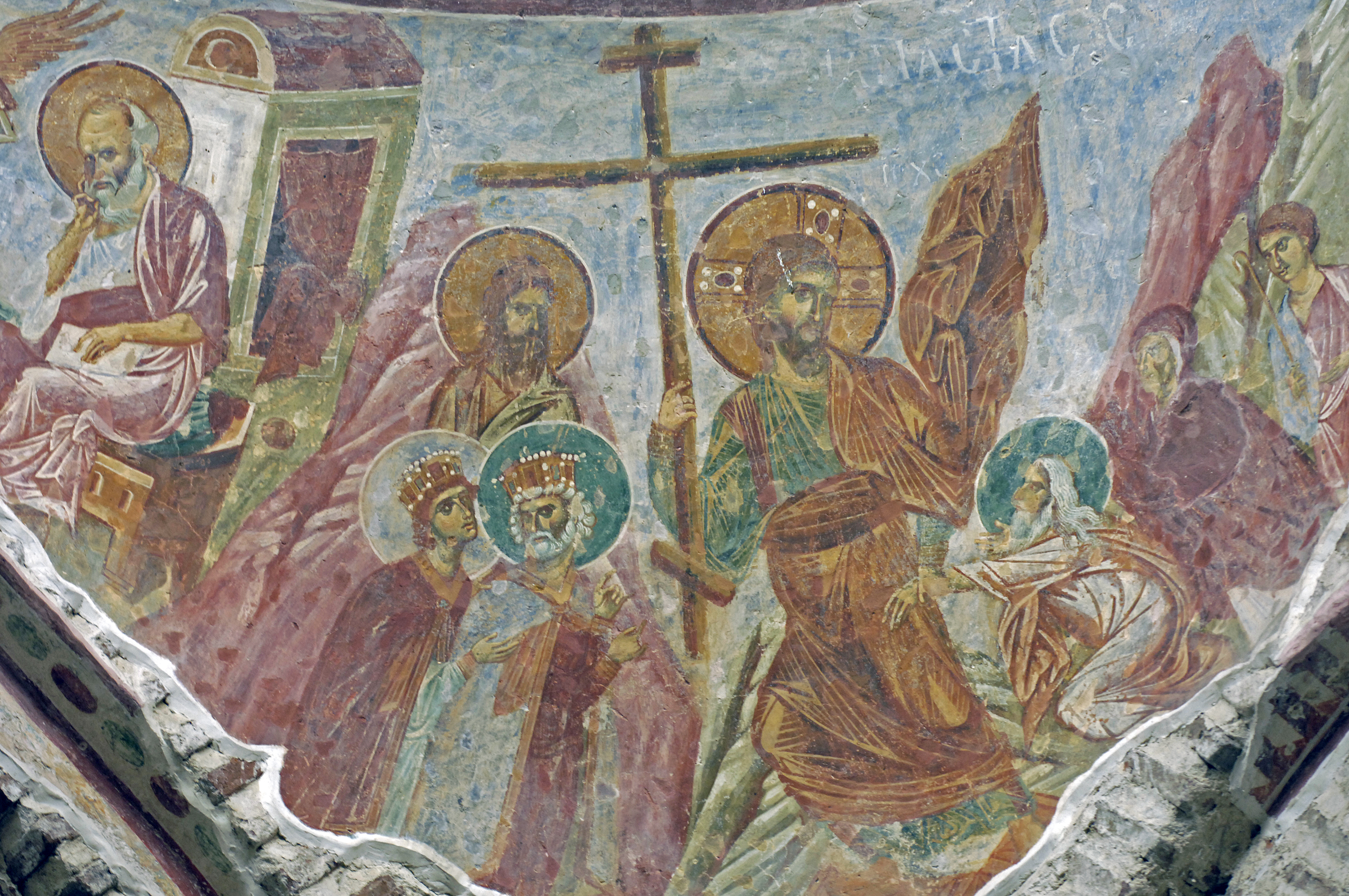
Fresco at the Hagia Sophia of Trapezounta depicts the Harrowing of Hell; Christ carries an Orthodox cross.

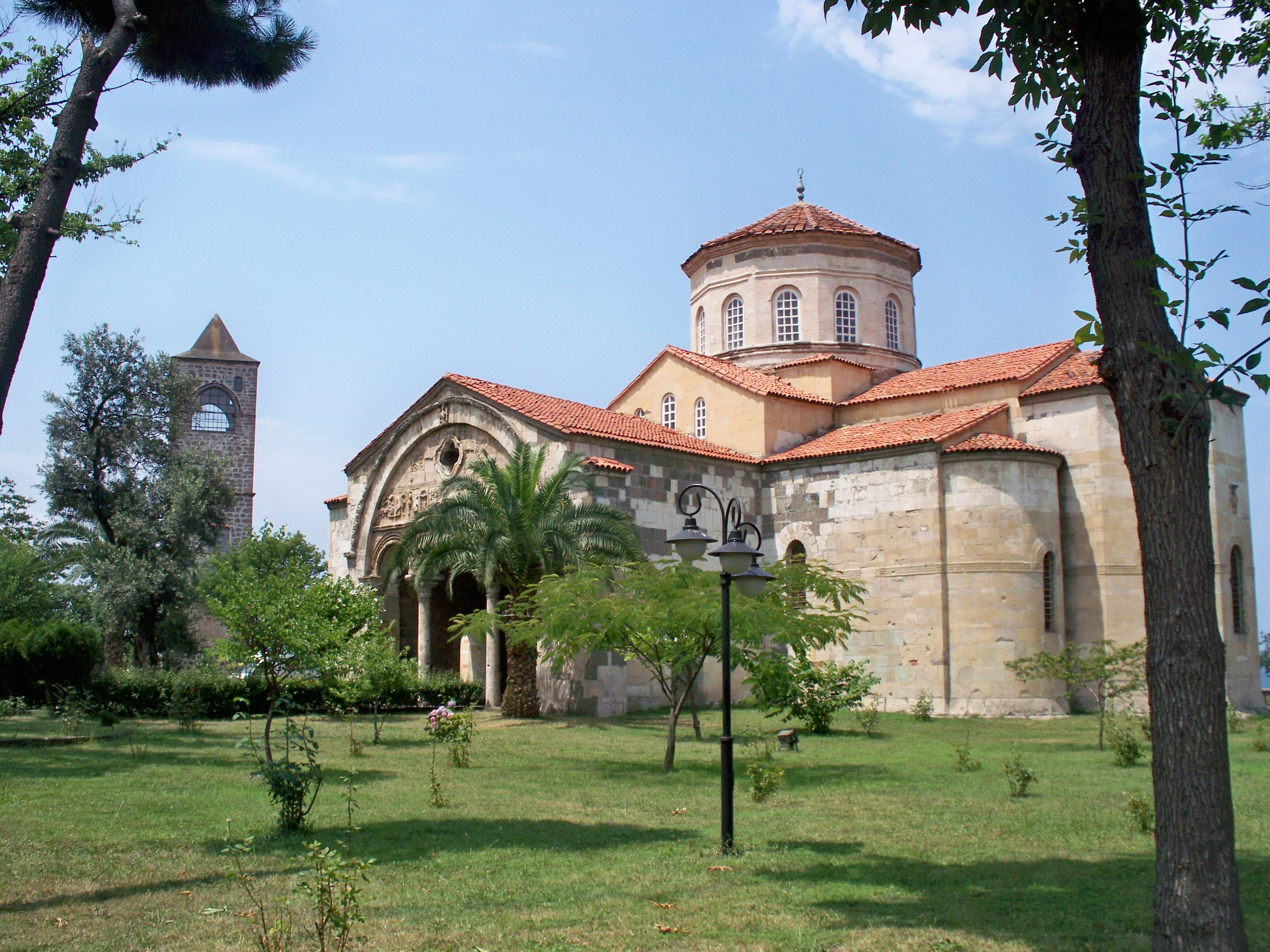
Hagia Sophia of Trapezounta, a Greek Orthodox church likely built during the reign of Manuel I Komnenos. It was converted to a mosque after Turkish conquest; the minaret is visible in the background.

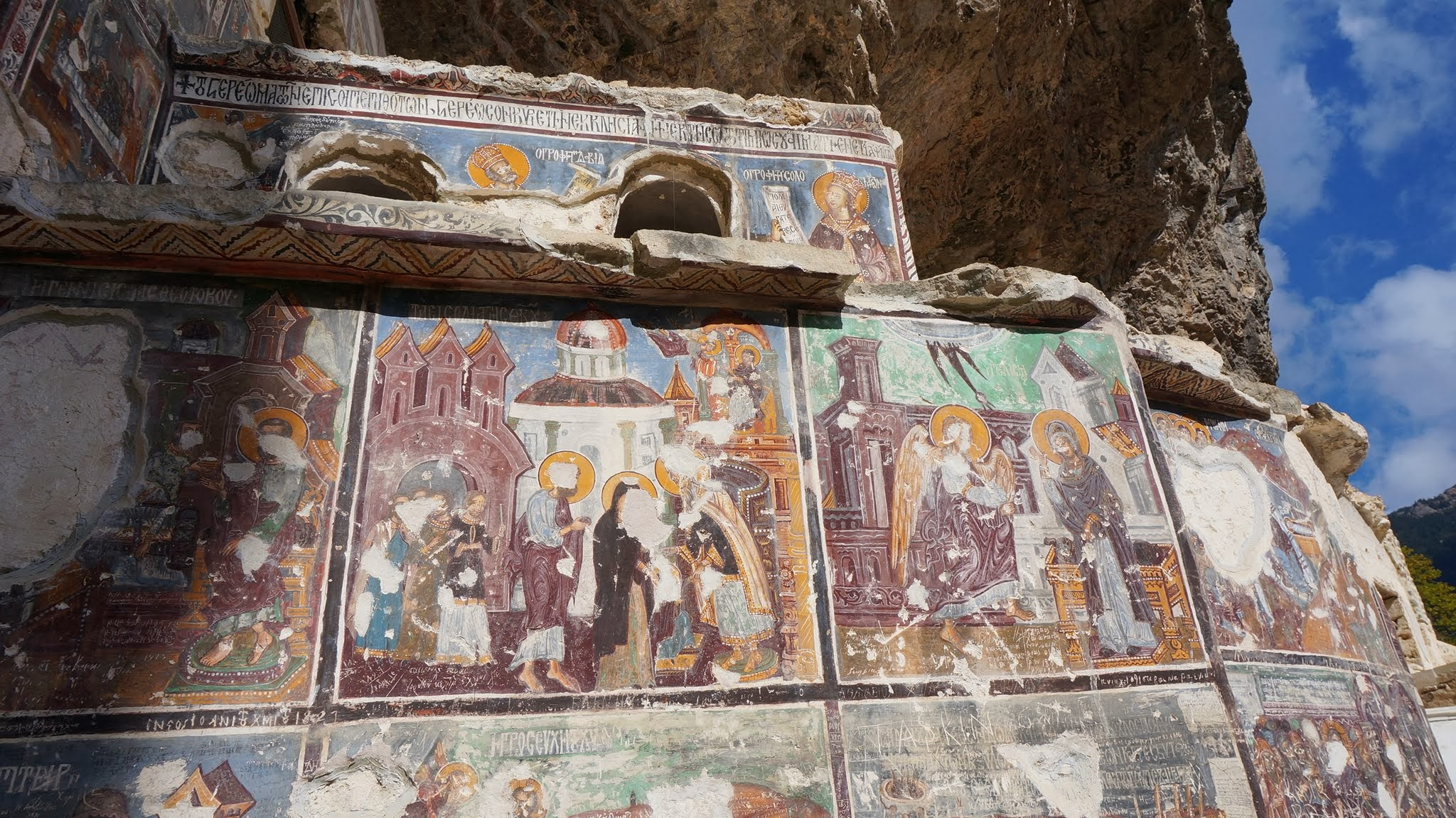
Vandalized frescoes at Sumela Monastery. The faces have been picked away.

Pontians traditionally practice Greek Orthodoxy, and have since Roman times. Some practice Sunni Islam. Many still live in Turkey; as Muslims, they were exempt from the population exchange in the early 1920s. Different communities converted to Islam for numerous reasons. A small minority of Pontians are Protestant, mostly owing to the evangelizing of 19th-century western missionaries.

Some early Christian saints and martyrs came from the Pontos region; not all of them were Pontian Greek. Saint Phocas, for example, was a martyr from 4th century Sinope on the Black Sea. He became the patron saint of sailors on the Black Sea and Eastern Mediterranean. Eugenios of Trebizond, a Pontian, was also martyred by the Romans. In hagiographies, he was said to have worked miracles. He enjoyed a cult following in the Pontos beginning in the 1100s. Pilgrims visited the Hagios Eugenios Church in Trapezounta, which was converted to a mosque after Turkish occupation. Another was Gregory Thaumaturgus, a third-century Pontian bishop from Neocaesarea who was said to work miracles.

One patriarch of Constantinople, John VIII of Constantinople, was born in Trapezounta c. 1110. He has been canonized as a saint by the Eastern Orthodox Church.

The monastic tradition was important to Greek Orthodoxy in the Pontos. Scholar Anthony Bryer estimates that there were around 700 monasteries in the Byzantine Empire from its early history up until the twelfth century, with half of these in Constantinople. Royals and wealthy laypeople funded the monasteries. The typical monastery had between ten and twenty monks Some of the monasteries in the Pontos with visible remains include Sumela Monastery, Vazelon Monastery, Panagia Theoskepastos Monastery, Peristera Monastery, and Virgin Mary Monastery. Panagia Theoskepastos Monastery was a women's monastery. Rural monasteries such as Sumela and Vazelon were much more likely to survive Turkish conquest than urban monasteries. Urban monasteries were more likely to be pillaged after conquest, and projects of Turkification were focused on the cities more than on rural areas. Rural monasteries had dependent peasants called paroikoi, which paid tribute to the monastery.

During the Tourkokratia, or centuries of Turkish colonial rule beginning in 1461, the majority of Pontians held onto their Orthodox faith. They were obligated to pay the haraç, a land tax levied on non-Muslim subjects of the Empire. Others converted to Islam in pursuit of wealth, power, and higher social status. Many grand cathedrals and churches of the Pontos were converted into mosques for the Turkish colonists, mirroring the infamous conversion of the Hagia Sophia in Constantinople. During the 1500s and 1600s, Turkish lords pushed Pontians out of their traditional farmland. They fled to high mountain villages, establishing such settlements as Of, Çaykara, Santa, Kurum, and Stavri-Imera. Many of the inhabitants were crypto-Christians who only declared their religion after the Ottoman Reform Edict of 1856. Many of the mountain villagers managed to avoid the haraç because the Ottoman government simply failed to record or acknowledge their settlements.

Crypto-Christianity in the Pontos is complex. In Romeika, Muslims who followed Christian practices were called klostoi, meaning "turned". The dominant narrative in Greece is that the Crypto-Christians superficially converted to Islam, continued to practice Christianity in private, and declared themselves Christians once they felt safe to do so. One notable group of Pontian crypto-Christians were the Kromlides, named for their origins in Kromni. They often bore both a Muslim and a Christian name. Many were linked to mining communities and as such enjoyed special privileges, such as exemption from military service and certain taxes. As the mines began to fail in the mid-19th century, some may have declared themselves Christians so they could continue to evade military service. Declarations of religion were often political rather than being solely based in faith. The Kromlides declared themselves Christians in 1857, while the Stavriotes, another crypto-Christian mining group, declared their faith in 1876 after the Constitution of the Ottoman Empire was signed. The Kromlides and Stavriotes were eventually accepted as Orthodox Christians and deported with the rest of Turkey's Greek Orthodox community in 1923.

In addition to Greek Orthodox and Sunni Muslim Pontians, there exists a small Protestant minority. This minority owes its existence to the evangelism of Western missionaries in the 19th and 20th centuries. Beginning in 1818, the American Board of Commissioners for Foreign Missions decided to send missions to West Asia, primarily Palestine and Ottoman Anatolia. They hoped to revive "oriental" churches, which they viewed as ignorant and backwards. In doing so, they hoped that the Christians' Muslim neighbors might also convert to Protestantism. The Board described the Greek Orthodox church as "primitive" and in need of revival. American missionaries first arrived in Smyrna in 1820. They were met with hostility by the local Christians and indifference by the local Muslims. They found more success in establishing schools for the local community. The missionaries also distributed Bibles in Greek. The Board opened a mission site in Trapezounta to preach to Pontians, with some success.

== Theatre ==
Modern Pontian theatre describes the theatrical tradition of Pontians in Greece after the population exchange. Plays are typically in Romeika and focus on Pontian themes. Theatre is a means through which Pontians in Greece maintain a sense of cohesive cultural identity and remember their origins, specifically to resist the threat of complete assimilation into wider Greek culture. This theatre tends to present a cohesive "pan-Pontic" identity and an idyllic view of village life. Theatre is a way of preserving Pontian culture, folklore, and traditions.

Pontian plays, like Pontian folktales, tend to feature underdog characters such as poor widows, orphans, and migrants. They may succeed through supernatural means, internal strength, or deception. In Stathis Efstathiadis' Trygona (1969), the eponymous heroine is a battered wife who must save herself and her daughter from predatory men with her wits alone. Other Pontian playwrights include Anna Vafeiadou, Polykarpos Haitas, and Filon Ktenidis. Also like Pontian folktales, Pontian plays typically end with a wedding. The focus on weddings is a way for playwrights to show, and the audience to believe, that the Pontian people have a future.

Pontian plays are not necessarily all idealized historical works about life before the exchange, however. For example, Stathis Efstathiadis wrote a play focusing on Pontians during the Greek Civil War. Some plays are historical dramas; one by Xenophon Akoglous focuses on Pontian guerrillas during the Greek genocide.

Pontian theatre troupes exist in Athens and throughout northern Greece to perform Pontian plays. The first of these troupes was founded in 1949.

== Holidays ==
=== Lent and Easter ===
Easter is traditionally the most important holiday for Greek Orthodox Pontians. Pontians fasted for the first three days of Lent (Sarakosti) then attended church and broke their fast. This tradition was called Aethodorizo. They also fasted on Wednesdays and Fridays during Lent. Parents hung a potato with seven feathers stuck in it from the ceiling. This potato, called a koukara, supposedly watched over the children. Adults told children that the koukara would notice if they did anything forbidden, such as breaking their fast or dancing. The family pulled out one feather each week. On the Saturday before Palm Sunday, which Pontians call St. Lazarus, women made kerkele, Easter cookies, to give to the local children.

On Palm Sunday, the children received palm fronds in church. They went door to door performing traditional chants. They received Easter cookies called kerkele, candy, money, and eggs. Throughout Holy Week, the women of the community prepared for Easter Sunday by cleaning their homes, cleaning the local church, and making new clothes to be worn during the Easter service. They made tsourekia, a type of sweet bread, on Maundy Thursday. They also made colored eggs on this day. The village priest anointed the faithful with holy oil. On Good Friday, young women in the community prepared the epitaphios in the church and decorated it with wildflowers.

Easter Sunday was a joyous holiday. People attended church services at four in the morning for the liturgy. Rifles were fired and dances performed to celebrate the resurrection of Christ. The priest began the first dance. Then, they went home to sing, dance, feast, and play games. People made Easter eggs in different colors and competed with egg tapping, called tsougrisma. They had a large Easter meal, usually meat or fish. A second church service was held later in the day. Afterward, people gathered in a public place to dance to the music of the touloum. Dancing lasted all night. Children also rolled their eggs down hills, a variant on egg tapping.

On the Second Sunday of Easter, or St. Thomas Sunday, people took food and wine to the cemetery and dined on the graves of deceased relatives. This is a way to honor the dead. Some Pontians living in Greece and the Caucasus still practice this tradition.

=== Celebration of Mary ===
Pontians celebrated the Virgin Mary on August 15. People gathered at Soumela Monastery and held icons of Mary.

=== Momogeri ===
Momogeri performance in Komotini, Greece, 2011

Momogeri (Note: Also spelled as momoyeri or momoeri) is a lighthearted winter tradition, traditionally held between December 24 (Christmas Eve) and January 7th (St. John's Day). The satirical tradition may be named for Momus, the Greek deity of mockery. It has its roots in ancient Greek folk performances. Momogeri is a public performance that blends folk dance and theatre. The performers themselves are called momogeri, which can be translated as "mummers". They perform public plays, typically on the street or in someone's home. Teacher and historian Christos Samoulidis described fifty separate momogeri plays from the Pontos.

Troupes of momgoeri may vary in size. They can range from fifteen to almost thirty people, with nine or ten being typical. The performers are all male, typically between age 15 and 25. The momgoeri themselves are also accompanied by dancers and musicians. Young boys may also accompany the troupe to sing kalanda, or begging carols, somewhat like "We Wish You a Merry Christmas" in English. The performers may be dressed as numerous stock characters: a bride, soldier, old woman, lead mummer (Chief Momogeros), doctor, devil, shepherd, camel, Horseman, Kizir (hero), various livestock, and Father Christmas.

Typically, the troupe asks permission to enter a house and may go over ritualized introductions to the members of the household. The performance may be preceded by caroling; it is typically always preceded by dancing. Then the momogeri perform the play. The players may ask for payment after the play or even as part of the performance - for example, the doctor character requests a fee to perform his services, which is provided by the audience. Householders may also provide the performers with food.

Momgoeri plays tend to fall into three categories: combat, abduction, and fainting. In the combat play, one man kills or gravely injures another, and other characters revive him, often via humorous and vulgar means (such as a young woman farting on his face). The play may also involve mourning the dead man, sending for the doctor, and involving the local authorities before the victim is eventually revived. In an abduction play, some characters abduct a young bride, and other characters must find and rescue her. In the fainting play, a person - typically a young woman - faints, and the other characters must revive them.

Modern Pontic folk dance groups in the diaspora, especially in Greece, perform Momogeri yearly.

=== Christmas and New Year's Eve ===
On Christmas Eve, school-age children went from door to door singing Christmas carols. When the church bells rang at four in the morning, families placed a great log, called a christokour in the fire to keep the fire burning all Christmas Day. (Note: In some regions, rather than burn a great log, people burned a small branch from a pear tree.) Then they went to church service. People visited their relatives and friends for three days of dancing and feasting. Children received small gifts. These were the three days of Christmas, called christoimera.

Between December 25, Christmas, and January 6, the Epiphany, Pontians believed that evil spirits called piziala roamed the Earth. This period was called dodekaimeron. The piziala were believed to encourage sin, so people avoided holding weddings and tried to avoid traveling at night.

On New Year's Eve, Pontian families cleaned the house. Children went from home to home singing carols to St. Basil of Caesarea. They received candy, nuts, dried fruit, and money. At home, families ate nuts and pie. The household stayed up late to tell tales and riddles until almost midnight. St. Basil supposedly passed over during the night to leave New Year's gifts for the children.

== Marriage and family ==
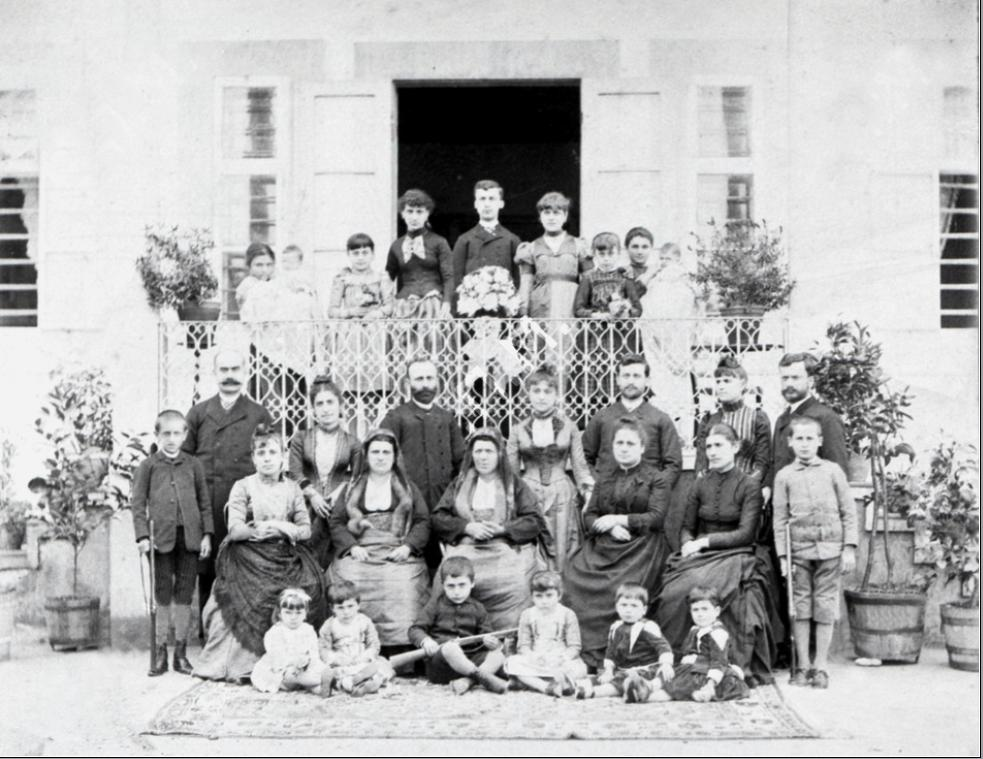
Urban Pontian family poses for a photograph in Trapezounta, early 1900s. Most wear Western clothes.

Pontian marriages were typically arranged. Matchmakers played an important role in arranging marriage between young people. Age at marriage differed from region to region. In crypo-Christian communities in Kromni, near Gümüşhane, girls married between the ages of 12 and 14, the same as Muslim girls did in the region. Boys also married young, but were typically slightly older than their brides. In others, such as the village of Iondone (Agios Antonios) near Fatsa, neither sex married until age 21, according to a woman who grew up there.

The family of the bride gave a large dowry to the family of the groom. Pontic Greek society is patrilineal: the bride traditionally took the name of the groom, and her children would take the father's name. Pontian names traditionally end in -idou or -ides/-idis, suffixes which mean "daughter of" and "son of" respectively. So, for example, a married couple might be Mr. Nikolaidis and Mrs. Nikolaidou. The surname is the same, but the gendered suffix is different. Additionally, Pontians traditionally practiced patrilocal marriage. The sons stayed home with their parents, while the daughters married and went to live with their husbands' families. The opposite occasionally occurred if a family had no sons. The daughters stayed at home; the daughter's husbands moved into the home and took the family name. In either case, households were multigenerational, with a couple, their sons, their daughters-in-law, and their grandchildren living in the same home. The grandparents, especially the grandmothers, traditionally play an important role in raising children and running the household. The grandmother traditionally held authority over other women in the household. She assigned housework, mediated conflict, and intervened when male householders abused their authority over the women.

The actual wedding ceremony and preparations differed depending on the location. Traditionally, weddings occurred on Sundays. Wedding preparations, dancing, and feasting happened in the days leading up to the wedding. People received gifts as wedding invitations. One tradition leading up to the wedding is the shaving and beautifying of the groom. The bride's clothing differed from region to region, but she traditionally wore a red or white veil, fine clothes, two headdresses, and golden jewelry. In most regions, the groom and his family went to get the best man from his house; then they both went together to get the bride and bridesmaids from the bride's house. The tradition of picking up the bride, which may have involved elaborate musical performances and gift exchanges, is called nyfeparman. Then, the whole group went to the church. (Note: Crypto-Christian communities held the religious ceremony within a house rather than a church.) Dances differed between villages, but in many areas, the newlyweds performed the Isaiah dance around a table during the church ceremony. The wedding ended with further dancing.

== Death and funerals ==
Funeral traditions differ from region to region. As most Pontians are Greek Orthodox, funeral traditions typically follow Eastern Orthodox memorial services. In many parts, for example Kotyora, the dead were dressed in fine clothes. Deceased newlyweds were buried in their wedding clothes. In Kromni and nearby villages, it was common to mark the grave with a gravestone in the shape of a church.

=== Funeral and memorial ===
While a person was dying, they gave relatives their blessing. They also received communion. The person was supposed to die surrounded by family; if they were apart from family, their soul would be at risk. After death, the neighbors would gather in the house to pay their respects. Relatives washed the dead person and dressed them in a shroud. The deceased was then placed in bed until the local carpenter could make a casket. The family dressed in black and sat around the bed with the dead person. The family stayed with the dead person until the casket was complete and the priest arrived, usually within a day. Upon the arrival of the priest, the women of the household wailed. One common lament was "Nto tha inoumes, nto tha ftame" ("What has happened to us? What are we going to do?")

The deceased (Pontic: apothaméno) was placed in the casket with wildflowers and a pillow for their head. During the funeral procession, the women wailed. Someone carried kollyva, a wheat dish made specifically for funerals. The kollyva contained raisins, sugar, pomegranate seeds, and nuts. The other villagers joined the funeral procession. The people sang laments. The funeral procession went to the church for a funeral service. Then, they went outside to the graveyard. Volunteers dug the grave, and the pillow beneath the deceased's head was replaced with a pillow of dirt. The priest threw dirt on the grave first, followed by the other mourners. A candle was placed on the grave; the candle stayed lit for forty days. On the fortieth day, the person's soul was believed to ascend to Heaven. During this time, women wore black, and men did not shave or cut their hair.

In small crypo-Christian communities, families buried their dead in secret with Orthodox rites on their own property. In larger communities, they immediately sewed the dead person into a shroud and delivered them to the local mosque. (Note: The shrouding was useful to hide the fact that Christian men, unlike Muslims, were uncircumcised.)

=== Superstitions around death ===
Owls are traditionally viewed as bad luck in Asia Minor. According to local superstitions in Santa, an owl on the roof was a sign that someone would die. Other superstitions around death also existed: for example, a dream about losing teeth indicated the death of a relative. Superstitions varied between regions. In Santa, after a death, the family would empty all the water jugs in the house, chase the cats outside, and open the windows. After a murder, the mother of the murdered individual would not eat meat from any animal killed during a hunt. It was also believed that a person could rise from the dead as a hortlak if they left unpaid debts.

== Bibliography ==
- Augustinos, Gerasimos (1986). ""Enlightened" Christians and the "Oriental" Churches: Protestant Missions to the Greeks in Asia Minor, 1820–1860". Journal of Modern Greek Studies. 4 (2). Johns Hopkins University Press: 129–142. doi:10.1353/mgs.2010.0039.
- Berikashvili, Svetlana (2022). "Contact-Induced Change in the Domain of Grammatical Gender in Pontic Greek Spoken in Georgia". Languages. 7 (79): 79. doi:10.3390/languages7020079.
- Bryer, Anthony (1980). The Empire of Trebizond and the Pontos. Variorum Reprints. ISBN 9780860780625.
- Bryer, Anthony; Winfield, David (1985). The Byzantine Monuments and Topography of the Pontos, Volumes I and II. Dumbarton Oaks Papers. ISBN 0-88402-122-X.
- Bryer, Anthony (1986). Continuity and Change in Late Byzantine and Early Ottoman Society: Papers Given at a Symposium at Dumbarton Oaks in May 1982. University of Birmingham. ISBN 9780704407480. OCLC 260168166.
- Drettas, Georges (1997). Aspects pontiques (in French). Association de recherches pluridisciplinaires. ISBN 2951034903.
- Fann, Patricia (1991). "Pontic Performance: Minority Theater vs. Greek Ideology". Journal of Modern Greek Studies. 9 (1). Johns Hopkins University Press: 107–122. doi:10.1353/mgs.2010.0098.
- Fann Bouteneff, Patricia (1996). "Exiles on Stage: Greek Pontian Theater, 1922-1972". Journal of Modern Greek Studies. 14 (1). Johns Hopkins University Press. ISSN 1086-3265.
- Fann Bouteneff, Patricia (2003). "Greek Folktales from Imera, Pontos". Fabula. 44 (3–4): 292–312. doi:10.1515/fabl.2003.018.
- Fann Bouteneff, Patricia (2007). "Persecution and perfidy: women's and men's worldviews in Pontic Greek folktales". In Buturović, Amila; Schick, İrvin Cemil (eds.). Women in the Ottoman Balkans: Gender, Culture, and History. I. B. Tauris. pp. 45–72. ISBN 9781845115050.
- Georgoulas, Renee; Southcott, Jane (2015). "A case study of a Greek Australian traditional dancer: Embodying identity through musicking". Victorian Journal of Music Education. 1: 9–17.
- Ioannidou, Elena (2022). "Language Contact and Borders among Pontic Greek and Cypriot Greek in Karpasia, Cyprus: Yours Don't Match with Ours". Languages. 7 (253): 253. doi:10.3390/languages7040253.
- Janse, Mark (2002). "Aspects of Pontic Grammar". Journal of Greek Linguistics. 3. John Benjamins Publishing Company: 203–231. doi:10.1075/jgl.3.10jan. ISSN 1569-9846.
- Kaltsa, Maria; Sitaridou, Ioanna (2010). "Topicalization in Pontic Greek". In Ralli, Angela; Joseph, Brian D.; Janse, Mark; Karasimos, Athanasios (eds.). E-Proceedings of 4th Modern Greek Dialects and Linguistic Theory. University of Patras. pp. 259–279.
- Liddle, Valerie (2013). Exile and migration of Pontic Greeks: the experience of loss as the presence of absence (PhD). University of Adelaide.
- Liddle, Valerie (2016). "Pontic dance: Feeling the absence of homeland". In Hemer, Susan R.; Dundon, Alison (eds.). Emotions, Senses, Spaces: Ethnographic Engagements and Intersections (PDF). University of Adelaide Press. pp. 49–65. ISBN 9781925261271.
- Mackridge, Peter (October 1991). "The Pontic Dialect: A Corrupt Version of Ancient Greek?". Journal of Refugee Studies. 4 (4). Oxford University Press: 335–339. doi:10.1093/jrs/4.4.335.
- Michailidis, Nikos (2016). Soundscapes of Trabzon: Music, Memory, and Power in Turkey (PhD). Princeton University.
- Morgan, Gareth (1990). "The Mummers of Pontus". Folklore. 101 (2). Taylor & Francis: 143–151. doi:10.1080/0015587X.1990.9715788. JSTOR 1260317.
- Papadopoulos, Steve (1984). Events and Cultural Characteristics Regarding the Pontian-Greeks and Their Descendants (PhD). New York University.
- Şentürk, Onur (June 2020). "Karadeniz Kemençesinin Yunanistan'daki İcra Geleneği" [Traditional Playing of the Black Sea Fiddle in Greece]. Erdem (in Turkish) (78): 189–212. doi:10.32704/erdem.749159. ISSN 1010-867X.
- Tsekouras, Ioannis (2016). Nostalgia, Emotionality, and Ethno-Regionalism in Pontic Parakathi Singing (PhD). University of Illinois at Urbana-Champaign.
- Tsekouras, Ioannis (2022). "Pastures of Love, Mountains of Sacrifice: Ιmaginings of Pontic Homelands in Parakathi Singing and the Postmemory of Trauma". Journal of Modern Greek Studies. 40 (2). Johns Hopkins University Press: 395–423. doi:10.1353/mgs.2022.0027.
- Tyrovola, Vasiliki; Karepidis, Ioakeim K.; Kardaris, Dionysios G. (September 30, 2007). ""Ποντιακοί Χοροί": Παρελθόν και Παρόν Δομική-Μορφολογική και Τυπολογική Προσέγγιση" ["Pontic Dances": Past and Present Structural-Morphological and Typological Approach]. Inquiries in Sport and Physical Education (in Greek). 5 (2): 240–263. ISSN 1790-3041.
- Tzedopoulos, Yorgos (2009). "Public Secrets: Crypto-Christianity in the Pontos". Bulletin of the Centre for Asia Minor Studies. 16 (165): 165. doi:10.12681/deltiokms.15.
- Vavritsas, Nikolaos; Moisidis, Kyriakos; Vavritsas, Georgios (January 2014). "The Pontic dance 'Tik'. Ethnographic and rhythmic element". Research in Dance Education. 15 (1). Taylor & Francis: 83–94. doi:10.1080/14647893.2012.721761. ISSN 1464-7893.
- Zografou, Magda; Pipyrou, Stavroula (2016). "Dance and Difference: Toward an Individualization of the Pontian Self". In Meglin, Joellen A.; Matluck Brooks, Lynn (eds.). Preserving Dance Across Time and Space. Taylor & Francis. p. 267. ISBN 9781134906383.
