= Potamoi =

Potamoi (Ancient Greek: Ποταμοί) may refer to:

- River gods (Greek mythology), personifications of rivers (potamoí)
- Potamoi (Bithynia), a town of ancient Bithynia
- Potamoi (Paphlagonia), a town of ancient Paphlagonia
- Potamoi, Drama, in Greece
