= Naustathmus =

Naustathmus or Naustathmos (Ancient Greek: Ναύσταθμος) may refer to:

- Naustathmus (Cyrenaica), a town of ancient Cyrenaica, now in Libya
- Naustathmus (Pontus), a town of ancient Pontus, now in Turkey
