= Ophis =

Ophis is Greek for "serpent", and may refer to:

- The constellation Serpens
- Ophis (Pontus), a town of ancient Pontus, now in Turkey
- Ophis (river), a river of ancient Anatolia
- Serpent (Bible), a figure in the Hebrew bible
- SS Ophis, a cargo ship built in 1919 and which was sunk in 1942 when named Empire Antelope
- Ophis (High School DxD), a character in the light novel series High School DxD

== See also ==
- Apep
