= Pida =

Pida or PIDA may refer to:

- Phenyliodine(III) diacetate, a reagent used in organic chemistry
- Pida, Nepal, a village
- Pida (moth), a moth genus
- Pida (Pontus), a town of ancient Pontus, Anatolia
- PIDA, an open source environment written in the Python language
- PIDA (polymer), a molecule also known as poly(diiododiacetylene)
- Public Interest Disclosure Act 1998, a British whistleblower law
