= Thomia =

Thomia was a small town of ancient Paphlagonia, situated between Stephane and Cape Syrtas (modern İnceburun), appearing on the Peutinger Table.

Its site is unlocated.
