= Virasia =

Town in the west of ancient Pontus

Coordinates: 40°36′56″N 35°34′43″E

Virasia was a town in the west of ancient Pontus, inhabited in Byzantine times. According to the Tabula Peutingeriana it was on the road from Antoniopolis through Anadynata to Amasia, 16 M.P. from the latter.

Its site is located near Doğantepe, Asiatic Turkey.
