= Philocalia =

Philocalia (/fɪləˈkeɪliə/) may refer to:

- Philocalia (Origen), compiled by Basil the Great and Gregory Nazianzen
- Philokalia, a medieval compilation of sayings of the Fathers of the Church
- Philocaleia, a town of ancient Pontus, now in Turkey
