= Cerasus (near Trapezus) =

Town in ancient Pontus

Coordinates: 41°03′29″N 39°19′09″E

Cerasus or Kerasous (Ancient Greek: Κερασοῦς) was a town of ancient Pontus, on the Black Sea coast, a little to the west of Trapezus. The Ten Thousand, in their retreat, came to Trapezus, and leaving Trapezus, "they arrive on the third day at Cerasus, an Hellenic city on the sea, a colony of the Sinopeis, in Colchis." The Anonymous geographer of Ravenna places Cerasus 60 stadia east of Coralla, and 90 west of Hieron Oros, and on a river of the same name. The name, and possibly the population, of the town were translated to Pharnacia in the Hellenistic era.

Its site is tentatively located near Gelida Kale in Asiatic Turkey.
