= Enosi Pontion Pierias =

Pontic Greek cultural organization

Coordinates: 40.269743°N 22.498867°E

The Pontic Greek Association of Pieria, known in Greek as Enosi Pontion Pierias (Ένωση Ποντίων Πιερίας), is a cultural organization based in Katerini, Greece, aiming to preserve the culture of the Pontic Greeks living in the Pieria regional unit.

== Location ==
Seat of the association is the Mitropoliti Trapesountos Chrisanthou 13, 60100 Katerini, Pieria, Greece.

== History ==
The first wave of the settlement of the Pontic Greeks in Pieria took place between 1920 and 1922. With many more arriving during the population exchange between Greece and Turkey. These refugees came directly from the Ottoman Empire. After 1939, another immigration from the former Soviet Union took place. To maintain the cultural peculiarities of the Pontic Greeks, in 1928 the Enosi Pontion Pierias (Greek: Ένωση Ποντιών Πιερίας) was founded, which was registered in 1932 officially as a club.Since June 1998 it has been a member of the International Council of Organizations of Folklore Festivals and Folk Arts, CIOFF. The aim of the founding members was the preservation and maintenance of the:

- Pontic culture
- the Pontic language and
- the history of the displaced

In the first years after its founding, the association was the focal point for problems of all kinds. The members soon became involved in the fields of theater, folk dancing and folk music. From the beginning, so in the new environment no longer needed, pontic language was maintained within the club. The club has 740 members (as of August 2018)

On boards, the historical development of the Pontic region from the time of the first settlement (around 700 BC) to the escape is shown. In terms of mythology, the journey of the Argonauts, the Amazons and Prometheus are worth mentioning. The most prominent among the philosophers of the region was Diogenes. The Pontic eagle was around 450 BC stamped on coins of the city of Sinope. Based on historical and contemporary photographs, magazines and copies of official publications, the recent history is displayed.

The statutory duties of the association:

- Positive shaping of the ethics of the members.
- The development of spiritual attachment and solidarity among the members.
- The preservation of the Pontic tradition.
- Learning the Pontic language and the Pontic dances.
- The preservation of traditional Pontic music and song.
- The briefing of members in Pontic history and Pontic Hellenism.
- Studying and promoting solutions to the problems that affect Pontic Hellenism in general.
- Contribution to the implementation of the decisions, both of the General Federation of the Pontic peoples in Greece, as well as of the Pontic World Conference.

== Building ==
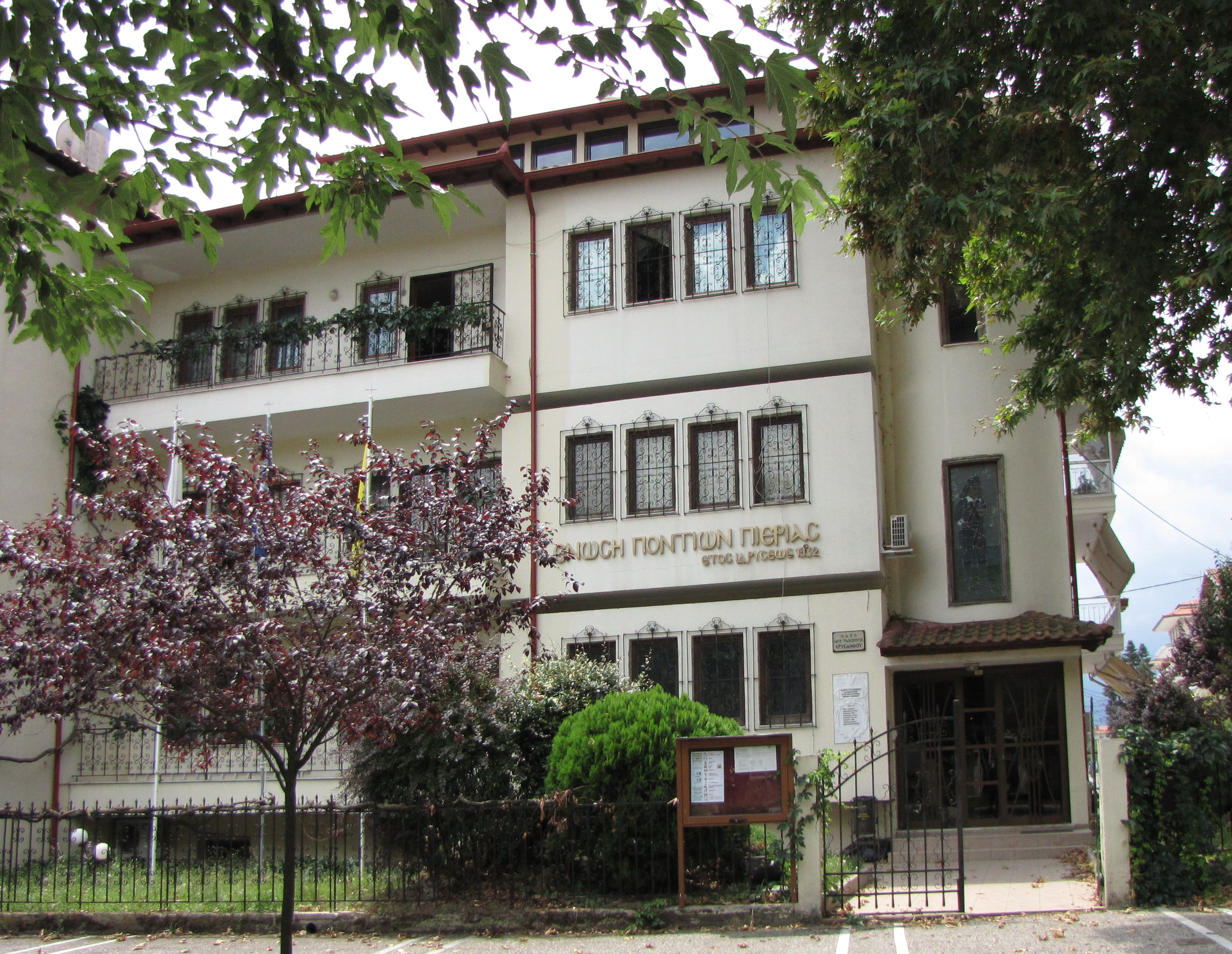
Enosi Pontion Pierias, building

The building is the property of the association, the land was given to the Enosi by the city of Katerini. The house has three floors, a cellar and attic:

- Cellar - training room for the dance group
- Ground floor - museum of Pontic history
- First floor - meeting room for about 160 people
- Second floor - office and meeting room
- Attic - workshops (weaving, mosaic, wood carving etc.)

== Departments ==
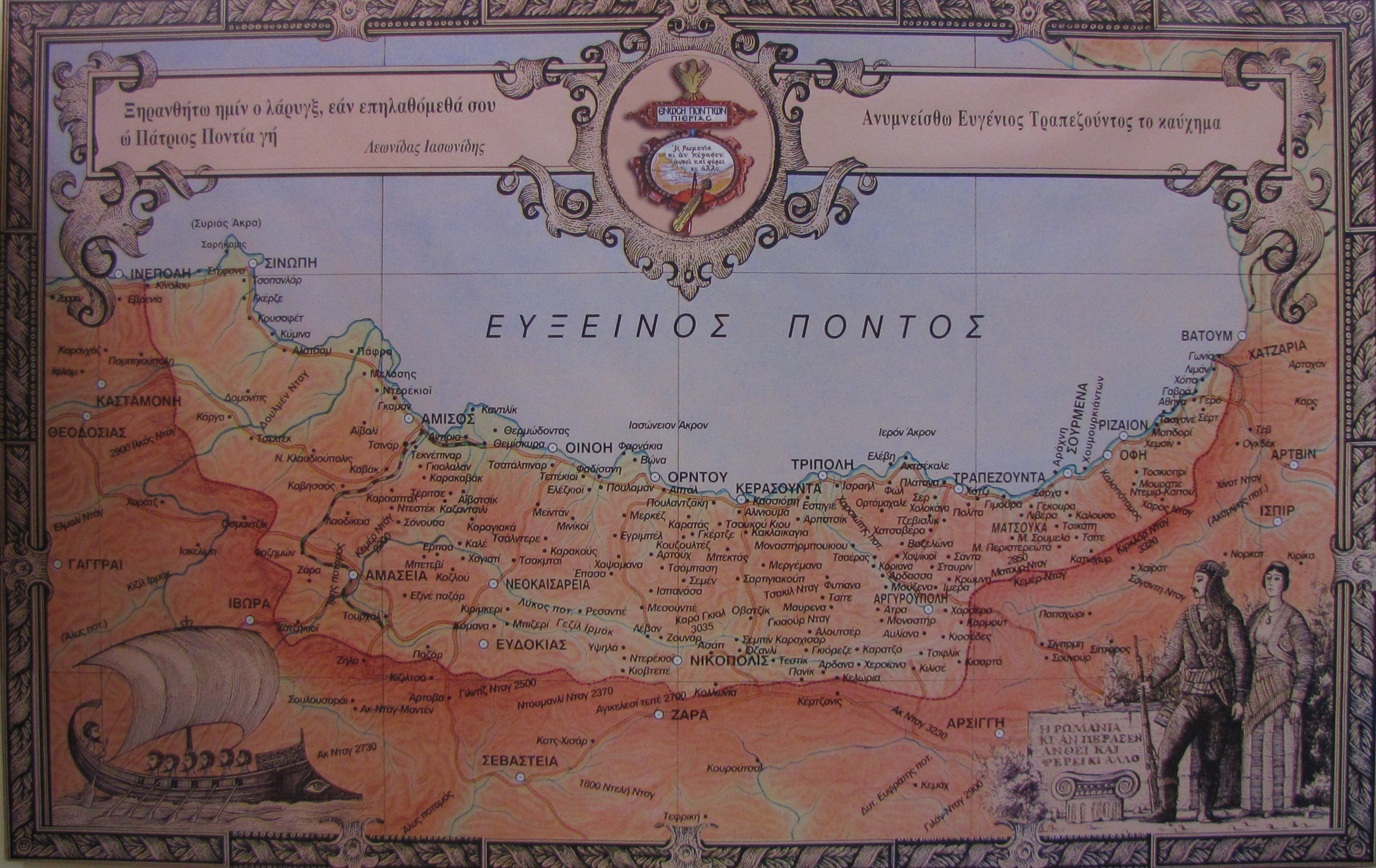
Enosi Pontion Pierias, map

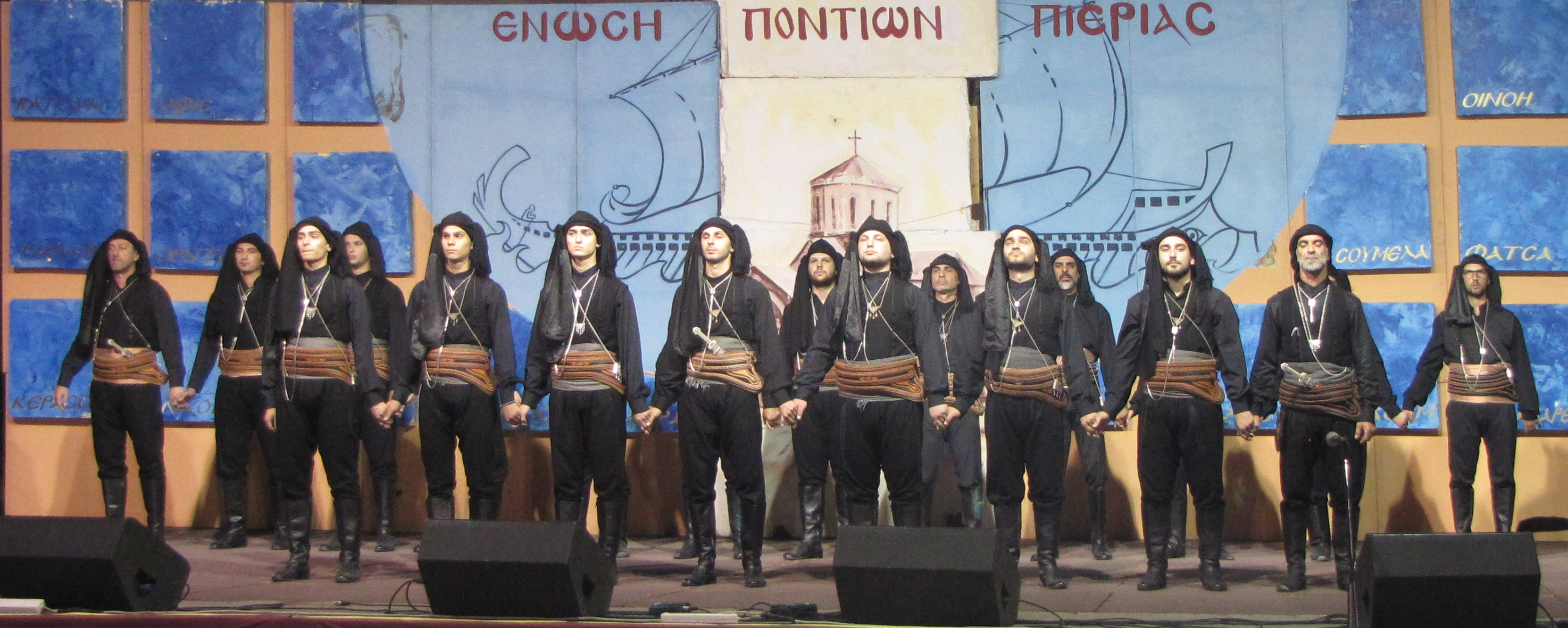
Enosi Pontion Pierias, concentration before starting the dance

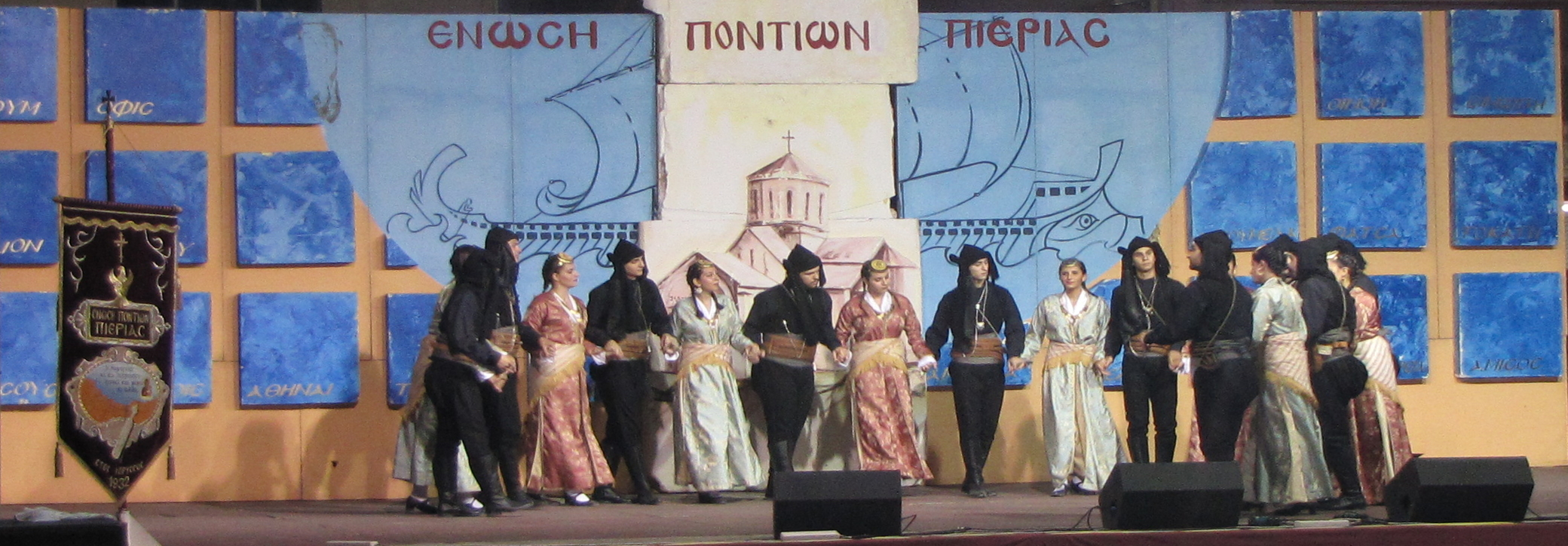
Enosi Pontion Pierias, mixed dance group

- Pontic folk dance: The dance group has 150 members and is one of the most active groups of the club. For appearances, the club holds around 200 Pontic costumes. The dance group performs throughout Greece and in other European countries.
- Pontic Music: Currently (August 2018), about 20 young musicians are taught the use of classical Pontic musical instruments. The main focus is on the lyre.
- Theater: classical pontic pieces are performed in Pontic language. Performances also take place outside Pieria in other Greek cities.
- Choir: The second pillar for the care of the old language. The members perform in Pieria, other cities of Greece and abroad.
- Museum of Local History: The exhibits are currently (at least in August 2018) to be restored, the museum is therefore closed.
- Library: The association owns both, contemporary and historical literature from Pontic writers and Pontic themes. The publication of a house magazine had to be discontinued for financial reasons and was largely substituted by social media.
- Blood donation: The members are animated by an in-house blood donation organization. Through actions, people outside of the club are also called to blood donations.
- Miscellaneous: A group of interested people are taught the classic weaving techniques. Some members are dedicated to painting, their works are exhibited from time to time. In addition to wood carvings and mosaics, other traditional arts and crafts are taught. Women make sure that the recipes of traditional pontian cuisine are not forgotten.

== Activities ==
Several times a year trips to the old home on the Black Sea are organized. In addition to the former capital of Trapezounda (now Trabzon), other historically important places such as the Panagia Soumela Monastery or the Ecumenical Patriarchate of Constantinople in today's Istanbul are visited.

In Katerini, the association organizes a multi-day summer festival with dance and theater every year.

Further activities:

- Participation in the annual dance festival of the Pontic Association of Greece.
- Meetings and lectures in the premises of the association.
- Excursions within Greece.
- Presentation of books.

== Literature ==
History of the Enosi Pontion Pierias (Ένωση Ποντιών Πιερίας). Publisher Enosi Pontion Pierias, 2003
