= Ophius =

Ophius or Ophious (Ancient Greek: Ὀφιοῦς) may refer to:

- Of, Turkey, a town
- Ophis (river), a river
