= Antoniopolis =

Antoniopolis may refer to:

- Antoniopolis (Paphlagonia), a town of ancient Paphlagonia
- Antoniopolis, later name of Tripolis on the Meander, a town near the frontiers of ancient Phrygia, Lydia, and Caria
