= Hieron Oros =

Town in ancient Pontus

Coordinates: 41°06′00″N 39°25′26″E

Hieron Oros was a town of ancient Pontus on the Black Sea coast of Asiatic Turkey. Though now disappeared, the site is thought to have been around 25km west of Trabzon at the northeastern tip of Çarşıbaşı-Fener municipality, on a cape that's now topped by a French-built lighthouse dating from 1886. Though the lighthouse is now in a village known as Fener, the lighthouse itself still bears the name Yoroz, one of three names (along with Ieros and Oros) reported for the place by 19th-century British traveller H. F. B. Lynch who described it in 1893 as the promontary of the "sacred mountain". According to Barrington, the site is also known as İncir Liman (literally Fig Harbour) though the local name for the small fishing port is Yoroz Limanı.

The anonymous 8th-century geographer of Ravenna places Hieron Oros 90 stadia east of Cerasus, itself 60 stadia east of Coralla (sited where today is the town of Eynesil)
