= Cinolis =

Greek port town on the coast of ancient Paphlagonia

Coordinates: 41°57′46″N 34°09′16″E

Cinolis or Kinolis (Ancient Greek: Κίνωλις), also known as Cimolis or Kimolis (Κίμωλις), was a Greek small port town on the coast of ancient Paphlagonia. According to Arrian it was situate 180 stadia west of Stephane, but according to Marcian of Heraclea only 150. The nearby town of Anticinolis was located 80 stadia from Cinolis.

Its site is located near Ginoğlu, Kastamonu Province, Turkey.
