= Ophis (Pontus) =

Town in ancient Pontus

Coordinates: 40°56′17″N 40°15′51″E

Ophis (Ancient Greek: Ὄφις) was a town of ancient Pontus on the Black Sea near the mouth of the Ophis River, 90 stadia east of Hyssus.

Its site is located near Of in Asiatic Turkey.
