= Anticinolis =

Ancient city in Turkey

Coordinates: 41°57′17″N 34°10′23″E

Anticinolis or Antikinolis (Ancient Greek: Ἀντίκινωλις), also known as Anticimolis or Antikimolis (Ἀντίκιμωλις), was a small town on the coast of ancient Paphlagonia, located 80 stadia from Cinolis.

Its site is located opposite to Cinolis in Asiatic Turkey.
