= Potami (Paphlagonia) =

Port of ancient Paphlagonia

Potami or Potamoi (Ancient Greek: Ποταμοί) was a fortified port on the coast of the northeastern part of ancient Paphlagonia. According to Arrian, it was 150 stadia to the northeast of Stephane, but according to others only 120.

Its site is located near Gibelit in Asiatic Turkey.
