= Cyptasia =

Town in ancient Paphlagonia

Coordinates: 41°55′42″N 35°04′07″E

Cyptasia or Kyptasia (Ancient Greek: Κυπτασία) was a town on the Black Sea coast of ancient Paphlagonia. The name appears as Cloptasa in the Tabula Peutingeriana was 7 Roman miles from Sinope on the road to Amisus.

It is located near Eren Boğazı in Asiatic Turkey.
