= Garzoubanthon =

Town in ancient Paphlagonia

Coordinates: 41°44′09″N 35°13′20″E

Garzoubanthon or Orgibate was a town on the Black Sea coast of ancient Paphlagonia, a station on the road heading east of Sinope during Byzantine times.

It is located near Kurzuvet in Asiatic Turkey.
