= Karadere (river) =

River in Trabzon, Turkey

Coordinates: 40.9384°N 40.0649°E

The Karadere is a river that empties into the Black Sea 20 miles east of Trabzon, Turkey. In ancient times it was known as the Hyssos or Hyssus.

== See also ==
- Sürmene, ancient Hyssos
