= Balatlar Church =

Byzantine church in northern Turkey

Coordinates: 42.0261°N 35.1572°E

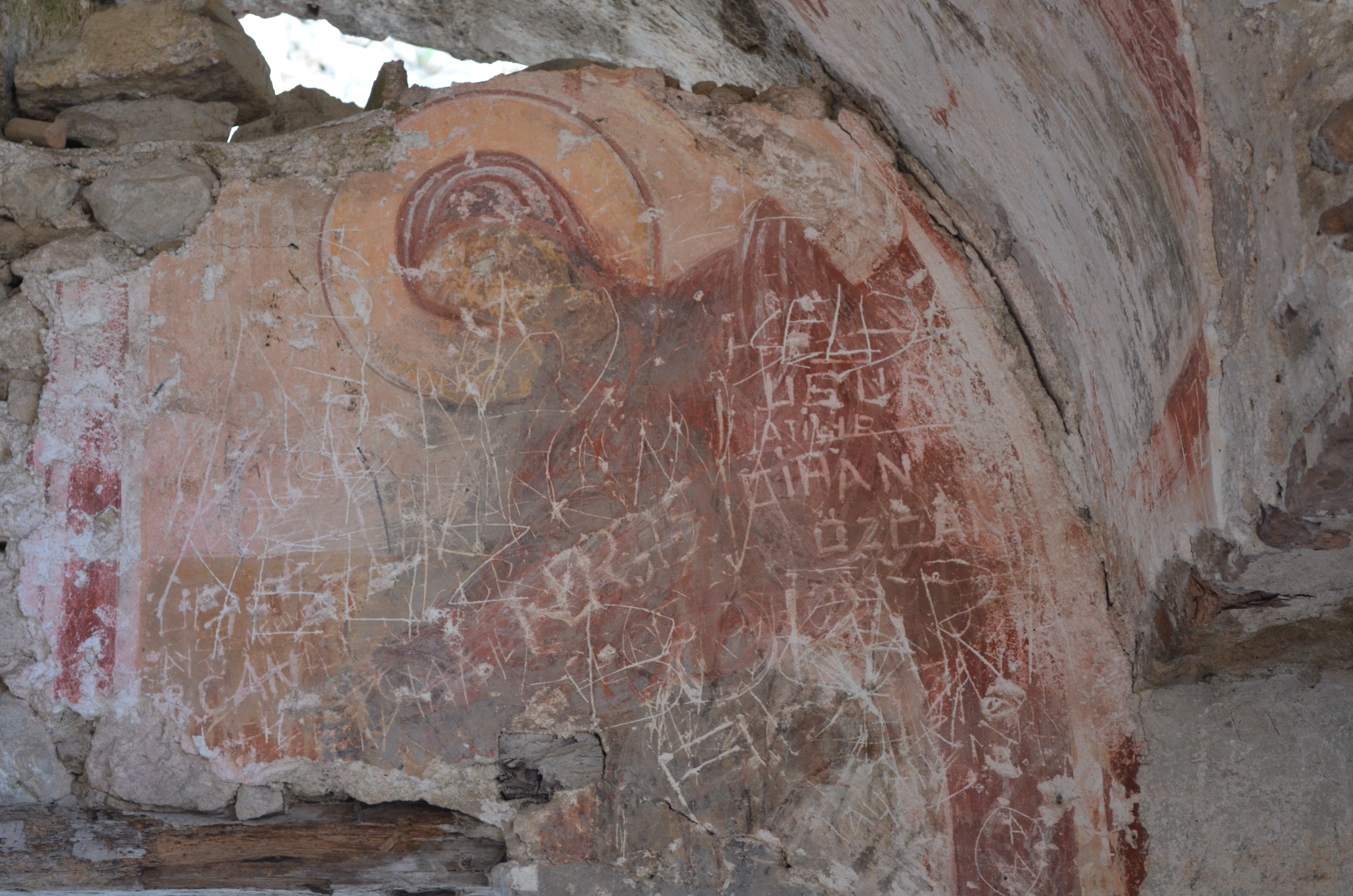
The Fresco of Virgin Mary, which is located in the damaged inner wall of the Balatlar Church

Balatlar Church or Sinope Koimesis Church originally built as a Roman Imperial bath in the 2nd century, the complex, featuring spaces such as the Palaestra, Frigidarium, Tepidarium, Caldarium, and Laconicum, was converted into a church in the late 4th or early 5th century. The church remained in use until the late 20th century and was transformed into an Orthodox burial ground during the Ottoman era, with numerous burials taking place both inside the building and in its courtyard, establishing it as a significant cemetery for the Orthodox community.

The church is located in the northern province of Sinop, Turkey, on the shores of the Black Sea.

All frescoes of Jesus, Mary, mother of Jesus and saints are heavily damaged because of the human and weather factors.

== Archaeological excavations ==
Since 2009 the site has been the scene of archaeological excavations by Mimar Sinan Fine Arts University under the direction of Professor Gülgün Köroğlu of the university's art history department. Turkish archaeologists have found a piece of a stone with crosses carved on it.

In remarks to the press, Köroğlu said: “We have found a holy thing in a chest. It is a piece of a cross, and we think it was [part of the True Cross]. This stone chest is very important to us. It has a history and is the most important artifact we have unearthed so far." Köroğlu added, "We have also found a number of human bones during our excavation, we have been working here for four years and have found more than 2,000 skeletons. We have learned many things during the excavation that we did not previously know.”

Many mosaics and reliquary fragments have been discovered. In the Frigidarium, which was transformed into a Nekhorion (burial chapel), the mosaics were crafted using the opus tessellatum technique and the inscriptions on the mosaic panels indicate that they were commissioned as offerings by the relatives of those buried there.

During 2024 excavations, archaeologists discovered a 19th-century skull inscribed with the Greek words "Pilgrim Dimitrakis", the first known example of this burial tradition in Anatolia, though similar cases have been found in Greece and Egypt. The skull, believed to belong to a cleric who had made a pilgrimage to Jerusalem, reflects an ancient Orthodox practice of inscribing and displaying skulls.
