= Syderos =

Town of ancient Pontus

Coordinates: 40°24′52″N 36°58′32″E

Syderos was a town of ancient Pontus, inhabited during Roman and Byzantine times.

Its site is located near Yuvaköy in Asiatic Turkey.
