= Saurania =

Town of ancient Pontus

Coordinates: 40°41′53″N 37°35′59″E

Saurania (Ancient Greek: Σαυρανία), or Sauronisena, or Saunaria (Σαυναρία), was a town of ancient Pontus, inhabited during Roman and Byzantine times. It was in the later province of Pontus Polemoniacus, and mentioned by Ptolemy.

Its site is tentatively located near Gölköy in Asiatic Turkey.
