= Eusene =

Town in ancient Pontus

Coordinates: 41°22′23″N 36°13′53″E

Eusene (Ancient Greek: Εὐσήνη) was a town of ancient Pontus, not far from the coast, a little to the northwest of Amisus. The Tabula Peutingeriana calls it Ezene. The anonymous Geographer of Ravenna calls it Aezene and Ecene.

Its site is tentatively located near Incesukahvesi in Asiatic Turkey.
