= Libiopolis =

Ancient Anatolian town

Coordinates: 41°04′08″N 39°11′54″E

Libiopolis was a town in ancient Pontus on the Black Sea coast.

Its site is located near Yuvabolu in Asiatic Turkey.
