= Naustathmus (Cyrenaica) =

Town in ancient Cyrenaica

Coordinates: 32°54′46″N 22°10′08″E

Naustathmus or Naustathmos (Ancient Greek: Ναύσταθμος) was a port and anchorage on the coast of ancient Cyrenaica, 100 stadia from Apollonia.

Its site is located near Marsa Hilal, Libya. The remains which have been found there indicate an ancient site.
