= Ischopolis =

City in ancient Pontus

Coordinates: 40°56′17″N 38°11′42″E

Ischopolis (Ancient Greek: Ἰσχόπολις) was a city in ancient Pontus. It was near the city of Pharnacia, and was said to be in ruins during the time of Strabo, however is still mentioned by Ptolemy.
