= Anadynata =

Town of ancient Paphlagonia

Coordinates: 40°50′24″N 33°15′36″E

Anadynata was a town of ancient Paphlagonia, inhabited in Byzantine times.

Its site is located near Kurşunlu, Asiatic Turkey.
