= Philocaleia =

Town in ancient Pontus

Coordinates: 41°02′04″N 38°59′06″E

Philocaleia or Philocalia or Philokaleia (Ancient Greek: Φιλοκάλεια) was a town on the coast of Pontus Cappadocius, 90 stadia to the east of Argyria, and 100 to the west of Coralla.

Its site is located near modern Görele in Asiatic Turkey.
