= Gozalena =

Town of ancient Pontus

Coordinates: 40°34′58″N 36°02′39″E

Gozalena was a town of ancient Pontus, inhabited during Roman times.

Its site is tentatively located near Ezinepazar in Asiatic Turkey.
