= Zagorus =

Town in ancient Paphlagonia

Coordinates: 41°40′40″N 35°24′40″E

Zagorus or Zagoros (Ancient Greek: Ζάγωρος), also Zagorum or Zagoron (Ζάγωρον), and also Zagora (Ζάγωρα), Zageira (Ζάγειρα), or Zacoria, was a town on the Euxine coast of ancient Paphlagonia on the road between Sinope and the mouth of the Halys River, from the latter of which it was distant about 400 stadia.

Its site is located near Çayağzı in Asiatic Turkey.
