= Sinop Fortress =

Historic castle in Sinop, Turkey

- Sinop Province, Turkey
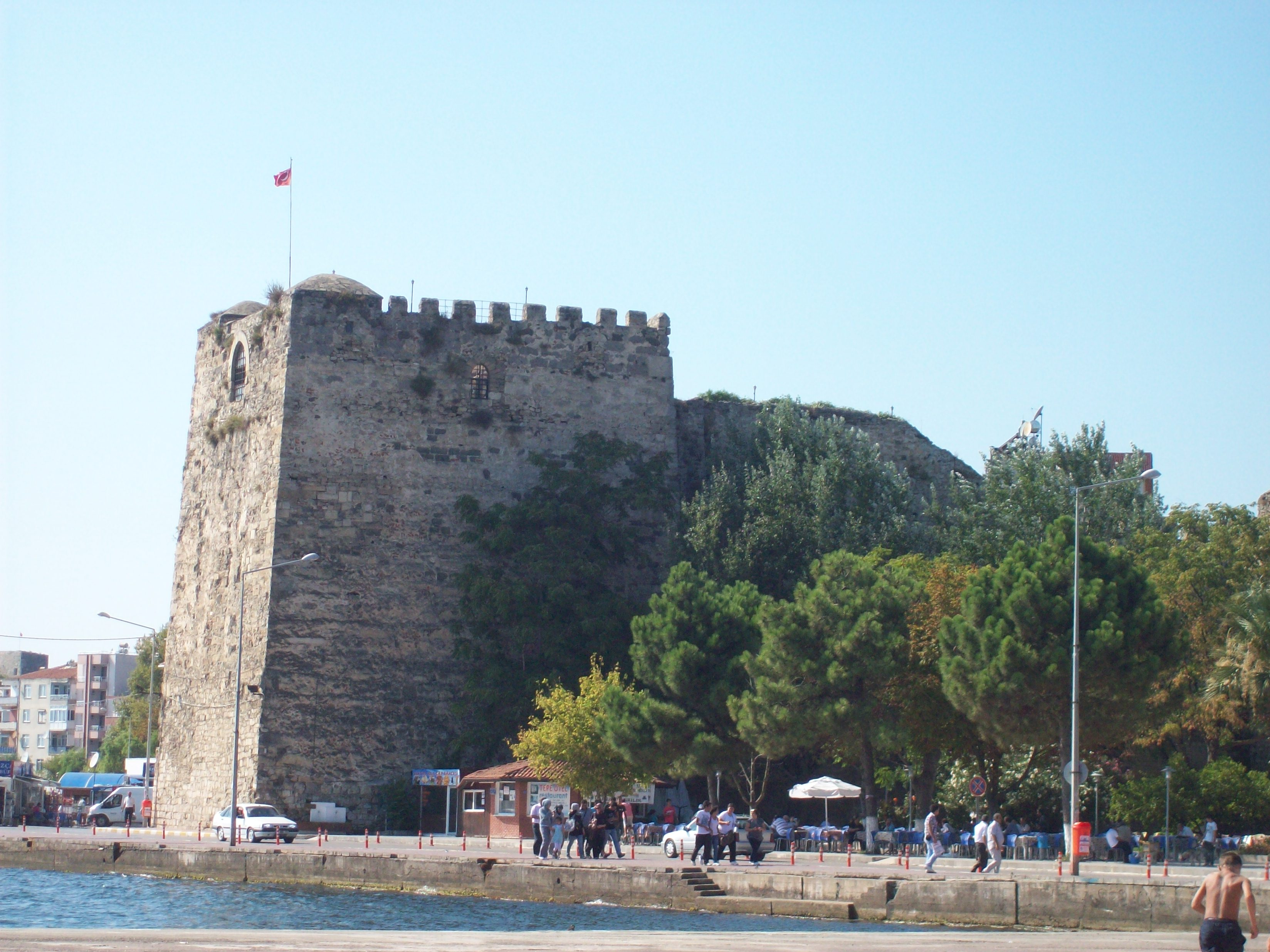

Site information
- Type: Fortress
- Open to the public: Yes

Location
- Location within Turkey
- Coordinates: 42°01′42.5″N 35°08′47.3″E

Site history
- Built: 8th century

Sinop Fortress is a historic castle in Sinop, Turkey.

== Location ==
The castle is located in Sinop district of Sinop Province, at the northern most point of Turkiye. The historical Sinop Fortress Prison is situated in the castle.

== History ==
Sinop Fortress was built in the 8th century by immigrants coming from Miletus. The Genoese improved the fortress. The castle was included in the World Heritage Tentative List in 2013. The castle underwent restoration starting in 2019.

== Architecture ==
Length of the bastions and walls are 2,000 meters. Bastions are 8 meters wide and 25 meters high.
