= Naustathmus (Pontus) =

Town in ancient Pontus

Coordinates: 41°29′51″N 36°07′00″E

Naustathmus or Naustathmos (Ancient Greek: Ναύσταθμος) was a port-town on the Euxine, in the western part of ancient Pontus, on a salt lake connected with the sea, and 90 stadia to the east of the Halys River. The Tabula Peutingeriana calls it Nautagmus. The Anonymous Periplus places it only 40 stadia east of the mouth of the Halys.

Its site is located in Asiatic Turkey.
