= Antoniopolis (Paphlagonia) =

Town of ancient Paphlagonia

Coordinates: 40°48′41″N 32°53′36″E

Antoniopolis (Greek: Αντωνιόπολις) was a town of ancient Paphlagonia, inhabited in Roman and Byzantine times.

Its site is located near Çerkeş, Asiatic Turkey.
