= Argyria (Pontus) =

Town of ancient Pontus

Coordinates: 41°00′20″N 38°52′12″E

Argyria (Ancient Greek: Ἀργυρία) or Argyra (Ἀργυρά) was a town of ancient Pontus, located 20 stadia east of Tripolis. It was noted for its silver mines, whence the town's name (άργυρος is Greek for 'silver').

Its site is located near Halkavala in Asiatic Turkey.
