= Pida (Pontus) =

Town of ancient Pontus

Coordinates: 40°43′11″N 36°26′24″E

Pida (Ancient Greek: Πίδα), or Pidae or Pidis, was a town of ancient Pontus, inhabited during Roman and Byzantine times. It was in the later province of Pontus Galaticus, on the road leading from Amasia to Neocaesareia.

Its site is located near Akça in Asiatic Turkey.
