= Stephane (Paphlagonia) =

Port town on the coast of ancient Paphlagonia

Coordinates: 41°57′08″N 34°32′23″E

Stephane (Ancient Greek: Στεφάνη) was a small port town on the coast of ancient Paphlagonia, according to Arrian 180 stadia east of Cimolis, but according to Marcian of Heraclea only 150. The place was mentioned as early as the time of Hecataeus of Miletus as a town of the Mariandyni, under the name of Stephanis (Στεφανίς). The town is also mentioned in the Periplus of Pseudo-Scylax and by the geographer Ptolemy. The name is written Stefano in the Peutinger Table.

Its site is located near Istifan, Asiatic Turkey.
