= Ophis (river) =

Former river in ancient Pontus

Coordinates: 40°57′00″N 40°17′00″E

The Ophis (Ancient Greek: Ὄφις), also called the Ophius or Ophious (Ὀφιοῦς), was a river of ancient Pontus, the mouth of which was 90 stadia to the east of port Hyssus, and which separated Colchis from the country of the Thianni.

It is identified with the modern Istala Dere in Asiatic Turkey.
