= Hyssus =

Town in ancient Pontus

Coordinates: 40°56′33″N 40°02′22″E

Hyssus, also spelled Hyssos (Ancient Greek: Ὕσσος) and known as Hyssi portus, or Susarmia (Σουσάρμια), or Susurmaina (Σουσούρμαινα), or Psoron Limen (Ψωρῶν λιμήν), was a port-town of ancient Pontus on the Black Sea coast, at the mouth of the Hyssus River, 180 stadia east of Trapezus. The Tabula Peutingeriana calls it Hyssilime. It seems to have been a place of some importance; for it was fortified, and had the "cohors Apuleia civium Romanorum" for its garrison.

Its site is located near Araklıçarşısı in Asiatic Turkey.
