= Coralla =

Town in ancient Pontus

Coordinates: 41°04′30″N 39°09′55″E

Coralla or Koralla (Ancient Greek: τὰ Κόραλλα) was a town of ancient Pontus on a cape of the same name. It is placed by Arrian, and the anonymous author of the Periplus, 100 stadia east of Philocaleia, and Philocaleia is 110 stadia east of Tripolis, a well-known position.

That site is located near today's town of Eynesil on the Görele Point between Giresun and Trabzon on the Black Sea Coast of Anatolia, Turkey.
