= Pontic Greek music =

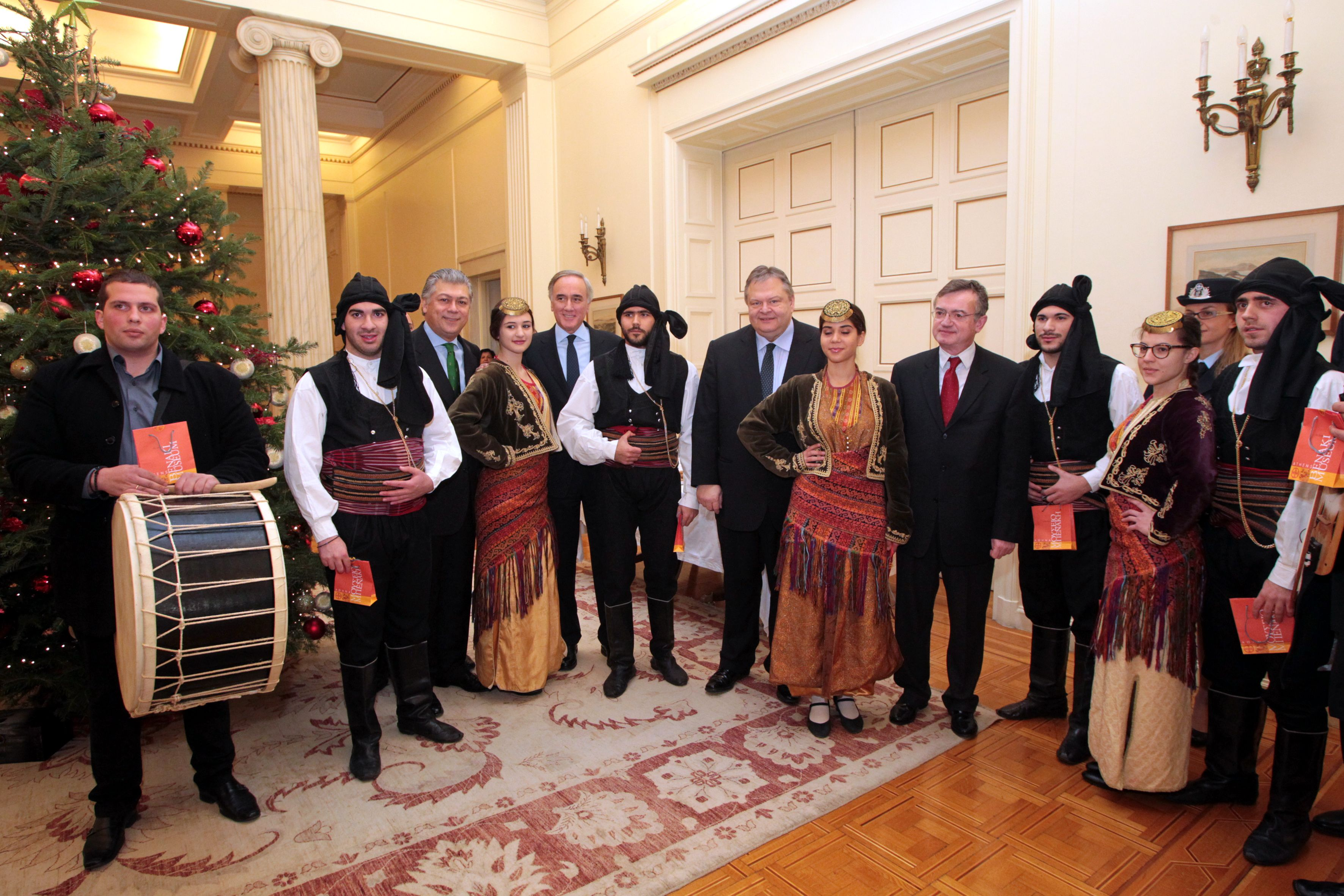
- A Pontian dance group with a daouli player (left) poses before a performance.
- Stylistic origins: Laz music, Byzantine music, Ottoman music
- Cultural origins: Pontos region, modern Turkey
- Typical instruments: lyra; daouli; touloum; zourna; floghera; kemane; oud

Subgenres
- Neopontic

Pontic Greek music, also called Pontian Greek music, comprises the musical traditions of the Pontic Greeks from antiquity to the modern day. Song and dance have a long history in the Pontos, ranging from ancient dances to the Acritic songs to folk songs. Certain dances date to ancient times, such as the pyrrhichios. Pontian music has evolved alongside Pontic dance.

Acritic songs, which describe folk heroes such as Digenes Akritas who lived and fought on the borders of the empire in Byzantine times, date to the medieval era. These songs were also sung in other parts of the Byzantine empire. Versions of the Acritic songs exist today, accompanied by modern Pontic instruments and singing techniques. More recent folk songs include love songs, mourning songs, and war songs. These date to the late 1800s or earlier during Ottoman times. After the Greek genocide and 1923 population exchange pushed most Pontians out of their traditional homeland, Pontians wrote new folk songs about their experiences in the diaspora. In the 1970s, the Neopontic genre emerged, combining traditional Pontian folk music with contemporary Greek popular music.

Traditional instruments used in the 21st century include the lyra, daouli, zourna, dankiyo, touloum, and oud. Pontian folk music often incorporates polyphony, which is the simultaneous use of multiple melodies. Pontic music is structured in hexachords and typically has a rapid tempo. Asymmetric rhythms are common. Instrumental music may be accompanied by vocals, and singers typically use vibrato. Some songs are set up in a call-and-response style, with a lead singer and a chorus. The 5/8 rhythm is typical of modern Pontic music.

Pontic Greek music has been influenced by the various cultures present in the Black Sea region throughout history, especially Laz music.

== Cultural role ==
When Pontian refugees came from the Pontos to Greece in the 1920s, they brought traditions of music and folklore with them. Between the 1950s and the 1980s, Pontian clubs used music, dance, and folklore to portray themselves as both patriotic Greeks and as a distinct group unto themselves. At the time, Pontian singers tended to censor songs with Turkish verses in order to assimilate into Greek society. In the 1980s, as the original generation of Pontian refugees began to die off, Pontian musicians focused on remembering the original refugees and their experience. Musicians began to openly perform Pontian songs with Turkish verses, such as "Tsambasin."

A parakathi, or muhabeti, is an form of social get-together for Pontians, describing "a banquet where music is the main activity." Parakathia are informal gatherings, usually late at night, where Pontians eat, drink, sing, and play music. Parakathi gatherings feature music, including epitrapezia, or "tabletop melodies." Tablemates go back and forth, singing original or remembered rhyming couplets to one another. The couplets are in iambic meter or trochaic meter. The lyra provides instrumental support. The goal of a parakathi performance is to express emotions through the use of remembered verses, and to share these feelings with one's community. Couplets may be used to communicate sorrow, to express longing, or to flirt. Scholar Ioannis Tsekouras argues that parakathi gatherings first emerged among refugees as ways to discuss their memories of genocide and deportation.

== Instruments ==
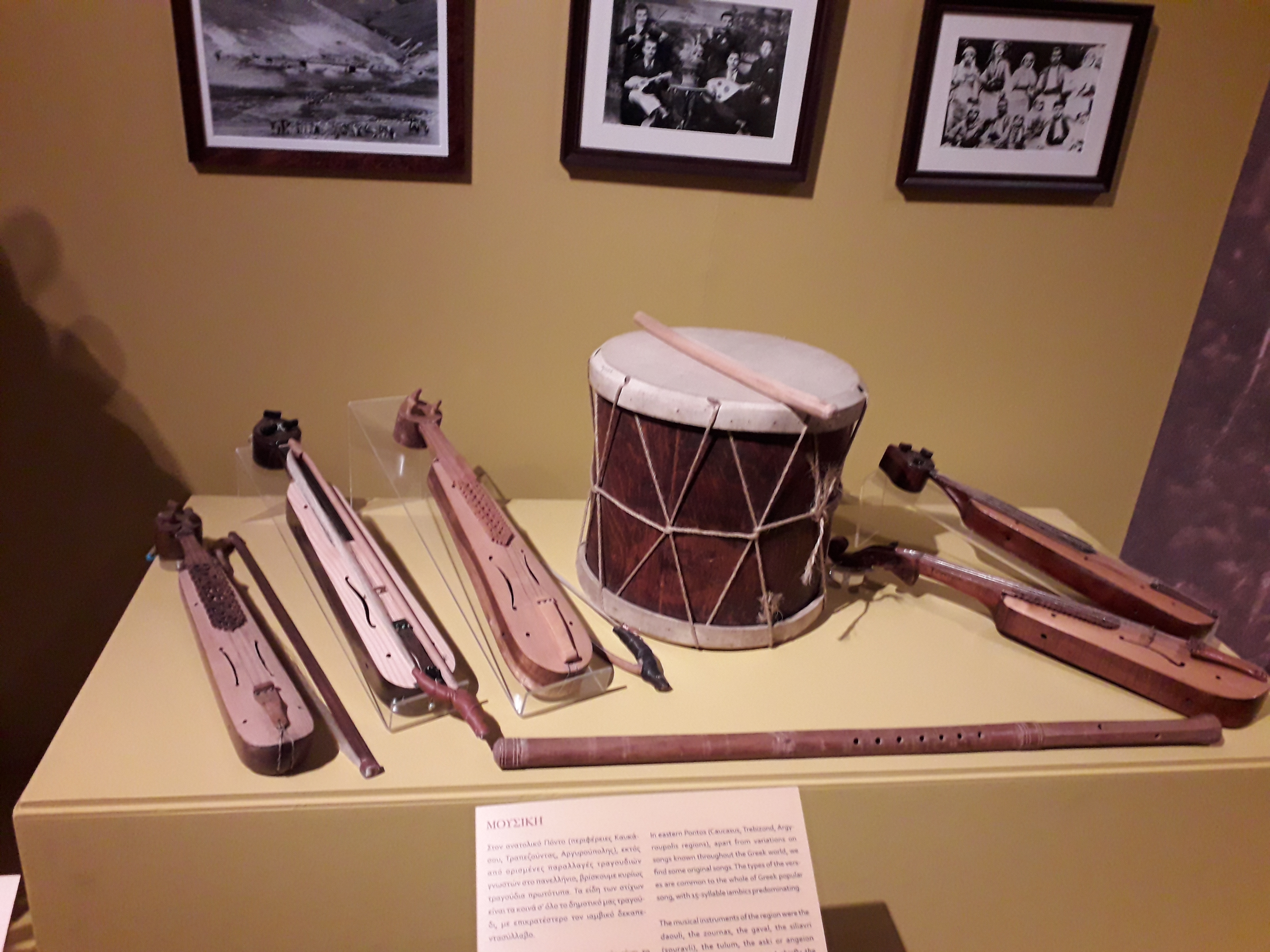
Various Pontian musical instruments in the Benaki Museum in Athens. There are various lyras to the left and right of a daouli (drum); in front is a zourna.

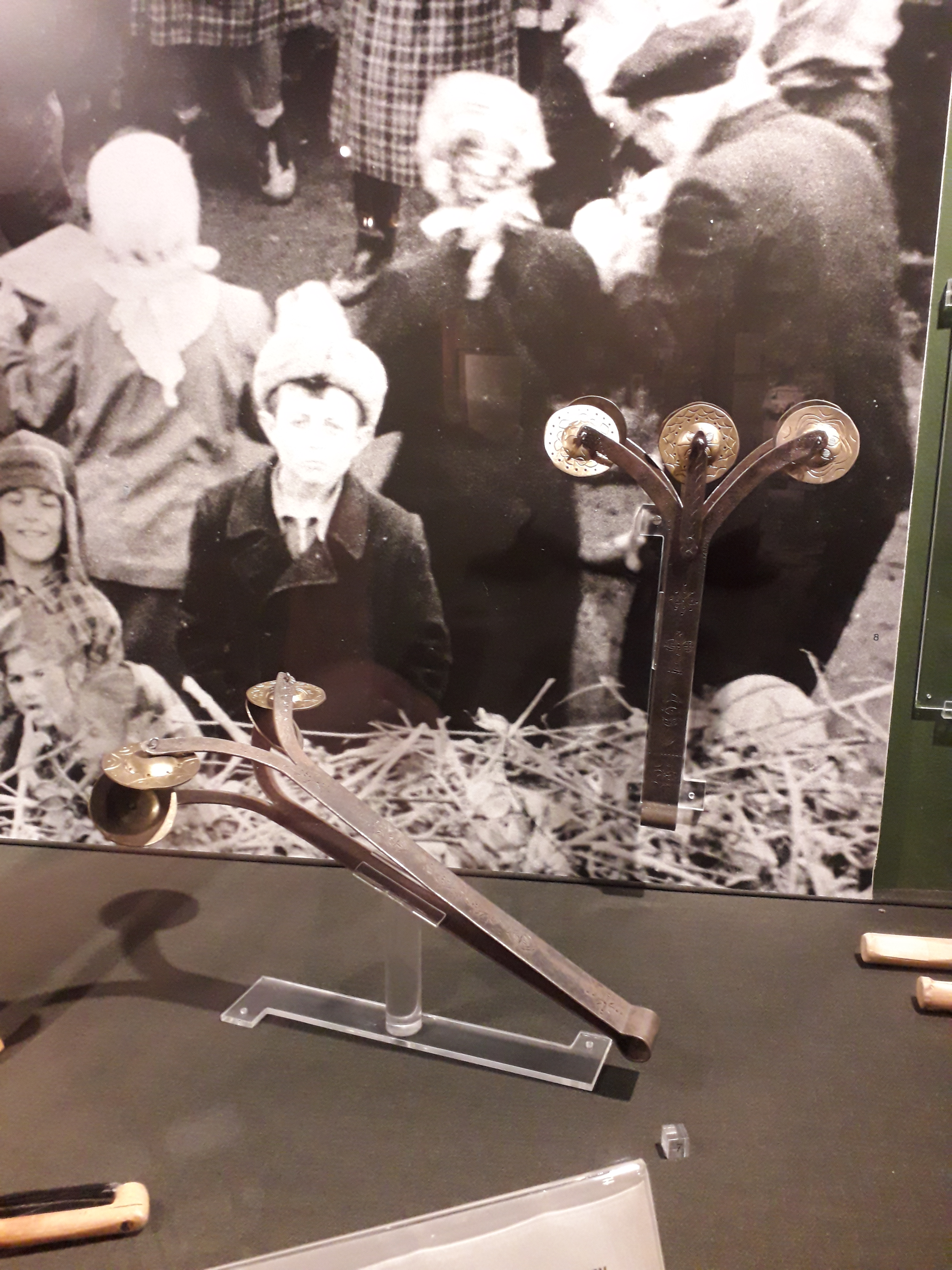
Masa, a handheld percussion instrument, in the Museum of Pontian Hellenism in Athens.

Pontian musicians utilize a variety of instruments. One of the most commonly played instruments is the lyra, also called the Pontic kemençe or simply the kemençe. Pontians use their own language, Romeika, to describe instruments and their parts. For example, the soundholes on a lyra are called rothónia, literally "nostrils."

=== Lyra ===
The lyra is a three-stringed instrument made of dense wood. The instrument is tuned in fourths, typically from the highest string to the lowest string. Lyras come in three different sizes: the largest, about 60 cm (24 in) long, is called the kapani and has the lowest pitch. The smallest, the zil, is 45 cm (18 in) long, and it has the highest pitch. The zilokapano falls in the middle, both with regards to size and pitch.

Trills and mordents are common in lyra playing. The player, or lyraris, holds the instrument in their non-dominant hand, using their fingers to manipulate the strings. Like in violin, the lyraris presses down on the strings vertically. They hold the bow (doksar) in their dominant hand to play the lyra. The instrument is not held against the musician's chin, as with the violin; rather, the body (skafí) may rest in the musician's lap, or the neck (ghoúla) may rest against their shoulder. The lyraris may sing or lead a dance while playing. To produce polyphonic sounds, the lyraris presses down two strings with the same finger. There are four different hand positions for lyra playing, with first position being the most common.

The origin of the lyra is unknown. It may have ties to the Persian kamancheh or to other Byzantine or medieval European instruments. The lyra is shared with other cultures in the area, including Lazes and Turks. In rural parts of the Black Sea region, Islamic preachers have decried the lyra as a gavur aleti, a "giaour (infidel) instrument." There is some stigma associated with the lyra; in Turkey, stereotypes exist of lyra players as promiscuous, irreligious alcoholics. Some devout Muslims in the Black Sea area believe that playing the lyra is a sin. Nevertheless, it is an important part of the local folk culture.

The lyra is the best-known Pontian instrument and, according to musical scholar Ioannis Tsekouras, it "functions as an emblem of Pontic identity." The lyra is used to represent Pontian identity in works of visual art and sculpture.

=== Daouli ===
The daouli is a percussion instrument used by Pontians. This double-sided drum is used throughout the Middle East and the Balkans, where it goes by many different names. A daouli is made from a wooden cylinder, usually beech or walnut, covered by goatskin on both sides. The instrument is suspended by a strap around the percussionist's neck and torso. The percussionist plays by hitting the daouli with two wooden drumsticks. One is thicker, and is held in the dominant hand; the other, thinner drumstick is held in the non-dominant hand. Sizes of daoulia may vary. Illustrations of the daouli appear in Byzantine manuscripts from the 800s. It is always played alongside other instruments, typically at large outdoor gatherings. The daouli is traditionally played alongside the lyra.

=== Touloum ===
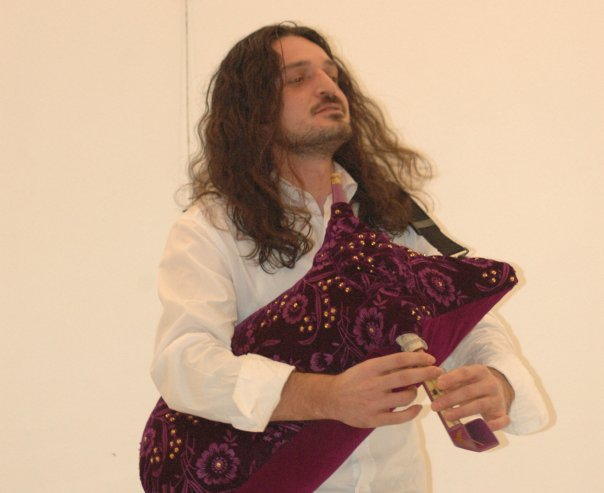
Behçet Gülas, a Hemshin musician, playing the touloum

The touloum is a bagpipe, also played by Laz people and Hemshins. The touloum is also called the askavlos or aggion. It has two melody pipes and no drone pipe, and is played to accompany folk dances. The bag itself is typically made of goatskin or sheepskin, while the two pipes are made of cane. The bagpipe has five fingerholes, some of which may be plugged with wax to achieve different sounds. By manipulating the fingerholes, it is possible for musicians to produce double sounds, so they can play polyphonically. The two melody pipes allow for heterophony. Although the instrument is not very popular among the Pontian diaspora, the touloum is undergoing a revival in Turkey. Some Turkish artists, including Laz and Hemshin musicians, released albums with touloum music in the 2010s and 2020s.

=== Zourna ===
The zourna, also called o petinos (literally "the rooster"), is a double reed woodwind instrument related to the oboe. This instrument is not unique to Pontian music; it is commonly used in folk music from the Balkans to the Indian subcontinent. The zourna comes in various sizes, ranging from 22 to 60 cm (8.7–23.6 in). The zourna has seven airholes, and a thumbhole on which the zournacis (zourna player) places their thumb. The instrument is traditionally played outdoors with daouli accompaniment. A short, high-pitched zourna is known as a pipiza.

=== Ghaval ===
Pontians also play the floghera, also called seliavli or ghaval, a six-hole flute similar to the tin whistle of the British Isles or the bansuri of the Indian subcontinent. When a floghera is not available, Pontian musicians may substitute Celtic duct flutes or Indian bansuris.

=== Other instruments ===
Additionally, Pontians from areas west of Ordu have traditionally played the kemane, the oud, and the violin. The violin, however, is played upright in the musician's lap, as if it were a lyra. Pontians in Georgia may use the accordion rather than the lyra. Vocals are also part of Pontian music. Singers tend to use vibrato. Often, a leader will sing a line, and then a chorus of other singers will repeat that line. Sometimes singers duet with one leading.

== Byzantine period ==
Some Romeika-language Acritic songs date back to the Byzantine Empire and Empire of Trebizond. These songs depict akritai, soldiers who defended the eastern border of the Byzantine Empire. The Acritic songs featured folk heroes such as Digenes Akritas. Acritic songs were first collected in Trabzon in the 1870s. One song, Ton Márandon hartín erthén ("Marandos received a letter"), depicts a legendary soldier named Marandos, who goes to war for seven years and leaves his young wife. Upon his return, his wife fails to recognize him. The homecoming theme is reminiscent of nostos from classic Greek literature.

The Acritic songs offer glimpses into medieval Pontian life. Both Ton Márandon hartín erthén and Akrítas óndes élamnen ("When Akritas plowed") discuss livestock, farming equipment, and traditional farming techniques. The song Akrítas óndes élamnen follows Akrítas, literally "frontiersman," who speaks to a small bird. The bird sits on his ploughshare while he works and sings to him. It says,

Akríta mu, do káthese, do sték'is ke perménis?
To énikó s'ehálasán k'e tin galí's epéran,
k'ólon kalíon t'álogó's stróne k'e kavalkévne.
My Akritas, why are you sitting, what are you still waiting for?
They destroyed your home and they took your wife,
they took your best horse and rode on it.

— Akrítas óndes élamnen, translated by Thede Kahl.

Birds, including the eagle, are a common motif in Pontian folklore. One song, Aitén'ts eperipétanen ("An eagle flew high"), describes an eagle carrying the arm of an unknown soldier in its claws. The fallen soldier himself lies dead on the mountainside. Many Acritic songs from the Pontos are allegorical, referencing struggles against outsiders and conquerors.

Another Acritic song, T'íl' to kástron ("The castle of the sun"), dates from the 1400s. The song is also known as To kástro tis Orĭás ("Beauty's Castle"). The ballad centers on a Byzantine castle with a young woman living inside. Turkish soldiers had tried and failed to take the castle for years. However, a young Pontian who had defected to the Turkish side deceived the people living in the castle into opening the gate.

== Early modern ==
Ioannis Parharidis, a Pontian Greek teacher born in Trabzon in 1858, did field work studying Romeika-language musical traditions around the Black Sea region. In Christian villages near Trapezounta, he found that people sang traditional folk songs. These related to historical events and had a patriotic character. Greek Orthodox Pontians also sang mirologoi, or mourning songs, for the recently deceased.

In the Ophis region, which had a population of Sunni Muslim Romeika speakers, Parharidis found that the locals tended to improvise songs rather than sing well-known folk songs. Additionally, villagers participated in dialogs called atışma, literally meaning "battle of words." During the dialog, two singers joked, argued, and attempted to outsmart one another using rhyming lyrics. Muslim Romeika speakers also sang mirologoi. Their lyrics mixed Romeika and Turkish.

Many Pontian folk songs have survived through to the 21st century. There are a variety of subjects: historical events, warfare, romantic love, fantastic situations, and sorrowful events. Slow, sad songs are known as karslidhika. Some surviving folk songs include I mána en krío neró ("Mother is like cold waster"), a song about mother's love, and Ela poulí m asá makrán ("Come my bird from far away"). There are CD recordings of numerous Pontian folk songs. Some are love songs, such as I kor epien so parhar ("The maid climbed up to the summer pasture") and Páme kór sa kástana ("Let's go gather chestnuts"). Some are traditionally played at weddings, such as Perméno se ("I wait for you"). Still other songs are religious and are sung during various Christian holidays. For example, the song Paschaliátika dísticha ("Easter couplets") references the tradition of dyeing eggs red for Easter.

Some songs were written in response to the Greek genocide and the subsequent population exchange. Some distichs used in parakathi singing also center on the genocide: "Many Romiyi [Greeks] lost their lives on the way to Erzurum. / May these years go away and never come back."

== Folk music in the modern day ==
The Greek Orthodox population of the Pontos had to leave their traditional lands during the Greek genocide and subsequent population exchange in the 1910s and 1920s. Most resettled in Greece. As a result, their musical styles naturally diverged from those of the Muslim Pontic Turks, who remained in the area.

=== In Turkey ===
Some Black Sea Turks speak Romeika and use traditional Black Sea instruments. For example, Merve Tanrıkulu, a Turkish singer from Trabzon, released an original Romeika-language lullaby in 2019. The title is Romeika ninni, literally "Romeika lullaby." Sinan Karlıdağ accompanied her, playing the lyra (Turkish: kemençe). Tanrıkulu told a local news outlet that she recorded the lullaby in order to keep the culture of her region alive. She speaks the highly endangered Ophitic dialect of Romeika.

Apolas Lermi is a singer and guitarist from Trabzon. His birth name is Abdurrahman Lermi, but he goes by the stage name Apolas, for the Greek god of music Apollo. His albums include music in both Turkish and Romeika. Lermi says he received death threats after including Romeika-language songs on his 2011 album Kalandar. He continued to perform music in Romeika afterward. In 2016, Lermi released an album titled Romeika, composed entirely of Pontic Greek songs. He has also performed duets with Greek singers such as Pela Nikolaidou.

=== In the diaspora ===
Some lyra players who emigrated from Pontos during the population exchange went on to record music while in Greece. Many were from Trabzon and the surrounding area. They preserved Pontian musical tradition and publicized it for a larger audience. While the lyra is historically played outdoors, in the 21st century, playing indoors is more common. As a side effect, lyras are becoming larger to produce music that is lower in pitch compared to historical lyras. Modern Pontic music in Greece has been heavily influenced by traditional Greek music styles, such as rebetiko. Some prominent lyra players, such as Giorgos "Gogos" Petridis, also learned to play the bouzouki, which influenced their lyra playing.

Musicians in the diaspora continued to write new songs in Romeika. One such song is Tim batrída'm éxasa ("I lost my homeland"). The song title refers to the sense of loss refugees felt after the population exchange in the early 1920s.

Mían gia álo sin zoí-m so pegádi'm sin avlí'm
Mían gia álo sin zoí-m so pegádi'm sin avlí'm
Nerópon as épina ói ói ói ói ke t'ommáta'm éplina
Nerópon as épina ói ói ói ói ke t'ommáta'm éplina
Once more in my life, in my well, in my yard,
Once more in my life, in my well, in my yard,
I would like to drink some water, oh, and wash my eyes
I would like to drink some water, oh, and wash my eyes

— Chorus of Tim patrida'm exasa, translated by Thede Kahl.

=== Neopontic ===
Since the 1970s, the Neopontiaki genre has emerged, known in English as Neopontic. This Neopontic music emerged from nightclub scenes; it is inspired by Greek, American, and Balkan pop music as well as arabesque. It combines traditional Pontian instruments like the lyra with other instruments, like synthesizers, bouzoukia, drum kits, and electric guitars. Lyrics may be in Romeika, Greek, or both. Scholar Ioannis Tsekouras writes, "Neopontic music is fluidly defined in the negative: whatever is not traditionally Pontic is Neopontic." The term Neopontic has become a catch-all for Pontian music that is not traditional.

== In popular culture ==
Some radio stations play Pontian music.

- Radio Akrites 102.3 FM, based in Thessaloniki, Greece
- Radio Alexios Komninos 105.8, (Note: The name refers to Alexios I Komnenos, a Byzantine emperor) based in Alexandroupolis, Greece
- Radio Lelevose 101.3 FM, (Note: In Romeika, lelevose means "I adore you.") based in Kavala
- Radio Pontos Stockholm, based in Stockholm, Sweden
- Radio Trapezounta, based in Boston, USA

Kostas Ageris, winner of the second season of The Voice of Greece, performed the Romeika song Tim batrída'm éxasa to lyra accompaniment on Greek national television in 2015. Ageris' family is Pontian.

== Notable musicians ==
=== Lyra ===
- Matthaios Tsahouridis (1978–), born in Veria, Greece

=== Composers ===
- Iovan Tsaous (1893–1942), from Kastamonu

=== Singers and songwriters ===
- Stelios Kazantzidis (1931–2001), singer and guitarist, born in Greece to refugee parents from Pontos and Asia Minor
- Chrysanthos Theodoridis (1934–2005), singer-songwriter, born in Greece to a family from Kars
- Apostolos Nikolaidis (1938–1999), born in Greece to refugee parents
- Lefteris Hapsiadis (1953–), songwriter of both traditional and pop music
- Apolas Lermi (1986–), Turkish singer from Trabzon who performs in both Turkish and Romeika

== Bibliography ==
- Kazhdan, Alexander; Talbot, Alice-Mary; Cutler, Anthony; Gregory, Timothy E.; Ševčenko, Nancy P., eds. (1991). The Oxford Dictionary of Byzantium, Volume 1. Oxford University Press. ISBN 9780195046526.
- Michailidis, Nikos (2016). Soundscapes of Trabzon: Music, Memory, and Power in Turkey (PhD). Princeton University.
- Şentürk, Onur (June 2020). "Karadeniz Kemençesinin Yunanistan'daki İcra Geleneği" [Traditional Playing of the Black Sea Fiddle in Greece]. Erdem (in Turkish) (78): 189–212. doi:10.32704/erdem.749159. ISSN 1010-867X.
- Tsekouras, Ioannis (2016). Nostalgia, Emotionality, and Ethno-Regionalism in Pontic Parakathi Singing (PhD). University of Illinois at Urbana-Champaign.
- Tsekouras, Ioannis (October 2022). "Pastures of Love, Mountains of Sacrifice: Ιmaginings of Pontic Homelands in Parakathi Singing and the Postmemory of Trauma". Journal of Modern Greek Studies. 40 (2): 395–423. doi:10.1353/mgs.2022.0027. ISSN 1086-3265.
