= Mevlâna Museum =

Tomb and memorial to the poet Rumi

Mevlana Museum
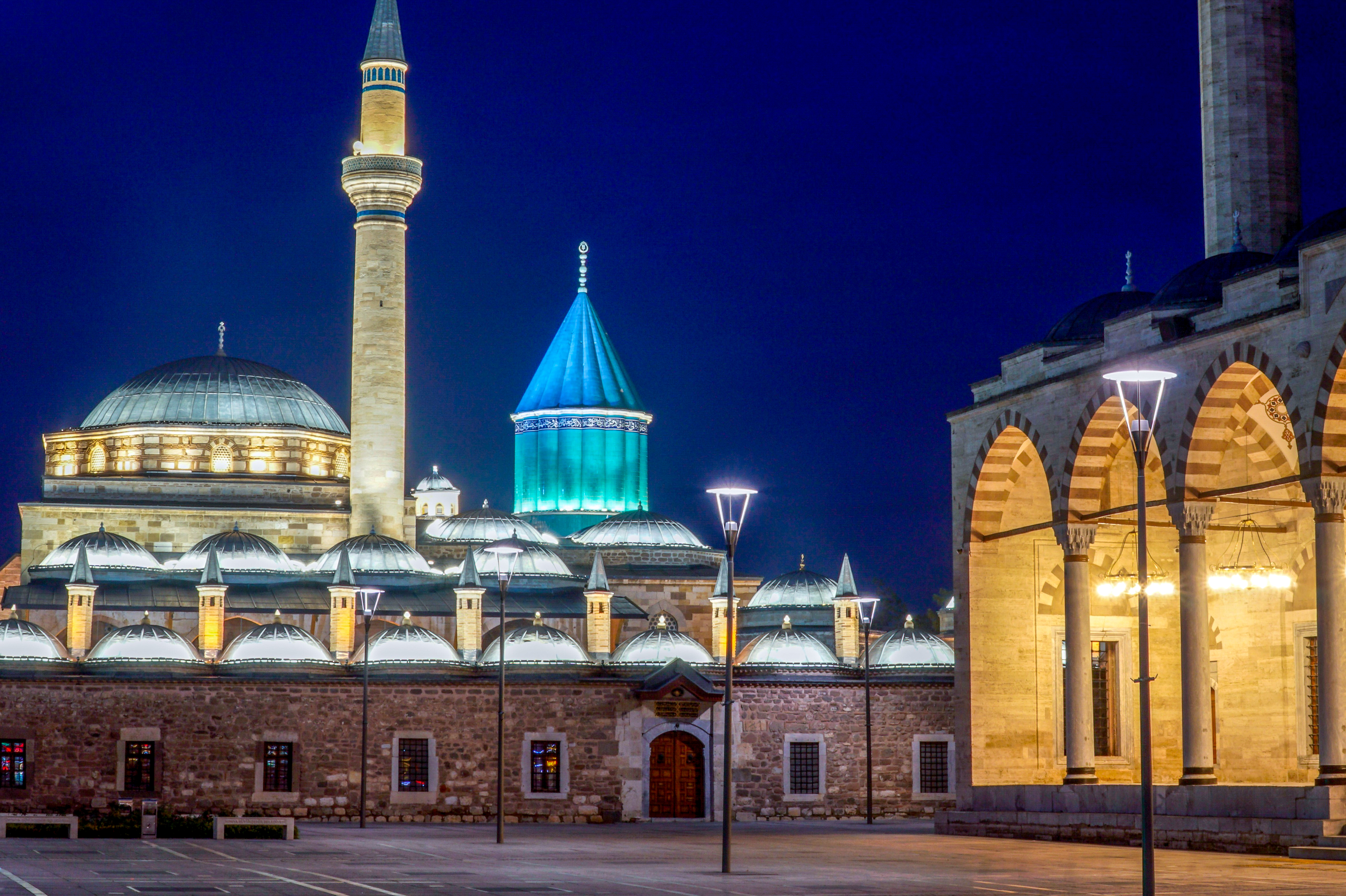
- Mevlana Museum

- Location within Turkey

Religion
- Affiliation: Islam
- Leadership: Imam(s)

Location
- Location: Konya, Turkey
- Administration: Turkish government
- Coordinates: 37°52′14″N 32°30′17″E

Architecture
- Type: Mosque
- Established: Islamic era

Specifications
- Minaret: 1
- Minaret height: 88 m (289 ft)

Website
- www.konya.bel.tr

The Mevlâna Museum (Turkish: Mevlânâ Müzesi), in Konya, Turkey, started life as the dervish lodge (Tekke) of the Mevlevi order, better known as the whirling dervishes. It houses the mausoleum of Jalal ad-Din Muhammad Rumi (Turkish: Celaleddin-i Rumi), an Iranian Sufi mystic.

== History ==
Sultan 'Ala' al-Din Kayqubad, the Seljuk sultan who had invited Mevlâna to Konya, gave his rose garden as a burial place for Rumi's father, Baha' ud-Din Walad (also written as Bahaeddin Veled), who died on 12 January 1231. When Mevlâna died on 17 December 1273 he was buried next to his father.

Mevlâna's successor Hüsamettin Çelebi decided to build a mausoleum (Kubbe-i-Hadra) over the grave of his master. The Seljuk construction, under architect Badr al-Din Tabrizi, was completed in 1274. The construction costs were met by Gurju Khatun, the wife of the Seljuk Emir Suleiman Pervâne, and Emir Alameddin Kayser. The cylindrical drum of the dome originally rested on four pillars. The dome is covered with turquoise tiles.

Additional sections were added to the original complex until 1854. Selimoğlu Abdülvahit decorated the interior and carved the wood for the catafalques.

A decree issued by Atatürk on 6 April 1926 ruled that the mausoleum and the dervish lodge (dergah) must be turned into a museum which duly opened on 2 March 1927. In 1954 it was officially renamed the Mevlâna Museum.

== Description ==
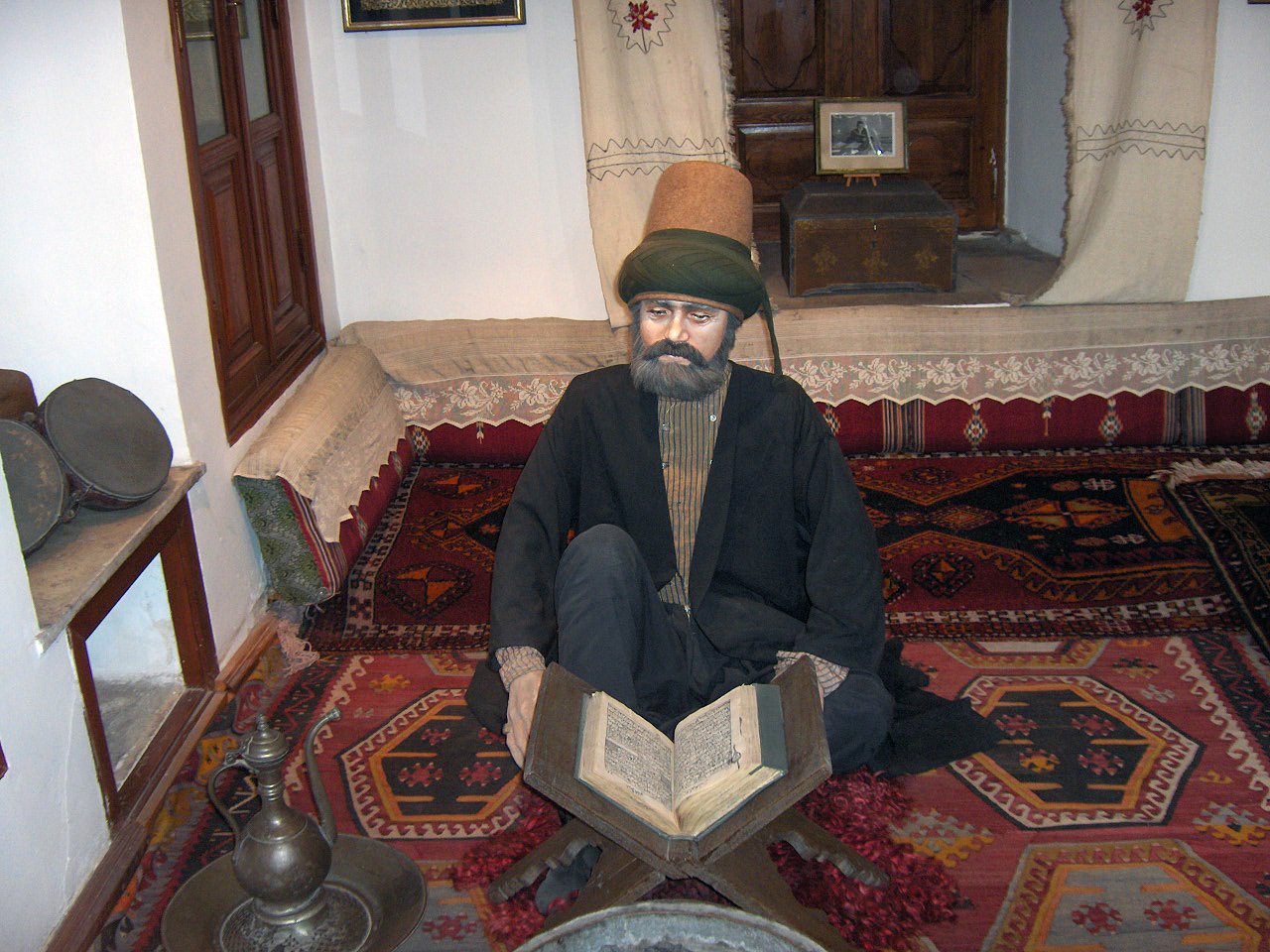
Model of a dervish studying in one of the original tekke cells.

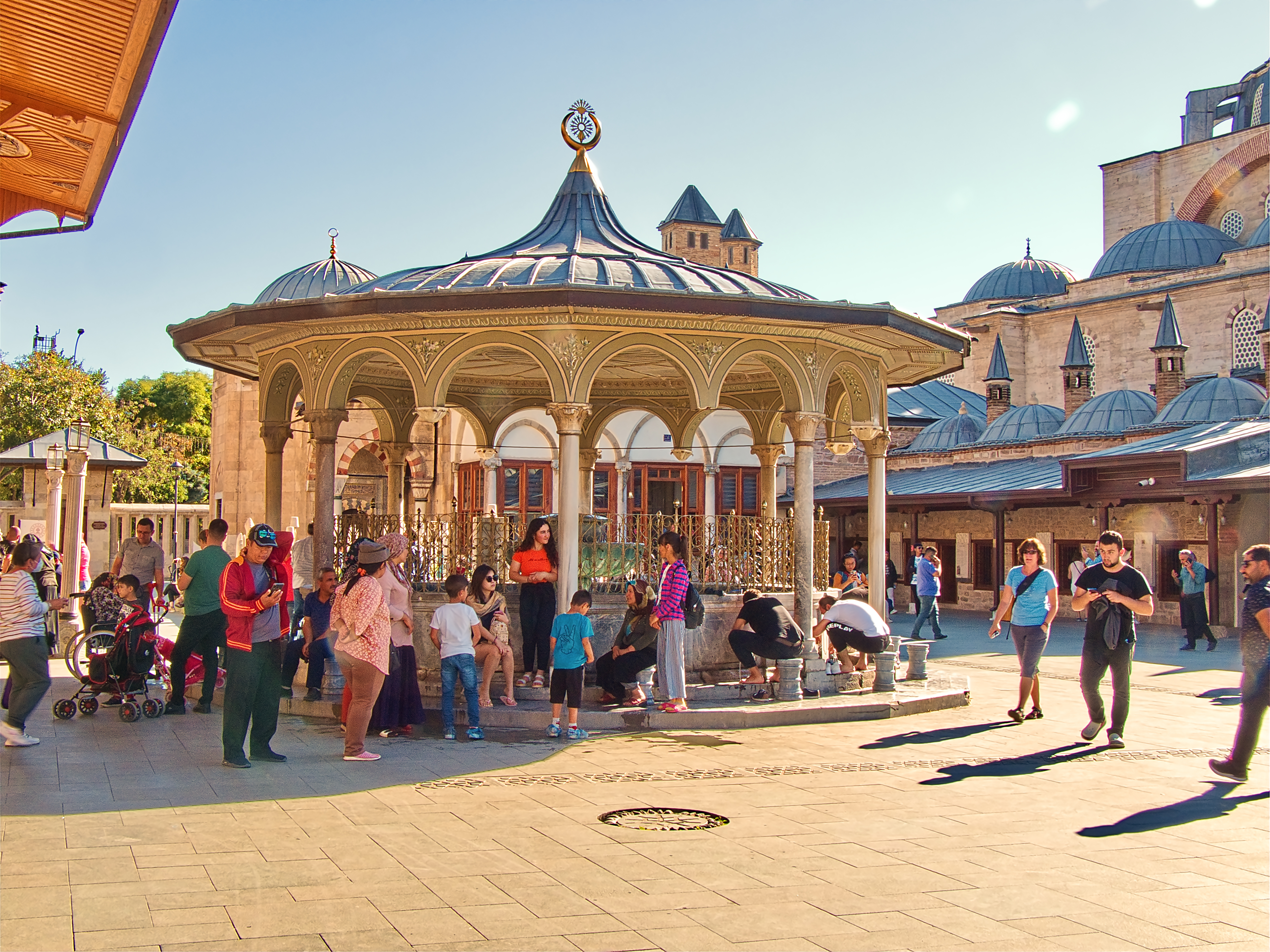
Mevlana Mausoleum Museum courtyard

The main gate (Devisan Kapısı) of the museum leads into a marble-paved courtyard. The dervishes' kitchen (matbah) and the tomb of Hurrem Pasha, built during the reign of Süleyman the Magnificent, stand on the right side. On the left are 17 cells for dervishes, built during the reign of Murad III, each of them covered with a small dome. The kitchen was also used for educating the dervishes and teaching them to perform the sema, the famous whirling ritual. The ṣadirvan (ablutions fountain) in the middle of the courtyard was built in the reign of Yavuz Sultan Selim.

=== Ritual Hall ===
The Ritual Hall (Semahane) was built during the reign of Sultan Süleyman the Magnificent at the same time as the adjoining small mosque. In this hall the dervishes used to perform the Sema, the ritual whirling dance, performed to the rhythm of musical instruments such as the kemence (a small violin with three strings), the kemane (a larger violin), the halile (a small cymbal), the daire (a kind of tambourine), the kudüm (a drum), the rebab (a guitar) and the ney (flute), once played by Mevlâna himself. Examples of these instruments are on display in this room, together with an 18th-century Kirşehir prayer rug, dervish clothing (including Mevlâna's) and four crystal-glass mosque lamps (16th century, Egyptian Mameluk period). In this room there is also a rare Divan-i-Kebir (collection of lyric poetry) from 1366 and two fine specimens of Masnavis (books of poetry written by Mevlâna) from 1278 and 1371.

=== Sarcophagi ===
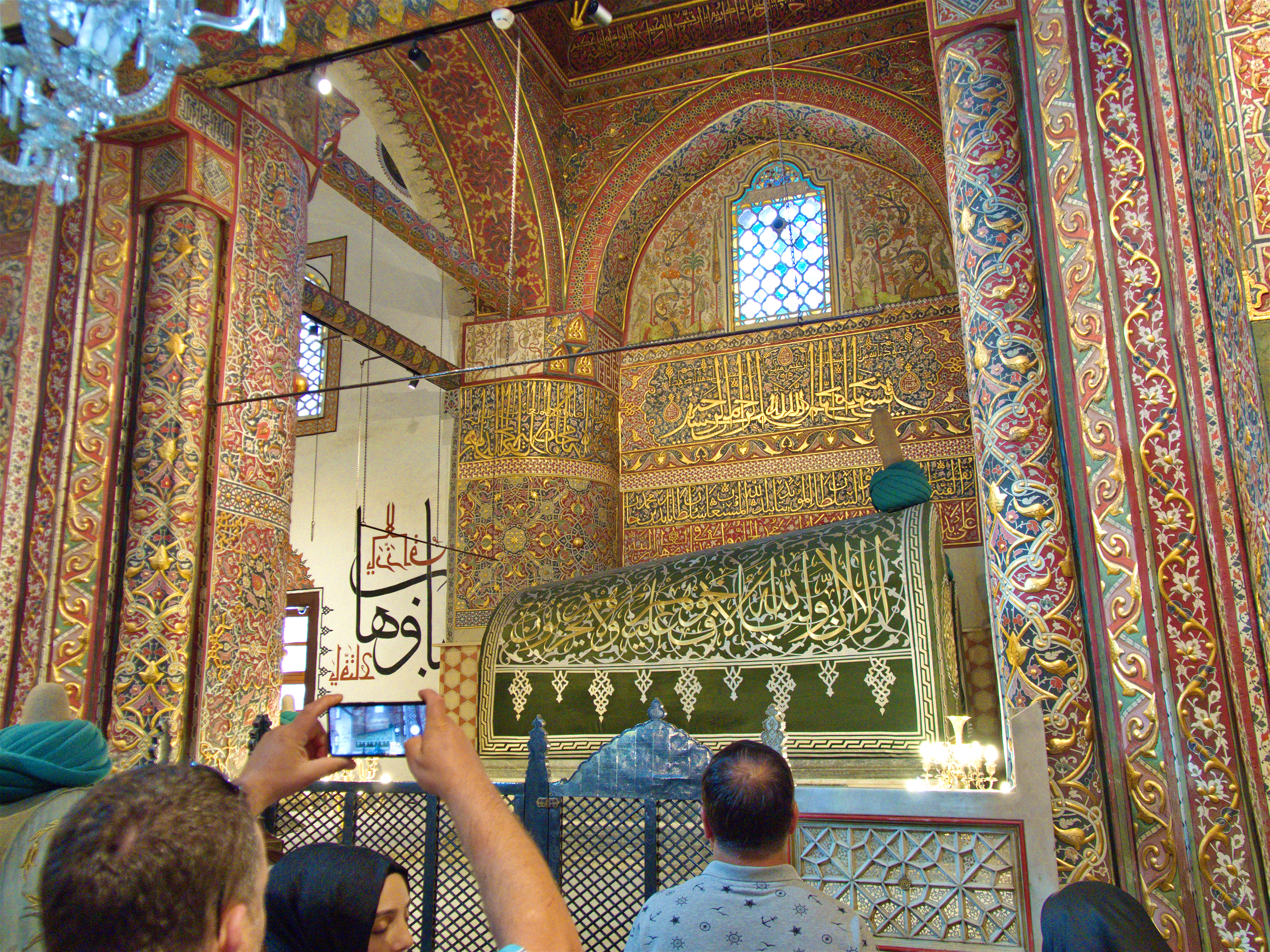
Sarcophagus of Mevlâna, also known as Mevlana's Tomb Inside the Mevlana Museum.

Mevlana's sarcophagus is placed under the turquoise dome (Kibab'ulaktab) that is a symbol of the city, with the actual burial chamber beneath it. It is covered with brocade embroidered in gold with verses from the Koran. This, and all other covers, were a gift of sultan Abdul Hamid II in 1894. Next to Mevlâna's sarcophagus are several others, including those of his father Bahaeddin Veled and his son Sultan Veled. The wooden sarcophagus of Mevlâna, dating from the 12th century, is a masterpiece of Seljuk woodcarving. The silver lattice, separating the sarcophagi from the main chamber, was built by Ilyas in 1579.

=== Mausoleum ===
The Tomb gate (Türbe Kapisi) leads into the mausoleum and the small mosque. Its two doors are decorated with Seljuk motifs and a Persian text from the Mollah Abdurrahman Cami dating from 1492. It leads into the small Tilavet (Chanting) Room (Tilavet Odası) which is decorated with rare Ottoman calligraphy in the sülüs, nesih, and talik styles. In this room the Koran used to be recited and chanted continuously before the mausoleum was turned into a museum.

A silver door leads from the Tilavet Room into the mausoleum. According to an inscription on the door, this was made by the son of Mehmed III in 1599. On the left side six coffins are lined up in rows of three; they belonged to the dervishes (Horasan erler) who came to Konya with Mevlâna and his family from Belkh. Opposite them on a raised platform beneath two domes stand cenotaphs belonging to descendants of the Mevlâna family (his wife and children) and some high-ranking members of the Mevlevi order.

=== Mosque ===
The adjoining small mosque (masjid) is now used to exhibit a collection of old illuminated Korans and valuable prayer rugs. A box, decorated with nacre, is believed to contain the Holy Beard of Muhammad (Sakal-i Ṣerif) .

== Tourism and culture ==
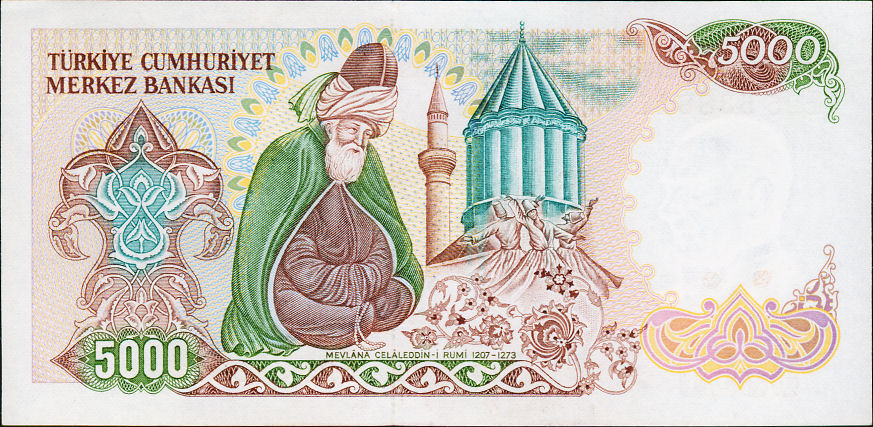
Reverse of the 5000 lira banknote (1981-1994)

The mausoleum was depicted on the reverse of the 5000 lira Turkish banknotes used between 1981 and 1994. It received 3.4 million visitors in 2019, making it Turkey's most visited museum that year.

== Gallery ==
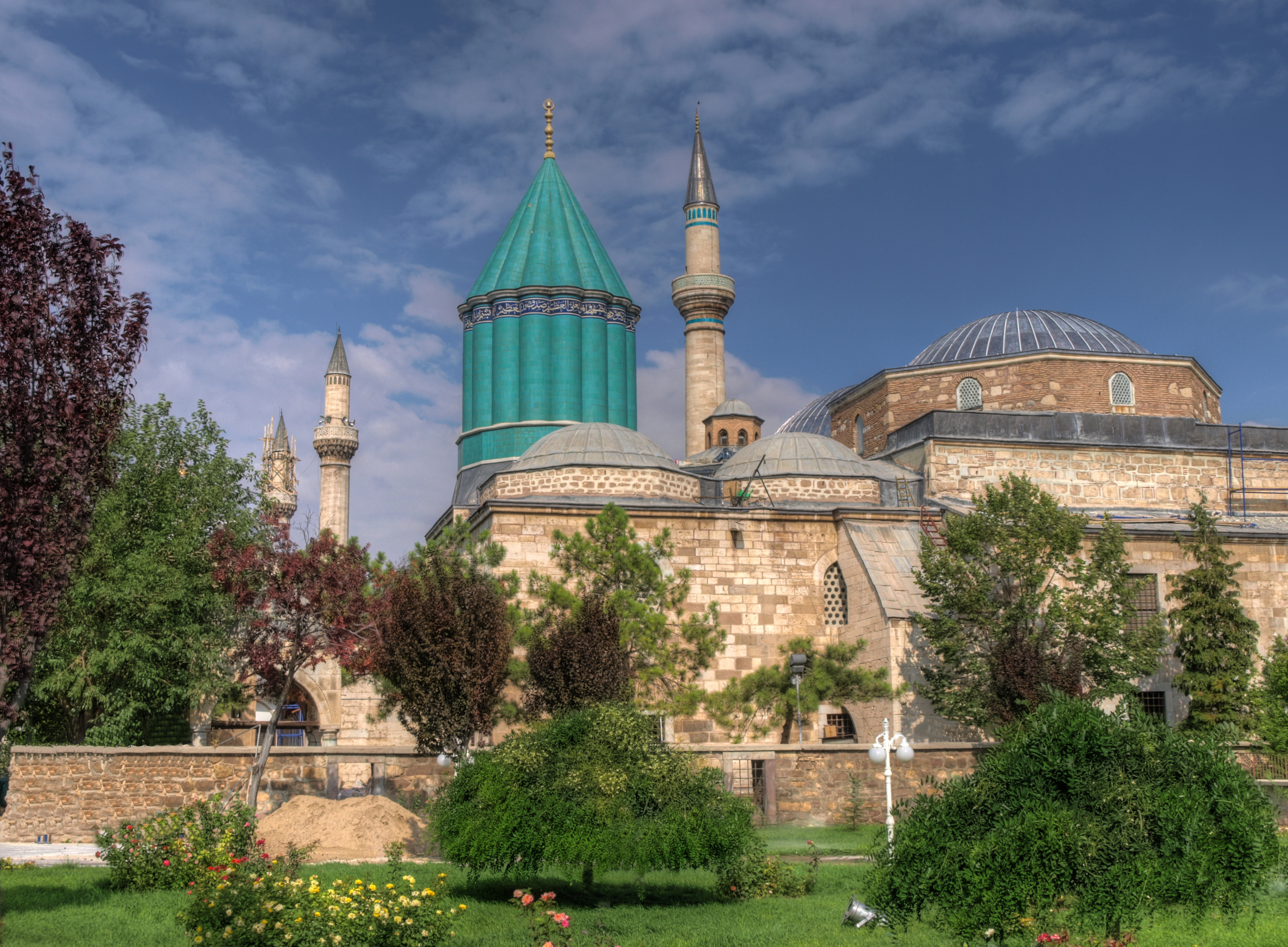
Mevlâna Museum

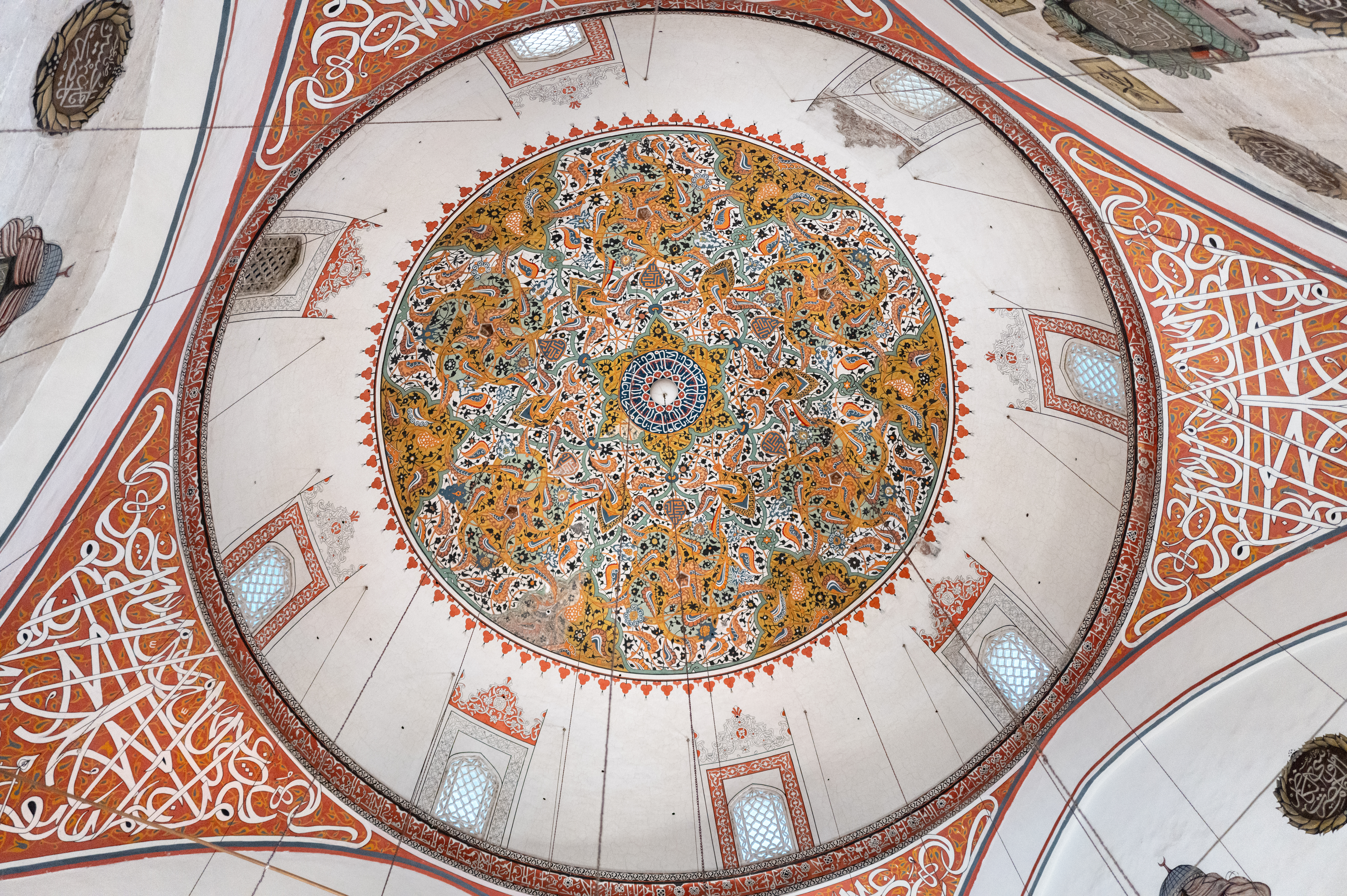
Mevlana Museum Dome

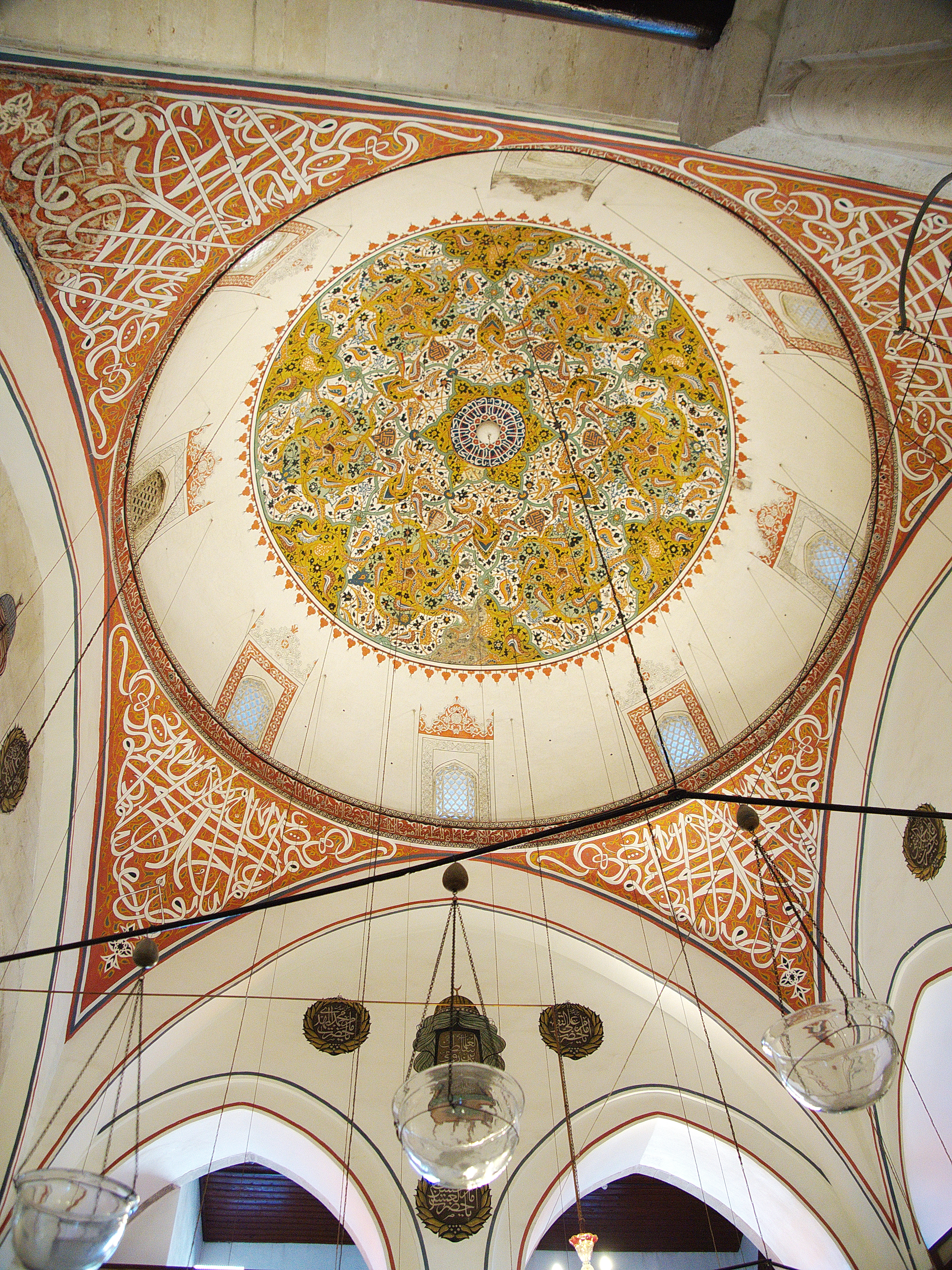
Mevlana Museum Dome

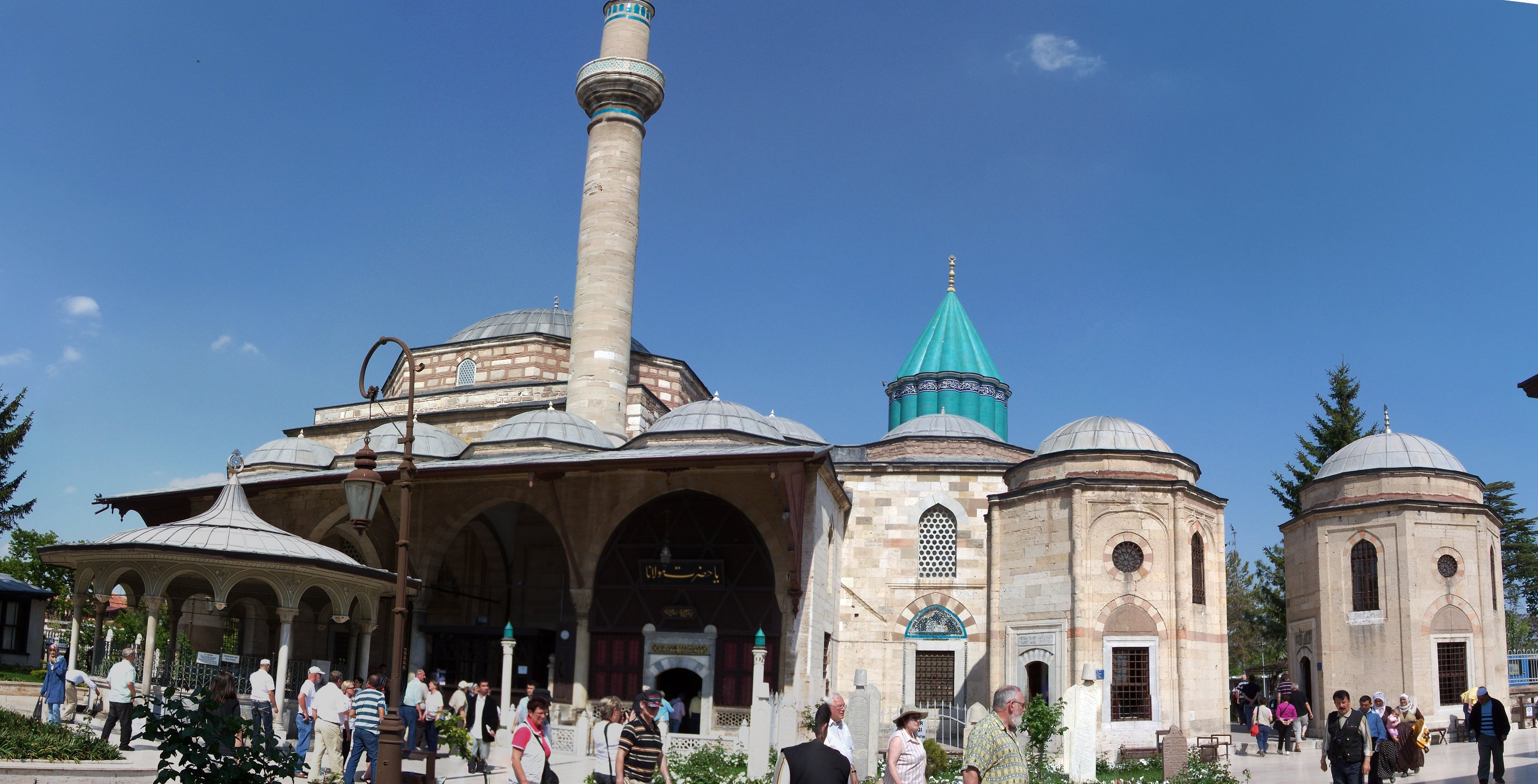
View of the Mevlâna Museum, the şadırvan and the turquoise dome.

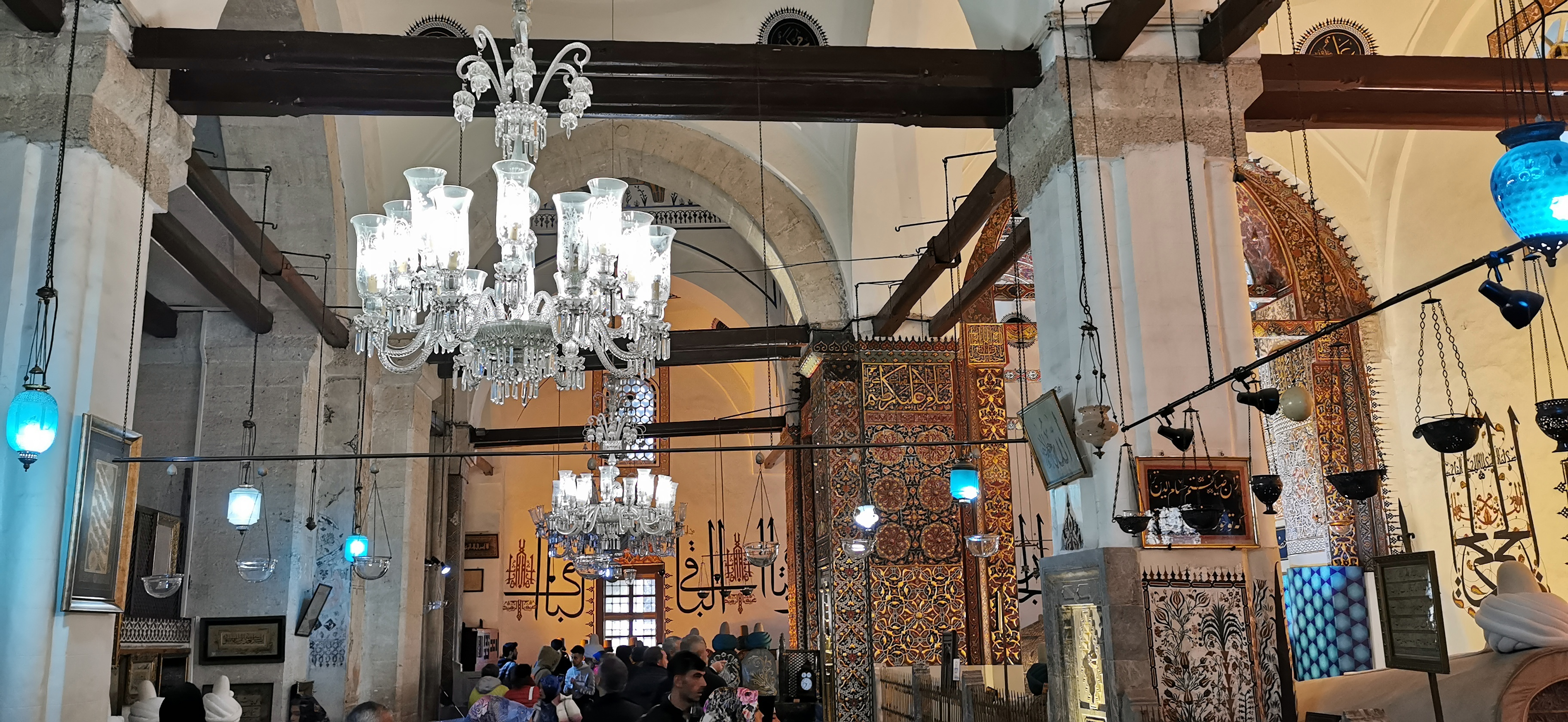
Mevlana Museum Interior

== See also ==
- Rumi
