= Atsiapat =

Atsiapat (Pontic: Άτσιαπατ), also spelt atsapat (Άτσαπατ), is the first in a sequence of three Pontic Greek male dances performed in the region of Pontus, as well as by refugees of Pontos. Atsapat is characterized by short steps and exaggerated movements that resemble stretching. This dance is followed directly by Serra. The final dance in the sequence is the Pyrrhichios.

Atsapat is the Greek pronunciation of the Pontic Turkish city of Akçaabat. The region is famous for the virtuosity of its Pyrrhichios dancers.

== See also ==
- Pyrrhichios
- Korybantes
- Greek dances
- Greek music
