= Pontic Greek folk dance =

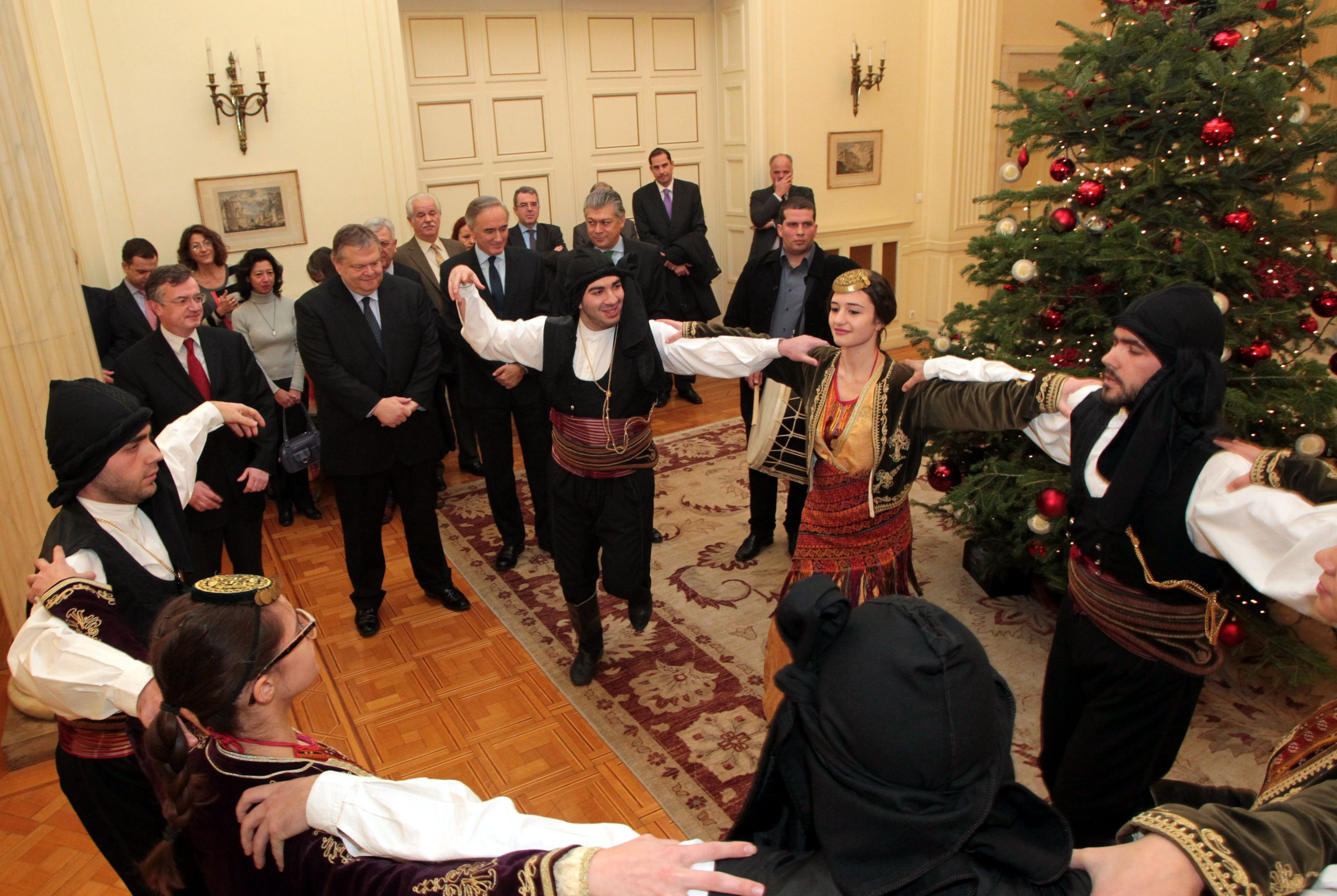
Pontic Greek group performing a dance, likely kotsari

Pontic Greek folk dances are a group of over ninety dances traditionally performed by Pontic Greeks (Pontic: Ρωμαίοι). Dance has been an integral part of Pontian culture since ancient times. Dances vary based on region. Today, few Pontians remain in the Pontus region, but those living in the diaspora worldwide still perform folk dances to preserve their cultural heritage and group identity. Dances are accompanied by traditional music. Some traditional instruments include the lyra, daouli, zurna, dankiyo, tulum, and oud. The instrumental music may or may not be accompanied by singing.

All dances are traditionally performed in lines or circles with participants linking hands. The circle may shrink and expand during the dance, or it may move clockwise or counterclockwise. Pontic Greek dances can be distinguished from other types of Greek dance because of their unique style. Pontian dances are characterized by shoulder tremors, abrupt pauses, synchronized arm swinging, knee bends, and precise steps. Shimmying—the flexion and rotation of the torso—is also characteristic of Pontian dance. Some dances are only performed by women, others only by men; many dances can be performed by both.

== History and origin ==
=== Ancient times ===
Modern Pontian Greek dances integrate many elements of Ancient Greek, Byzantine, Laz, Caucasian (including Armenian), and Turkish dances. Some have their origins in ancient Greek dances from the 8th century BC, such as the ancient Pyrrhichios or Pyrrhic dance.

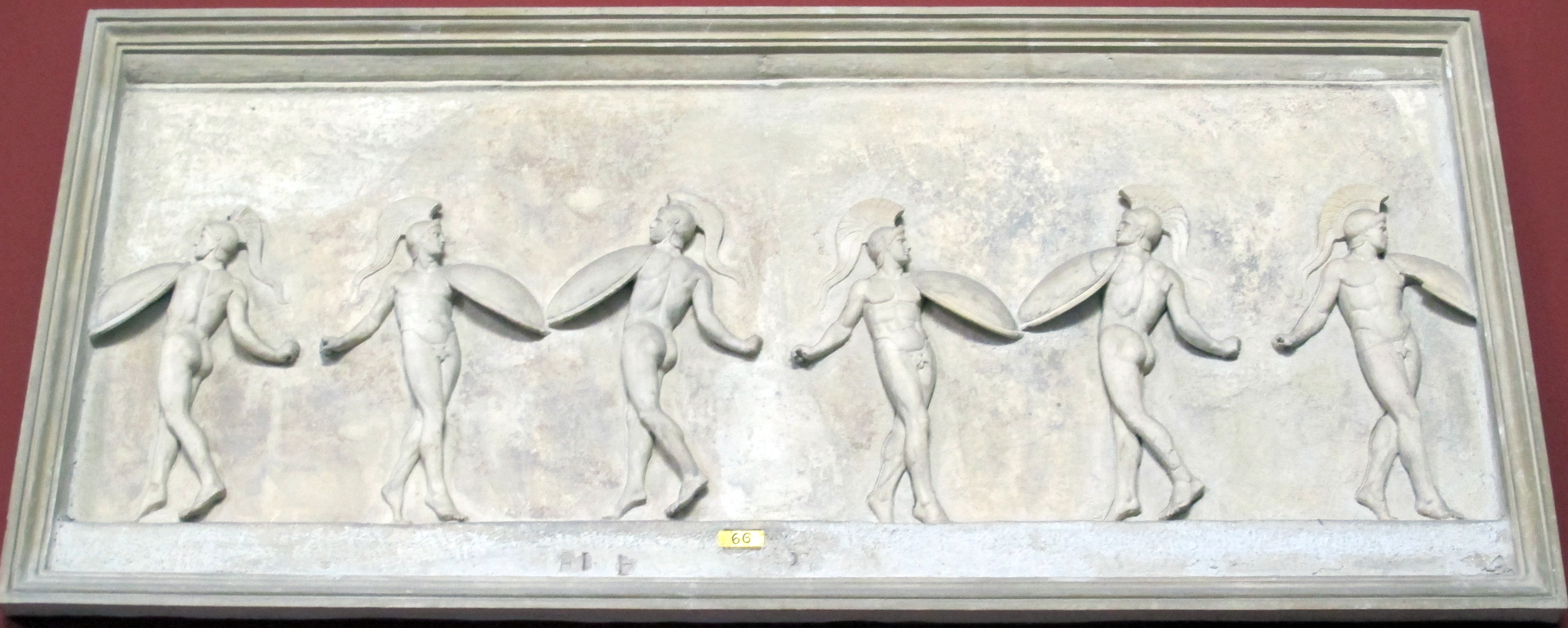
Pyrrhichios dance in ancient art, Vatican Museums.

=== Early modern ===
Most Pontians today live in Greece. Their ancestors came to Greece as refugees fleeing the violence in the late Ottoman Empire or as exchangees following the Greek-Turkish population exchange. Some dances were permanently lost during the Greek genocide. Despite originating from many different parts of the Pontos and having a variety of different cultural traditions, Pontian refugees in Greece banded together and eventually formed a shared cultural identity as Pontian Greeks. Shared dances became a way for Pontians to remember and preserve their history. It was believed that performing dances like the kotsari could ward off evil spirits, making them not only a form of expression but also a dance of protection.

=== Modern day ===
Pontian traditional dances have been incorporated into gym classes at Greek public schools. In addition, dancers performed Pontian dances at the closing of the 2004 Olympic Games in Athens. Dances are also performed by a variety of troupes at the yearly Panayía Soumelá festivities; every year on August 15, Greek Orthodox Pontians gather at a monastery in the Vermio Mountains to celebrate Mary.

Many Pontic Greek dance groups exist worldwide in the diaspora. According to one Pontic Greek man living in Melbourne, "every Pontian club had a dancing group." Today, some dances may be performed to Western instruments like guitars and drum kits. Dance is essential to Pontian life and occurs at almost all major events. Pontians dance at large dinners, at weddings, at wedding receptions, to celebrate birthdays, to celebrate upcoming marriages, at Greek festivals, at religious festivals, and during commemorative events. Dance is strongly connected to emotion, group identity, and group memory as Pontians. Anthropologist Valerie Liddle argues that Pontians also dance to commemorate the loss of their former home in Pontos.

== Types ==
Styles of music and dance vary based on the region. A dance traditionally performed in a rural village of the Pontic Alps in Gümüşhane Province would be very different from a dance traditionally performed in coastal Trapezunta, for example. Beyond that, there are a variety of dance styles. Dances performed by women and men may vary. Some dances, such as the serra, are vigorous and fast-paced. Others, such as the omal monon, have a slower, more even pace. Rhythm may vary based on region and dance group.

== Grips ==
Dances are typically performed by a group of people linking their hands or touching one another's arms in some way. The grips vary based on dance and performers. Some grips include:

- "W" grip (Dancers clasp hands with elbows bent)
- "T" grip (Dancers lay their hands on one another's shoulders, as in kotsari)
- "V" grip (dancers hold hands without bending elbows)

== List ==
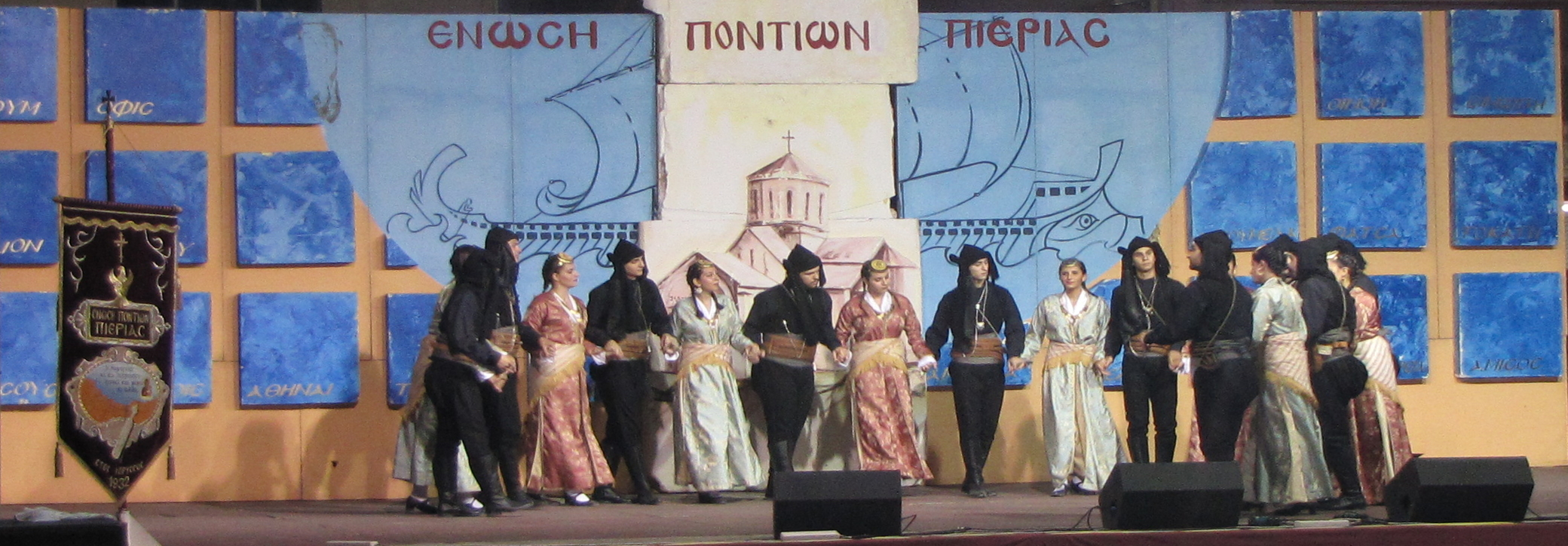
Enosi Pontion Pierias, Pontian dance group in Greece, performing a mixed dance

=== Tik dances ===
Tik is a class of fourteen mixed dances. Dances may be performed in 5/8, 7/16, or rarely 2/4 meter. Tik is a Romeika word, borrowed from Turkish, meaning "upright" or "brave."

- Tik diplon ("double tik"), a 10-step dance originally from Kars, danced counterclockwise. Participants link hands and bend their arms at the elbows in the "W" grip. The dance is mixed, performed by both women and men. The dance is also called tik so gonaton (tik of the knee) because the knee bends during the dance. It is always danced to music with vocals. The instruments can include the lyra, dankiyo, zurna, tulum, kemane, or oud; it can also be accompanied by Western instruments such as the violin, flute, and clarinet. The meter is 5/8 and the tempo is 300-384 bpm, although this can vary; in one study, tik diplon was danced to 70 bpm. It has a distinctive style with repeated, rhythmic bends of the knee, hence the name. This is the most common tik variant danced today.
- Varyn tik ("heavy tik") is a variety from Akdağmadeni. It is slow compared to some varieties, with a tempo of 214 bpm. The dance is typically accompanied by zurna music. It is danced in 5/8 meter.
- Varyn monon tik is a simpler variety of Varyn tik, with fewer steps.
- Tik monon ("single tik") is a variety from Bafra.
- Tik lagefton ("jumping tik") is a variety that includes a jump on the second step. The meter is 5/8 and the tempo is 300-384 bpm. It is similar to the dance tiki from Şebinkarahisar.
- Tik of Matsouka is a lively dance with small jumps. The meter is 5/8 and the tempo is 300-384 bpm.
- Tik monon of Trapezounta is a slow dance with short movements. The meter is 2/4 and the tempo is 90 bpm.
- Shyton is a variety of tik monon from Imera, a village near Trabzon. It is danced clockwise, unlike most varieties. The meter is 5/8 and the tempo is 263 bpm.
- Apo pan ke kan ("from up and down") is a variety from Matsouka. It involves only basic steps. Rather than linking hands with elbows bent, participants link hands with their arms crossed behind their backs. In this way, a participant links hands with the second dancer from them rather than the person immediately next to them. The meter is 5/8 and the tempo is 263 bpm.
- Atsiapat or Atschapat, from the town of Akçaabat, is a unique dance. It is a men's dance or mixed dance (depending on region) that involves a slight repeated bending of the trunk. Hands move up and down throughout the dance. The meter is 7/16, and the tempo is 400 bpm. The is generally accompanied by a number of traditional instruments, including the daouli and Pontic lyra.
- Tik tromachton, Titireme, or Ti Lazias is a very fast-paced dance with only three steps (or, in some cases, "a sharp step followed by trembling"). It is performed across Pontos to different names with slight variations in the steps. It usually accompanies music without singing. The meter is 7/16, and the tempo is 500-580 bpm.
- Kousera, another variety from Matsouka, combines aspects of both the tik tromachton and the tik monon. The meter is 2/4 and the tempo is 164 bpm.
- Tsourtoughouzous is a variety from the area around Gümüşhane. The tempo varies throughout the song. It is a lively dance performed in a closed circle with much stamping of the feet. The meter is 2/4 and the tempo is 125 bpm.
- Tik lazias hails from the villages around Akdağmadeni. This is a male dance. Unlike in most Pontic dances, the dancers don't touch; instead, each dancer raises his right hand while keeping his left hand behind his waist. The dancers still form a closed circle as if linked. The meter is 7/16 and the tempo is around 500 bpm.
- The tsakomata or serra (not to be confused with the men's war dance serra, detailed below) is a men's dance widespread across Pontos. The dance was performed in a closed circle, and one dancer was the leader who would call out phrases to signal different motions. Most Pontian dances don't have a leader. There are many names and varieties for this dance. The meter is 7/16 and the tempo is 500-580 bpm.

=== Omal dances ===
Omal is another class of mixed dances. In Romeika, omal means "regular" or "smooth," as the dances have simple steps without much jumping or stomping.

- Omal monon, or omal aplon, is a simple dance with 6 steps. Dancers link their hands in the "W" grip and stand in a closed circle. The musical accompaniment varied based on the region.
- Omal diplon
- Omal garasaris, or the Kars omal, is danced in a 2/4 meter with a tempo of 104 bpm. It is a mixed dance. Dancers hold hands and bend their elbows in the "W" grip.
- Omal kounichton
- Omal trapezountas, or dipat, is a variety from Trapezounta with a meter of 9/8. The tempo is 120 bpm. Dancers use the "W" grip. It is a relaxed, slow dance with small steps.

=== Serra and related dances ===
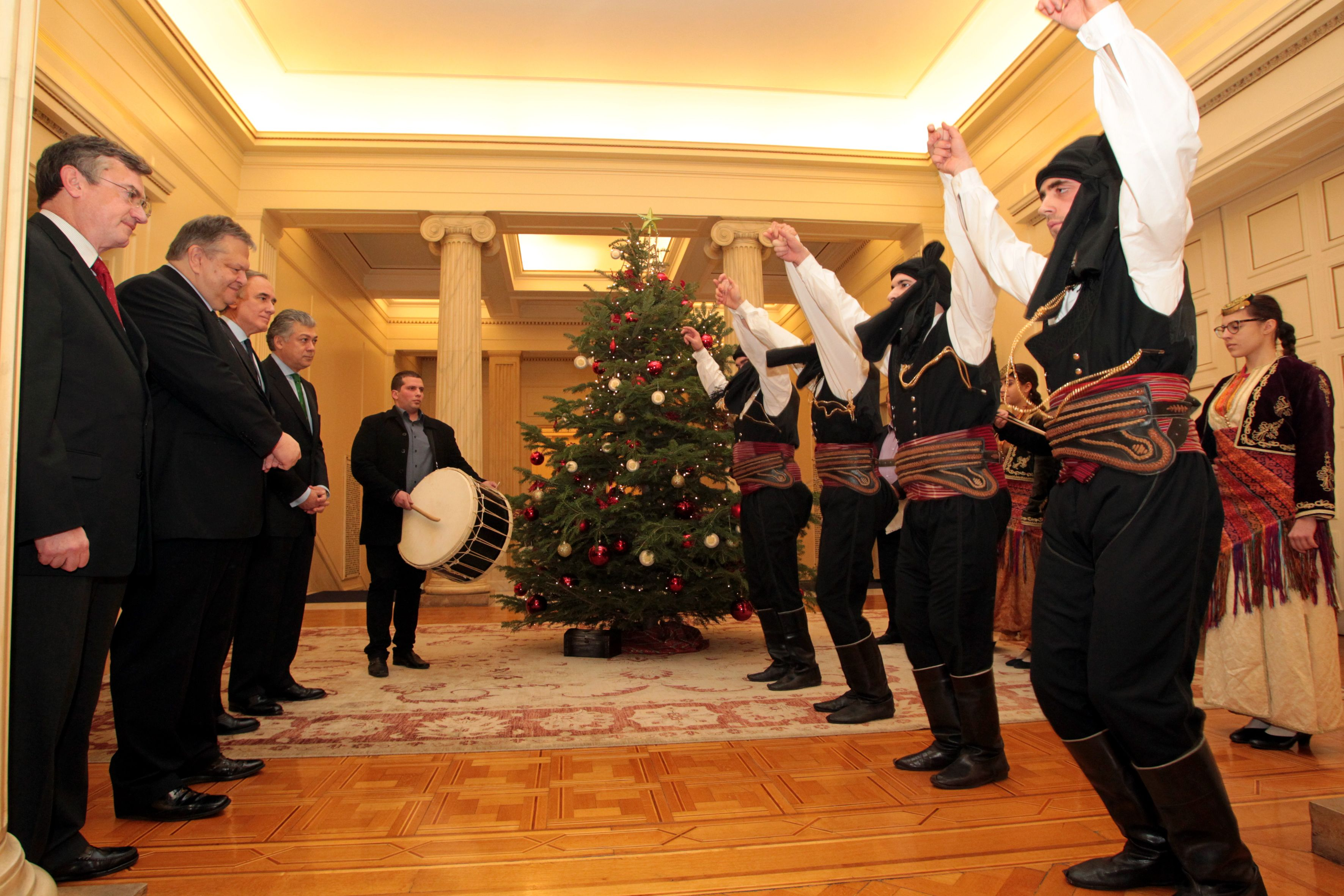
Pontians performing a dance, probably serra, during a Christmas celebration at the Ministry of Foreign Affairs in Greece

- Atsiapat (Ατσαπάτ), a version of the serra dance originating in the town of Akçaabat, Trabzon Province. The atsiapat is generally accompanied by the daouli (drum) and Pontic lyra. In Akçaabat, only men performed the dance; in the Matzouka region, both women and men performed it.
- Syrtos, a dance with musical and vocal accompaniment. This is also a war dance; the lyrics of the accompanying song described a battle.
- Horon (dance) is the Turkish word for the serra dance, from the Romeika horoi meaning "dance". Many Pontic Turks, whose ancestors lived side by side with the Pontic Greeks, still perform the horon.
- Serra (dance), also called pyrrichios, is a dynamic men's dance. It likely descends from an Ancient Greek war dance, the Pyrrhichios. Although danced at celebrations, it maintains the characteristics of a war dance. Mouzenidis, writing for the Greek periodical Pontiaki Estia in 1956, argued that the serra represents a fight almost lost. The first phase of dance represents a joyous people, the second represents an injured fighter, and the third represents a redemption. The dance starts slow in the first phase. In the second phase, the dance quickens pace and becomes uneasy, as the dancers mimic injured fighters, tremble, and drop to their knees. At the last phase of the dance, the dancers rise up again, heads and hands held high. It is danced in sequence with other dances, including the syrtos and atsiapat. Although it evolved from a war dance, in more recent times it is typically performed at celebrations. In 2022, thanks to the research of Pontian Greek scholar Alexia Ioannidou, the serra was included in Greece's National Index of Intangible Cultural Heritage.

=== Other dances ===
- Apo pan ke ka, tik variant, from Akdağmadeni
- Armatsouk of Kars
- Arxoulamas/Ikeleme of Bafra
- Chyton
- Diplo kots
- Ekativa sa Paksides of Trapezounta
- Empropis is danced in 9/8 with a tempo of 138 bpm. It is a quick dance utilizing small steps.
- Etere of Trapezounta
- Fona of Trapezounta, Gümüşhane
- Gemoura of Imera, Trapezounta, and Sanda in Gümüşhane
- Getiere of Gümüşhane
- Giovalantum of Akdağmadeni
- Isaiah dance, part of a traditional Pontian wedding. The bride and groom perform this dance around a small table during the church ceremony.
- Kalon korits (lit. "good girl") from Trapezounta
- Kara Punar of Bafra
- Karsilamas, performed in Akdağmadeni and Gümüşhane
- Kavazitas of Kerasunta
- Kelkit of Gümüşhane
- Kers gumusmaden
- Kizela/aneforitsa of Trapezounta
- Kizlar oplamasi of Bafra
- Kizlar kaitesi of Bafra
- Kotchangel, a farewell dance
- Kots
- Kotsari is a mixed dance, shared with Armenians, that originates from the Kars region in eastern Pontos. It is danced in 2/4 with a tempo of 138 bpm. Participants lay their hands on one another's shoulders in a "T" grip. The dance has 8 steps.
  - Tria ti kotsari, an energetic Kars variant
- Kotsihton, an omal variant from Kerasunta
- Kounichton of Nikopolis
- Kousera of Matzouka
- Lafragka or Lafranga is a dance similar to the kochari. It is a mixed dance performed in a closed circle. Dancers link up using the T grip. The lafranga moves to the right, has 6 steps, and is performed in either 2/4 or 4/8 meter. There is no vocal accompaniment, but many different instruments can accompany the dance. It originated in Sampsunta and was also danced by Pontic refugees from Samsun in Almaty, Kazakhstan.
- Letsi of Kars
- Letsina or Letsina Kars is a dance from Eastern Pontos. It is a fast-paced, mixed dance with 16 steps performed in a closed circle. Dancers link their hands in the V grip; they swing their hands back and forth and hold them above their heads at different points in the dance. There is no vocal accompaniment, although there may be many different instruments accompanying the dance. Letsina is performed in 7/8 meter.
- Mandilia of Gümüşhane
- Maxera or maheria of Kars, meaning "knives," a dance incorporating knife play.
- Milon kokkinon ("red apples") of Akdağmadeni
- Militsa, "little apple"
- Miteritsa of Trapezounta, a sort of couple's dance representing unattainable love
- Momogeria custom - a festive dance performed at Lent and to ring in the New Year
- Montzonos of Kars
- Moscof, a vigorous, fast-paced dance
- Mouzenitikon of Gümüşhane
- Omalin of Nikopolis
- Osman Agas of Bafra
- Outsai/Outsain/Outsa Aiax/Outsagun of Nikopolis
- Papor
- Piçak Oyünü, a knife dance. Two men holding knives face each other and improvise a dance in which they mime a knife fight.
- Pipilomatena, also called patoula, is a mixed dance originating from Gümüşhane but performed throughout Pontos. Dancers use the "T" grip, laying their arms across one another's shoulders. Women and men alternate: if the first dancer in the line is a woman, the next will be a man, the next after him will be a woman, and so on. The dance is fast-paced with many movements of the knee. The word pipilomatena means a woman with small eyes (literally "seed eyes"). The dance can be performed to the song pipilomatena, which describes a woman with small, soft eyes; alternatively, the phrase can refer to a woman with eyes the color of almonds or hazels. The dance's other name, patoula, is slang for a plump, pale woman. A full-figured woman with white skin was seen as the ideal of female beauty in the Pontos in the early 20th century.
- Podaraki
- Sampson of Sampsunta. The dancers keep their legs straight and move swiftly from side to side, creating a particular bounce.
- Sari kouz of Trapezounta, meaning "blond girl"
  - Sari kouz bafras
- Seranitsa or Armenitsa ("little widow" or "little Armenian") is a mixed dance performed in 2/4 with a tempo of 120 bpm. It is relatively slow; dancers make small steps with their hands linked in the V grip. There are 16 steps, and the dance moves to the right. It originates from the town of Cheriana in the area around Gümüşhane. The seranitsa is also called the ekosi enan ("twenty-one"). There are two different theories on how the name came about: some say that the steps form the number 21 on the floor during the dance, while others say that the dance originally had 21 rather than 16 steps.
- Syrtos
- Taratsou Sokaklar of Bafra
- Tas, a partner dance from the Caucasus
- Tamzara of Trapezounta
- Tek kaite of Bafra
- Ters from Akdağmadeni
- Ti Lazias of Akdağmadeni
- Tik argon of Akdağmadeni
- Tiki of Nikopolis, similar to the Tik lagefton.
- Titara of Kars and Gümüşhane
- Tiz from Akdağmadeni (Tiz leilum gar)
- Topalaman of Bafra
- To thymisma, a wedding dance from Kromi, Trapezounta, and Kars
- Touri of Kars
- Tournala of Kars
- Tripat of Trapezounta
- Tromachton ("trembling") of Trapezounta
- Trygona ("turtledove"), performed in both Kerasounda and Trapezounta. Trygona is also a folk song about an unhappy married couple.
  - Trygona Matsoukas, of the Matzouka region
- Kori Kopela, a variation on the pipilomatena from the banks of the Galyan Stream near Trapezounta.
- Tyrphon of Bafra
- Tsarahot from Akdağmadeni
- Tsiourtougouzous of Gümüşhane
- Xalai of Akdağmadeni
- Xala-xala of Gümüşhane
- Yedi ara
- Yetire
- Yuvarladum

== Bibliography ==
- Georgoulas, Renee; Southcott, Jane (2015). "A case study of a Greek Australian traditional dancer: Embodying identity through musicking". Victorian Journal of Music Education. 1: 9–17.
- Liddle, Valerie (2016). "Pontic dance: Feeling the absence of homeland". In Hemer, Susan R.; Dundon, Alison (eds.). Emotions, Senses, Spaces: Ethnographic Engagements and Intersections (PDF). University of Adelaide Press. pp. 49–65. ISBN 9781925261271.
- Tyrovola, Vasiliki; Karepidis, Ioakeim K.; Kardaris, Dionysios G. (September 30, 2007). ""Ποντιακοί Χοροί": Παρελθόν και Παρόν Δομική-Μορφολογική και Τυπολογική Προσέγγιση" ["Pontic Dances": Past and Present Structural-Morphological and Typological Approach]. Inquiries in Sport and Physical Education (in Greek). 5 (2): 240–263. ISSN 1790-3041.
- Vavritsas, Nikolaos; Moisidis, Kyriakos; Vavritsas, Georgios (January 2014). "The Pontic dance 'Tik'. Ethnographic and rhythmic element". Research in Dance Education. 15 (1). Taylor & Francis: 83–94. doi:10.1080/14647893.2012.721761. ISSN 1464-7893.
- Zografou, Magna; Pipyrou, Stavroula (2011). "Dance and Difference: Toward an Individualization of the Pontian Self". Dance Chronicle. 34 (3). Taylor & Francis: 422–446. doi:10.1080/01472526.2011.615235. ISSN 0147-2526.
