= Dipat =

Greek spiritual dance

Dipat is a Greek spiritual dance. It is the second-most popular Pontian dance, behind only the Horon.

== See also ==
- Greek dances
- Greek music
