= Horon =

Turkish folk dance

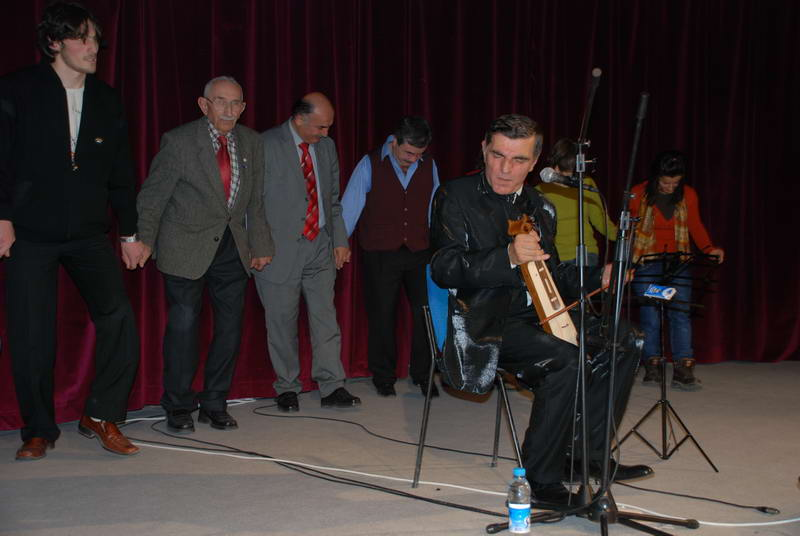
Horon with kemenche

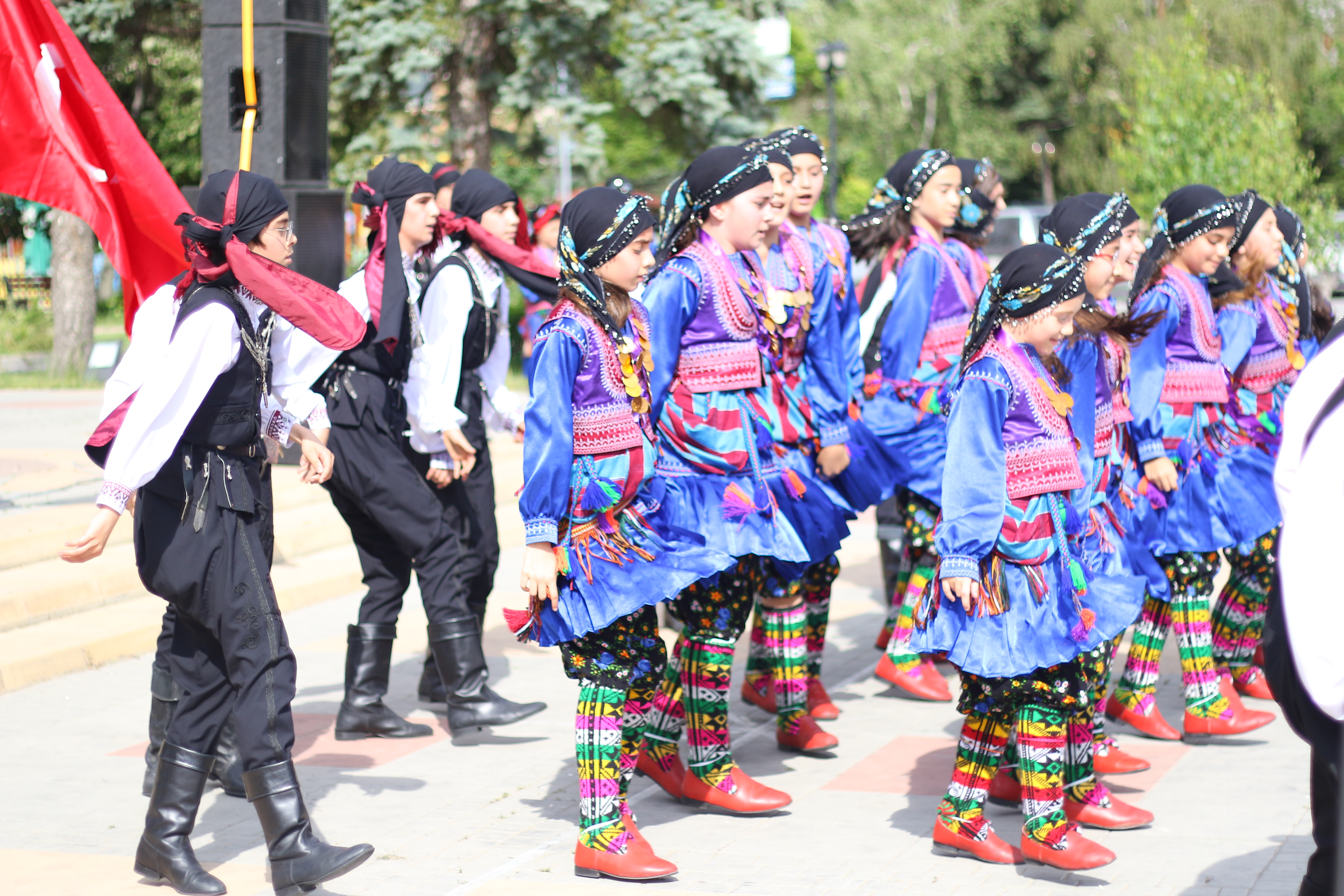
Children from Turkey perform folk dance

Horon (Pontic: χορόν, romanized: khorón) is a group of traditional folk dances from the Eastern Black Sea Region in Turkey.

== Name ==
=== Etymology ===
The term horon derives from Greek choros (Greek: χορός, romanized: khorós, see chorus), which means "dance." The earliest instance of its usage in a Turkic language is in Codex Cumanicus from 1303.

In the provinces of Ordu and Giresun, the term horan is used instead of horon.

=== Variants ===
Over 50 variations of horon have been identified in a single region.

== Distribution ==
=== Anatolia ===
In The Black Sea Region from the border of Samsun to Georgian border, this dance is performed often in weddings, engagement ceremonies, highland festivals, military send-off ceremonies with kemenche, clarinet, tulum (bagpipe), alongside with davul-zurna. Depending on the variation, the dance may be performed by only mens (male horon), only womans (girl horon), mixed male-female groups (karma horon). The music is either accompanied by türkü, or with just instrumental accompany.

== Origin ==
Horon or horonu is the Turkish equivalent of the serra war dance of the Pontian Greeks, resembling the ancient Greek Pyrrhic armed dance.

== Dance ==
The horon is typically performed by a group of men or women in a line or semicircle. This dance form involves fast shoulder shimmy (Greek: Τρέμουλο, tremoulo), trembling of the entire body, and sudden squats. Horon dances require speed and agility in a dancer.

== See also ==
Associated category

- Pontic Greek folk dance
- Laz folk music

Similar dances

- Dabke, Levantine folk dance
- Khigga, Assyrian folk dance
- Tamzara, folk dance from the Armenian Highlands
