= Letsina =

Letsina (Pontic: Λετσίνα), also called Letsina Kars, is a Pontic Greek folk dance. Pontian refugees from Turkey brought the dance to Greece. The Letsina also exists in the Caucasus region.

The dance comes from eastern Pontus, particularly Kars Province. The dance is co-ed; both women and men perform it. Pontians dance the Letsina to a 7/8 rhythm. Like most Pontic dances, the Letsina is performed hand-by-hand, with dancers either in a circle or line.
