= Apolas Lermi =

Turkish singer (born 1986)

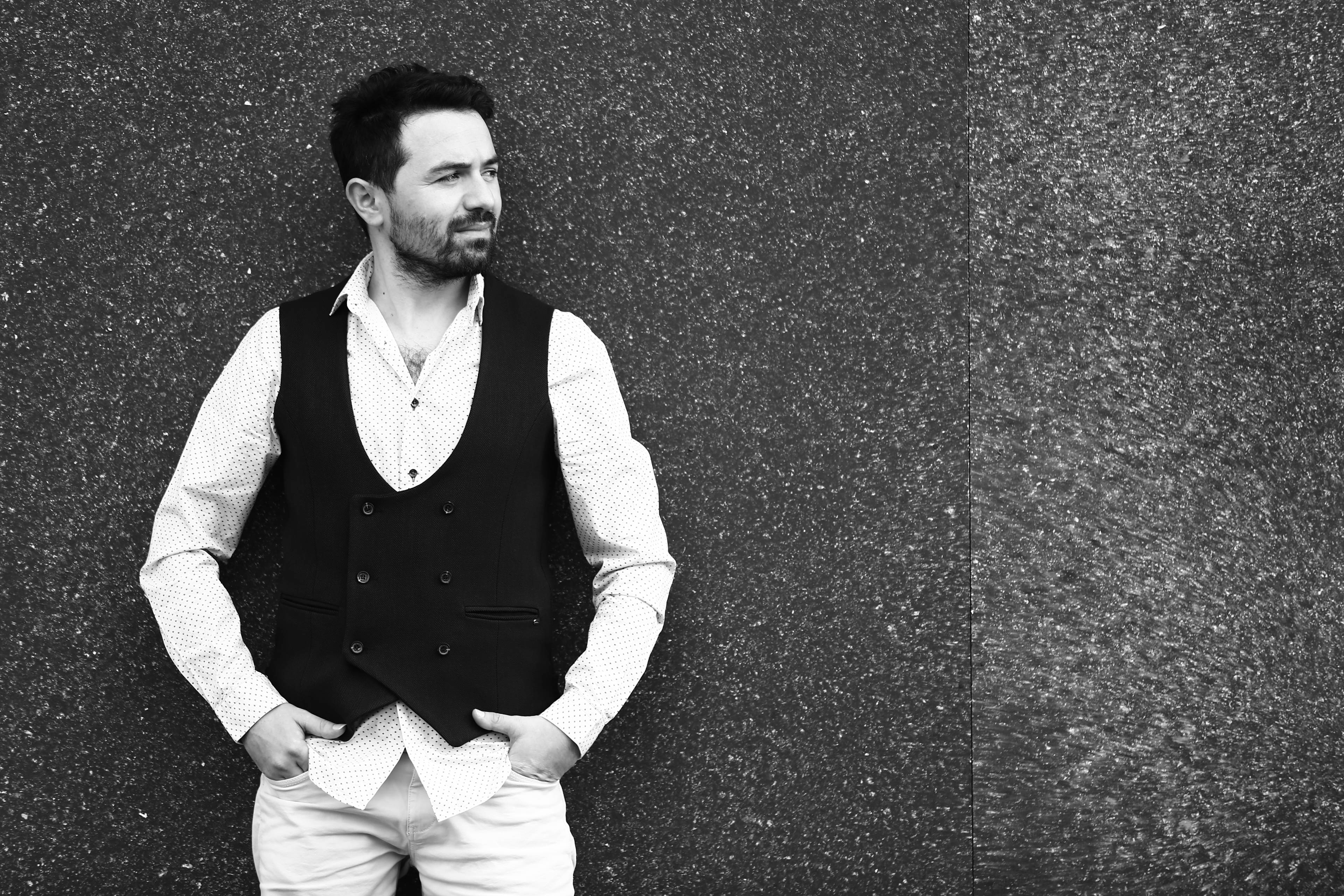
- Lermi in 2016

Background information
- Born: Abdurrahman Lermi; 1986 (age 39–40); Tonya, Turkey
- Genres: Contemporary folk music
- Occupations: Folksinger, musician
- Instruments: Kemençe, guitar
- Years active: 2011–
- Website: apolaslermi.com

Abdurrahman Lermi (born 1986), better known as Apolas Lermi, is a Turkish folksinger and musician.

== Biography ==
Lermi was born in Trabzon. At the age of 10, he relocated to Istanbul with his family. He adopted the stage name "Apolas," a nickname originally given to him by his friends. After a lengthy musical career, he decided to release an album focused on Black Sea culture.[1]

In 2011, Lermi released his debut solo album *Kalandar*, named after the first month of the year in the region's traditional calendar.[2] The album features songs in Turkish as well as Romeyka (Pontic Greek), an endangered language spoken in the Black Sea region.[2] Notable tracks from the album include "Mektup", "Ağapo Se", "Yağmur", "Seçim Zamanı", and "Ağasar Horonu". The music video for "Ağapo Se" was filmed at the Sumela Monastery, making it the first music video in Turkey to be shot at the monastery and to feature Romeyka lyrics.[2]

The song "Seçim Zamanı" was later adapted into a collaborative project titled *Diren Karadeniz*, featuring 24 artists, to raise awareness of social and cultural issues in the Black Sea region. The album established Lermi's distinct place in Black Sea folk music. He subsequently produced a television show titled *Kalandar*, which focused on traditional Black Sea music. Throughout his career, Lermi has performed traditional folk songs learned from regional bards, and many of his tracks have been featured in television series and films. He has contributed significantly to the recognition of Pontic Greek in Turkey.

In 2014, Lermi released his second solo album, *Santa*, named after Dumanlı village in Gümüşhane, home to the Santa ruins. The album features duets with Greek artists of Black Sea and Anatolian heritage, including Giorgos Ioannidis and Irodina Kandrali. Prominent tracks include "Eski Yar", "Felek", "Beşikdüzü", "Karadeniz", "Tonton", "Yaban Eller", and "Görele Horonu".

In 2016, Lermi released *Romeika*, an album recorded entirely in Romeyka and Greek, which was simultaneously launched in Turkey and Greece. Recorded with a more minimalist arrangement than his previous work, the album includes a duet with Black Sea-Greek artist Pela Nikolaidou. Vahit Tursun, author of the 2019 *Romeika Dictionary*, recited one of his poems on the album, and the artwork inside the cover featured paintings by artist and writer Muzaffer Oruçoğlu. A music video for the track "Laison" was filmed in Istanbul.

In 2017, Lermi composed the official anthem for the Turkish football club Trabzonspor.

In 2018, he released his fourth album, *Momoyer*, named after the traditional winter folk theatre festivals performed in Trabzon and across the world. The album consists of 13 tracks. For the song "Bir Baktım", Lermi filmed his first *horon* dance video. He also filmed a music video for the Greek song "Senan Kardian Apes" at Cape Jason in Ordu, a video for "Uzungöl Şerah" to highlight environmental pollution in Uzungöl, and a video for "Dünya" on Akdamar Island in Van. Other notable tracks from the album include "Kanlı Hemşin", "Memleket", "Ah Almanya", and "Karayemiş Ağacı".

In 2019, Lermi recorded a duet with Sait Uçar, a prominent figure in *kemençe* music. He has also collaborated on songs and performed live with Greek *kemençe* player Matthaios Tsahouridis. Expanding his repertoire to Zaza culture, he recorded the Zazaki-language song "Hal Yamano" with Mikail Aslan, filming its music video across Trabzon, Rize, and Tunceli. He later released another Zazaki track, "Laze Mı" (My Son), based on the story of 103-year-old Beser Özata, with a music video filmed in the Nazımiye district of Tunceli. In 2026, he released his third Zazaki-themed work, "Xime", in collaboration with Ali Doğan Gönültaş.

Lermi's political commentary and diverse artistic approach have at times made him a target of public criticism and media speculation in Turkey, leading to calls for boycotts against his work. In response, Lermi initiated legal proceedings against false reporting and released the track "Afkuranlar".

Other notable singles released by Lermi include "Yaşandı Bitti", "Giresun Gümüşhane", "Okul Yolu", "Hazreti Şah'ın Avazı", "Seni de Unuturum", "Zindan", "Yayla Horonu", and "Karadeniz Güneştir". He has also collaborated with artists such as Kardeş Türküler, Hüsnü Arkan, Ayşenur Kolivar, Babis Kemanetzidis, Sasa, and Christoforos Kosmidis.

As of 2024, Lermi resides in London, while continuing his musical projects across Turkey and Europe.
