= Badr al-Din Tabrizi =

Persian architect and scholar in medieval Anatolia

Badr al-Din Tabrizi (fl. 1250–1275; Persian: بدرالدین تبریزی) was an Iranian architect and scholar in medieval Anatolia. He is credited with the creation of the tomb of Rumi in Konya.

In all likelihood, like other Iranian craftsmen and scholars, Badr al-Din Tabrizi had come to Anatolia in order to seek safety after the Mongol invasion of Iran in the mid thirteenth century. According to the Manāqeb al-ʿārefīn, a contemporary source written by Shams al-Din Ahmad Aflaki, Badr al-Din Tabrizi also had knowledge of numerous other matters, including "astrology, mathematics, geometry, spells and magic, alchemy, philosophy, and the cultivation of citrus". Aflaki, himself a disciple of Rumi, praised Badr al-Din Tabrizi as "the second Socrates and Greek Plato".

== Sources ==
- Crane, H. (1988). "BADR-AL-DĪN TABRĪZĪ". In Yarshater, Ehsan (ed.). Encyclopædia Iranica. Vol. III/4: Bačča(-ye) Saqqā–Bahai Faith III. London and New York: Routledge & Kegan Paul. p. 382. ISBN 978-0-71009-116-1.
