= Serra (dance) =

Pontic Greek folk dance

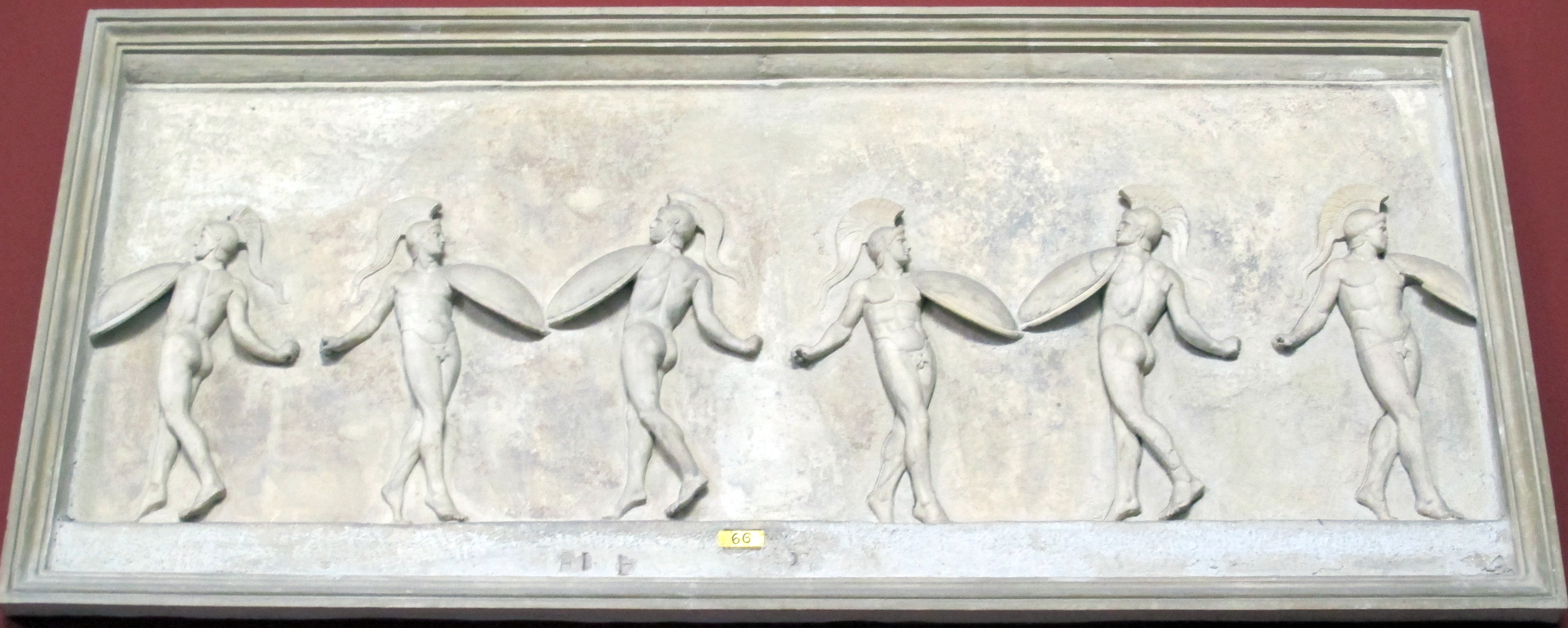

The Serra (Pontic: Σέρρα) is a Pontic Greek war dance of ancient Greek origin, from the Pontus region of the Black Sea. Its name comes from the Serra river, in the region of Trapezounda. It is also called Pyrrhichios (Greek: Πυρρίχιος). The rhythm starts in 7/16 and becomes an even meter when the dance speeds up.

The Serra is a men's dance, danced hand by hand. The Pontic Lyra often accompanies this dance.

This dance is sometimes confused with the Atsiapat, which precedes it. The two are danced in sequence with the Pyrrhichios dance following the Atsiapat.

== See also ==
- Greek dances
- Greek music
- Korybantes
