= Kemane =

Bowed string instrument traditionally used in the Balkans and Anatolia

Kemane (Macedonian: ќемане, pronounced ['cɛmanɛ]; Serbian: ћемане) is a bowed string instrument traditionally used in the Balkans and Anatolia. It is the Macedonian and southern Serbian version of the kemenche, it is very similar to the violin or viola and related to the Bulgarian gadulka. The kemane also resembles the Greek instrument lyre. The instrument is usually used to accompany folk music and singing, particularly epic poetry, and is rarely used as a solo instrument.

== Varieties ==
The kemane can be made in various forms. The length varies between 480 and 540 millimetres (19 and 21 in), their shape can be either straight or bent in a curved shape. Older kemane's were made by hacking holes in the instrument in which were inserted horse tail hairs, however the modern kemane's strings are attached to a wooden headstock, similar to that of a violin. It is prepared out of one piece of wood (walnut, maple, or other) with three structural parts: the body (krtuna), neck (shija), and the headstock (glava). The strings are set at different heights, so that it can be played on two strings simultaneously. The sound is produced by the movement of the bow from the one to the other blade, which grinding produces a sound of undetermined height.

== History ==
Although it is considered one of the oldest string instruments in the region of Macedonia, the kemane appeared in Macedonian music in the late 19th and early 20th century when it entered the Macedonian čalgija compositions. The name of the kemane probably comes from kemençe, the Turkish word for fiddle. The kemane has three strings, although there are some made with four which are very rare. It is mostly spread in Eastern Macedonia and the region of Osogovo where in some parts the instrument is referred to as kjemene, and in the northern parts of Macedonian it is called gusla, it is also played in south eastern Serbia where it is called ћемане or гусла interchangeably by locals.
