= Pyrrhichios =

Chief war-dance of the Greeks

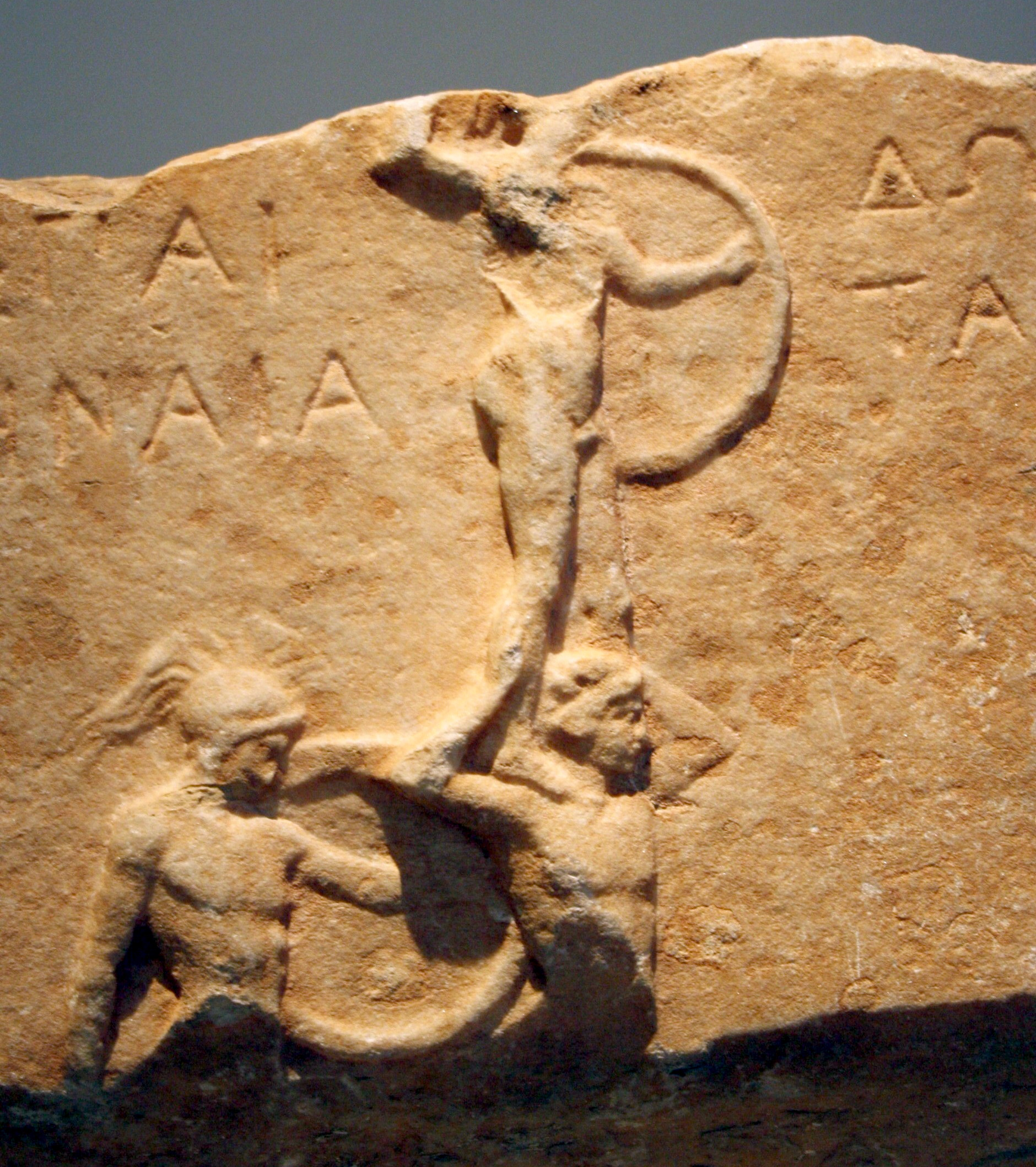
Pyrrhic dancers

The Pyrrhichios or Pyrrhike dance ("Pyrrhic dance"; Ancient Greek: πυρρίχιος or πυρρίχη, but often misspelled as πυρρίχειος or πυρήχειος) was the best known war dance of the Greeks. It was probably of Dorian origin and practiced at first solely as a training for war. According to ancient sources, it was a weapon dance.

== Overview ==
Plato (Leges, 815a) describes it as imitating by quick movements the ways in which blows and darts are to be avoided and also the modes in which an enemy is to be attacked. It was danced to the sound of the aulos; its time was quick and light, as is also shown by the metric foot called pyrrhic.

It was described by Xenophon in his work the Anabasis. In that work he writes that the dance was performed at a banquet held in Kotyora during which Greek and Paphalagonian forces settled their differences. The following is the part in which the Pyrrhic dance is mentioned:

The Paphlagonians were amazed to see all these dances performed by men in arms. At this Mysus, perceiving their astonishment, prevailed on one of the Arcadians, who had a woman dancer, to let him bring her in; which he did accordingly, after he had dressed her in the handsomest manner he was able, and given her a light buckler. She danced the Pyrrhic dance with great agility: on which there was great clapping; and the Paphlagonians asked whether the woman also charged with their troops. The others answered, that it was they who drove the king out of their camp. This was the end of that night's entertainment.

According to a tradition reported by Aristotle, the originator of the pyrriche was Achilles, who danced it around the funeral pyre of Patroclus.

The dance was loved in all of Greece and especially by the Spartans, who considered it light war training. This belief led the Spartans to teach the dance to their children while they were still young.

Athenian youth performed the dance in the palaestra as part of training in gymnastics. The dance was also performed in the Panathenaic Games. There were three classes of competitors: men, youth, and boys.

== See also ==
- Korybantes
- Pyrrichos
- Serra (dance)
