= Meander campaigns of Alexios Philanthropenos =

13th century Byzantine campaigns

Meander Campaigns of Alexios Philanthropenos
- The Haemus and Anatolia in 1265
Date	1293–autumn 1295
Location	Bithynia, Meander River Valley and Caria, western Anatolia
Result	Byzantine victory
Territorial changes	Reconquest of Achyraous, Melanoudion, Hieron and Miletus

Belligerents
Byzantine Empire	Anatolian beyliks; Beylik of Menteshe

Commanders and leaders
Alexios Philanthropenos; Libadarios; Chortatzes	Merut; Salamat-Karman ibn Mantasa

Units involved
Thematic troops Cretan cavalry Turkoman mercenaries	Unknown

Strength
Unknown	Unknown

Casualties and losses
Unknown	Heavy

The Meander Campaigns of 1293–1295 were a series of successful Byzantine military operations led by the strategos Alexios Philanthropenos against the expanding Turkoman beyliks along the Meander River Valley, in western Asia Minor. Acting on behalf of his uncle, Emperor Andronikos II Palaiologos, Philanthropenos succeeded in reversing much of the territorial contraction suffered by the Byzantines in the preceding decades, although these gains proved short-lived.

== Background ==
=== Developments in Anatolia ===
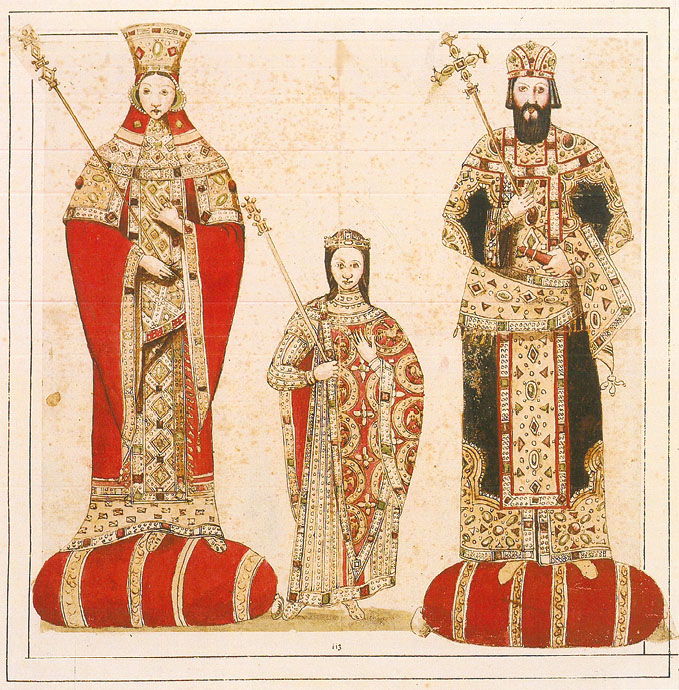
Reproduction of a lost Byzantine miniature portraying Emperor Michael VIII alongside Theodora and Constantine, from the Peribleptos Monastery in Mystras

Following the Reconquest of Constantinople in 1261, by the general Alexios Strategopoulos of the Empire of Nicaea, the Palaiologan dynasty increasingly redirected its military and financial resources towards the empire’s European territories. According to historian Speros Vryonis:

The conquest of Constantinople rekindled, as was to be expected, Latin crusading fervor, and henceforth the Greek rulers were forced to defend themselves, diplomatically and militarily, against the counterattack of the Latins. The corollary to the reconquest of Constantinople was the repossession of the empire’s former lands in Europe, so that the emperors were caught up in the politics and strife of Slav rulers, Greek despots, and Latin princes. The occupation of Constantinople also brought the empire into the focal point of the Venetian-Genoese commercial fire. The manpower and finances of the state were not equal to the demands and tasks that the repossession of Constantinople had imposed.

The withdrawal or reduction of imperial military forces in order to reinforce the European territories, combined with the discontent and alienation of the local population towards the Palaiologos dynasty due to their overthrown of the Laskaris dynasty (as expressed in the Arsenite Schism) and the abolishment of the tax immunities of the akritai frontier garrisons by Michael VIII, all undermined the ability of the Byzantine authorities to maintain the extensive network of fortifications and field armies that had previously protected the interior of western Asia Minor.

Following the Mongol conquest of Anatolia, the subjugation of the Sultanate of Rum after the battles of Köse Dağ and Aksaray, and the defeat of the Turkoman tribes in 1261 and in 1262 by Seljuk‐Mongol forces, the nomadic Turkomans moved westwards. These groups crossed into imperial territory with increasing frequency and sought to enrich themselves by raiding Byzantine settlements and the wider countryside, while violently establishing themselves in areas that had previously been under imperial control. The resulting insecurity encouraged further depopulation of exposed districts and contributed to the abandonment of cultivated land and cities. By the late 13th century, several independent beyliks had emerged in Anatolia. The combination of Turkoman raiding, the loss of fortified positions, and the fragmentation of political authority placed substantial portions of western Anatolia under sustained economic and military pressure.

=== Byzantine response ===
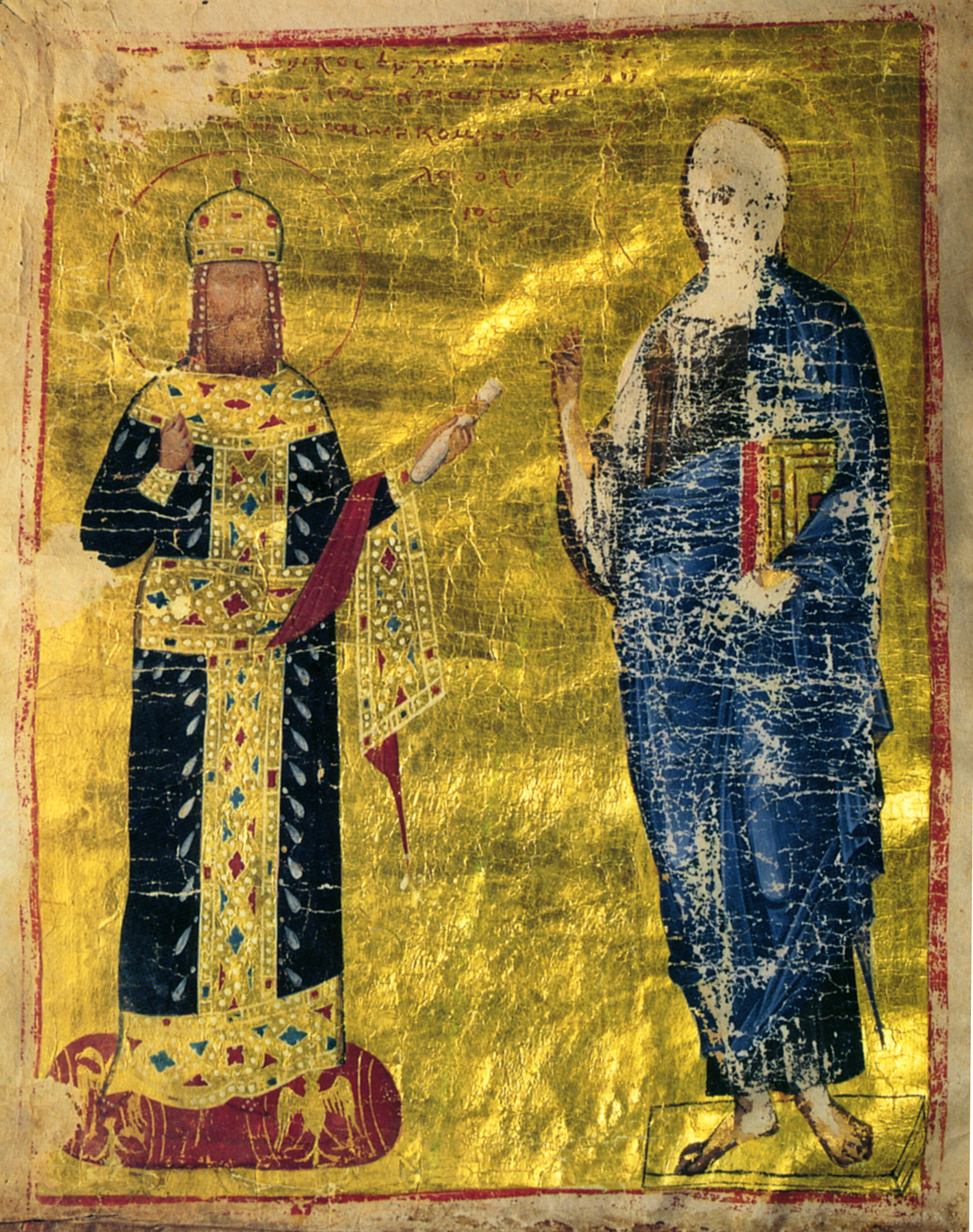
Chrysobull depicting the Byzantine Emperor Andronikos II next to Christ Pantocrator

As a response to the deterioration of the Anatolian frontier, Emperor Michael VIII visited the region along the Sangarios River in 1280. In the same year, his son Andronikos II rebuilt and repopulated the city of Tralles with 36,000 residents. The next year, Michael VIII returned to the Sangarios front, where he built and restored several fortresses and planted forests to hinder enemy advances. He briefly returned to the region for the last time in 1282. However, these efforts only temporarily halted the Turkomans, and as soon as the emperor departed, the region was overrun, and in 1284 Tralles was sacked by the Beylik of Menteshe and its population was either massacred or sold into slavery. Andronikos II returned to Anatolia from 1290 to June 1293, residing in Nymphaion. He inspected the region, tried to strengthen morale, and rebuilt fortifications. However, his measures proved ineffective, while Anatolian refugees continued to flee for the empire's European holdings.

After completing his inspection of the region, Andronikos II hoped to reconstitute the akritai by settling Cretan refugees, fleeing from Venetian occupation, at Anaia and Ephesus, while also providing them with salaries financed through a 10% tax on pronoia. For this reason, in 1293, he appointed his young nephew, Alexios Philanthropenos, as pinkernes and doux of the Thracesian Theme, giving him control over the regions of Nymphaion and Lydia. His subordinate was to be Libadarios, whose headquarters were at Neokastra, while the leader of the Cretans was to be a man named Chortatzes.

== Campaigns ==
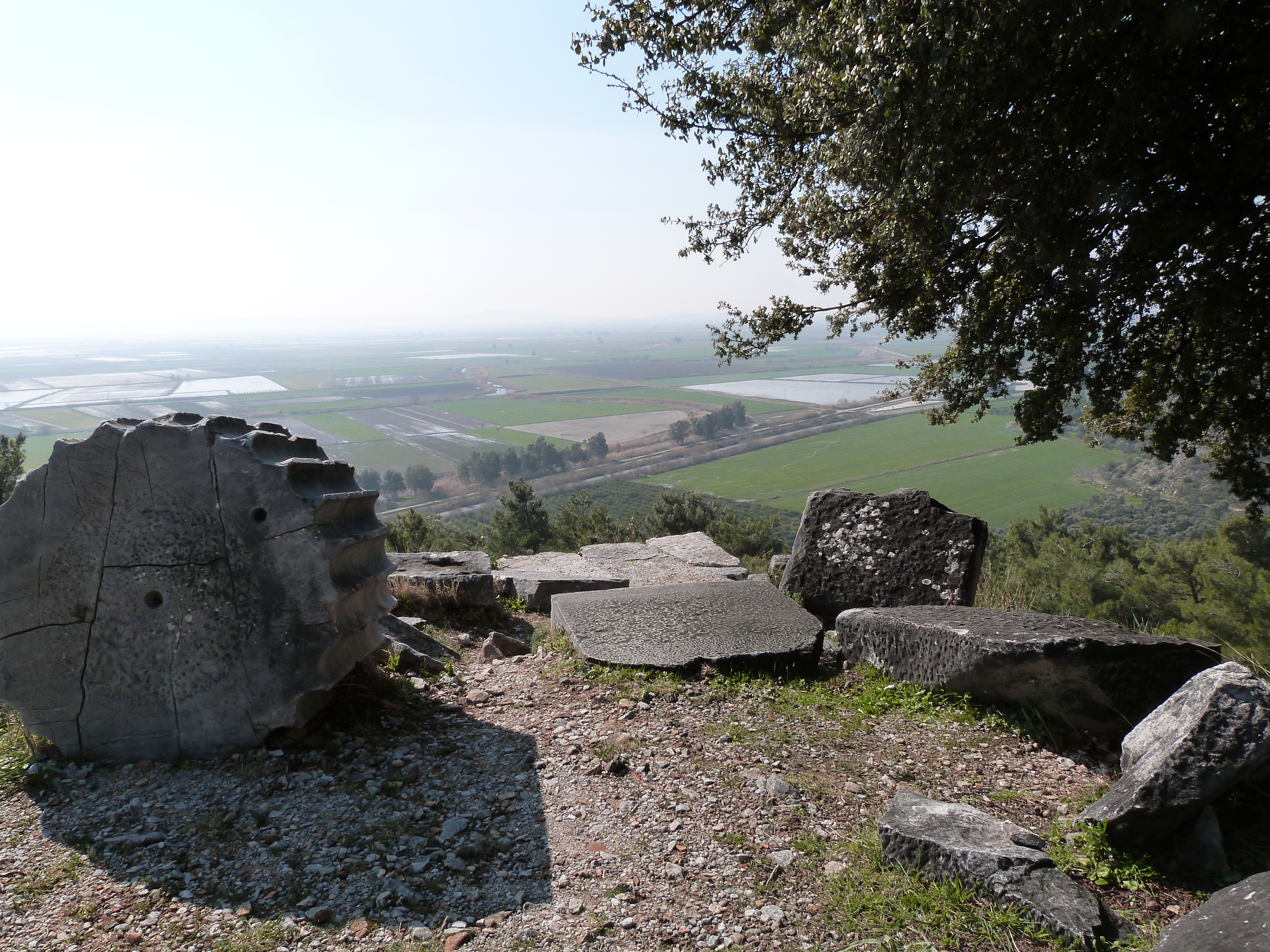
View of the Meander River Valley from the ruins of ancient Greek city of Priene

From his headquarters at Nymphaion, Philanthropenos first defeated the invading Turkomans ravaging Mysia at Achyraous in 1293/94. Following his victory, he secured the Meander. Various unnamed forts and cities were rescued and threatened villages were made safe. Furthermore, he made peace with the nomads, gave a large portion of the spoils to his soldiers, and sent the rest to Constantinople, along with many captives, which greatly pleased the emperor. In the middle of 1294, he was given imperial orders to surrender the Hermos River Valley to Libadarios, which he did.

In the summer of 1295, his friend Maximus Planudes encountered him near the ruins of Tralles, and saw his troops carrying back loot from beyond Nysa. Seeing how many enemy warriors were captured during the campaigns, Planudes remarked that "a sheep was more expensive to buy than a Muslim prisoner".

Due to his military successes and stabilisation of the frontier, Philanthropenos gained widespread popularity and praise from much of the Anatolian population, particularly from the clergy and the army. His own Cretan soldiers and local monastic communities even attempted to persuade him to proclaim himself as emperor, as they were dissatisfied with the ineffective government of Andronikos II and his taxation policies. For this reason, along with the alleged jealousy of Libadarios, in the summer or fall of 1295, Philanthropenos requested to be relieved of his command, but the emperor refused.

Ruins of the Byzantine castle in Miletus

While Philanthropenos was campaigning in the Meander, a Turkoman commander named Salamat-Karman ibn Mantasa seized the opportunity and attacked a fortress north of Priene, but his troops failed to take it and were forced to retreat to Miletus after Philanthropenos arrived and chased them away. Hieron was also reconquered by Philanthropenos around that time.

In late 1294 or in the fall of 1295, he moved southwards, drove the nomadic tribes back over the Meander river, and even advanced into Caria against the Beylik of Menteshe, where he reconquered and fortified the island city of Melanoudion. The same year, he took the fortress of Dyo Bounoi, reconquered nearby Miletus, and then again recaptured Hieron. Due to his successes, many Turks even sought Philanthropenos' protection from the Mongols and joined his forces as mercenaries.

== Aftermath ==
=== Rebellion of Alexios Philanthropenos ===
In the autumn of 1295, possibly because the emperor demanded an increased tribute from the victorious campaigns, Philanthropenos was convinced by his friend Melchisedek Akropolites, by the prokathemenos of Smyrna, Malakes, by the abbot of the Sanidon Monastery (near Adramyttium), Tarchas, and by his Cretan soldiers to launch a rebellion. He was proclaimed emperor by his supporters and established himself as an autonomous ruler. Pachymeres wrote that:

in the many great monasteries of that part the name of the Emperor was no longer commemorated, but only that of Philanthropenos.

He marched to Ephesus and arrested the emperor's youngest brother, Theodore Palaiologos, whom he imprisoned inside the city's citadel. However, Libadarios, who was also Theodore's father-in-law, remained loyal to Andronikos II and bribed Chortatzes to arrest Philanthropenos. Consequently, the rebellious strategos was betrayed by his Cretan soldiers, was handed over to Libadarios at Nymphaion (in whose citadel Philanthropenos had also sheltered his wife and son), and was subsequently blinded on 25 December 1295 on Christmas day.

Following Philanthropenos blinding, the Turkoman mercenaries in the army were killed by the Cretans, and the survivors fled to the rising Ottoman Beylik to reinforce the troops of Osman I. Andronikos II only learned of the uprising on 1 January 1296, and intended to marry him to Theodora Palaiologina Kantakouzene Raoulaina and even offer him the imperial crown, before learning that he had already been blinded in 6 January.

=== Collapse of the frontier ===
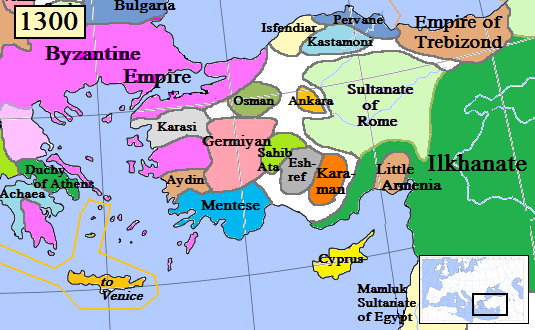
The Byzantine Empire and the beyliks c. 1300

After the blinding and imprisonment of Philanthropenos, Andronikos II appointed John Tarchaneiotes to stabilise the frontier in 1298. However, his military reforms, distribution of pronoia, and anti-corruption policies in the army, along with his Arsenite background, proved unpopular with the local aristocracy and clergy. Eventually, he was falsely accused of planning a rebellion by the metropolitan bishop of Philadelphia, Theoleptos, and was forced to flee from Asia Minor. His reforms were quickly abandoned afterwards.

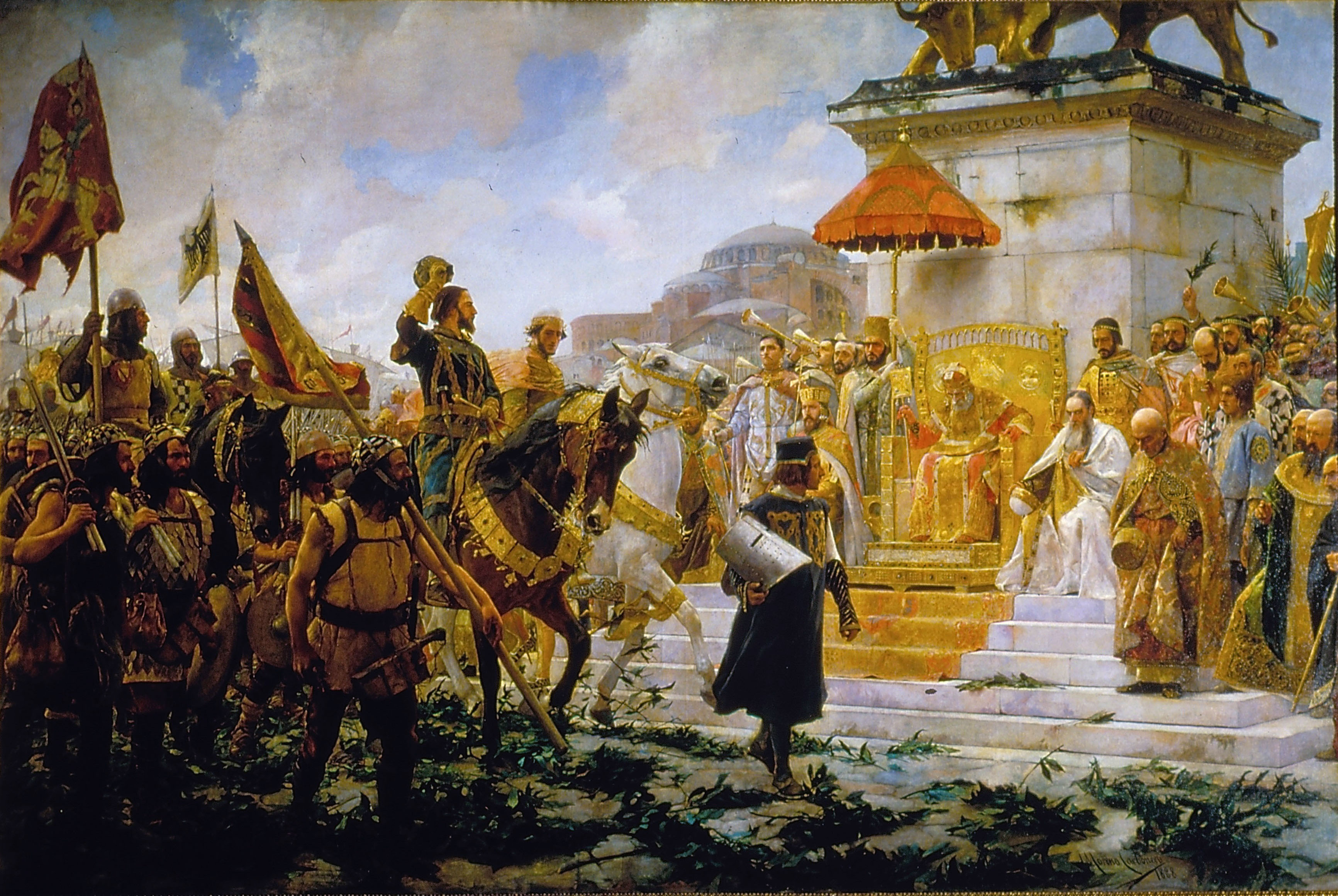
"The Entry of Roger de Flor into Constantinople", by José Moreno Carbonero in 1888

After Alexios Philanthropenos was imprisoned and after John Tarchaneiotes was removed from his position, the Anatolian frontier rapidly collapsed. Turkoman tribes raided and conquered multiple settlements with little resistance, forming their own beyliks and emirates, leading to the Byzantine defeats at Bapheus and Magnesia. Andronikos II consequently hired the Catalan Company of Roger de Flor in 1302, in hopes of better combating the nomadic invasions and stopping the crisis, resulting in the Catalan campaign in Asia Minor.

== Bibliography ==
- Angelov, Dimiter (2007). Imperial Ideology and Political Thought in Byzantium (1204-1330). Cambridge, United Kingdom: Cambridge University Press. ISBN 978-0-521-85703-1.
- Bartusis, Mark C. (1997). The Late Byzantine Army: Arms and Society 1204–1453. Philadelphia, Pennsylvania: University of Pennsylvania Press. ISBN 0-8122-1620-2.
- Haldon, John (2002). Byzantium at War: AD 600–1453. Osprey Publishing. ISBN 978-1-84176-360-6.
- Laiou, Angeliki (1978). "Some Observations on Alexios Philanthropenos and Maximos Planoudes". Byzantine and Modern Greek Studies. IV. doi:10.1179/030701378806931725.
- Nicol, Donald M. (1993) [1972]. The Last Centuries of Byzantium, 1261–1453 (Second ed.). Cambridge: Cambridge University Press. ISBN 978-0-521-43991-6.
- Kazhdan, Alexander, ed. (1991), Oxford Dictionary of Byzantium, Oxford University Press, ISBN 978-0-19-504652-6
- Ostrogorsky, George (1969). History of the Byzantine State. Rutgers University Press. ISBN 978-0-8135-0599-2.
- Trapp, Erich (2001). Prosopographisches Lexikon der Palaiologenzeit. Austrian Academy of Sciences. ISBN 978-3700130031.
- Treadgold, Warren (1997). A History of the Byzantine State and Society. Stanford University Press. ISBN 978-0-8047-2630-6.
- Vryonis, Speros (1971). The Decline of Medieval Hellenism in Asia Minor and the Process of Islamization from the Eleventh through the Fifteenth Century. University of California Press. ISBN 0-520-01597-5.
