= Vatatzes =

Byzantine Greek noble family

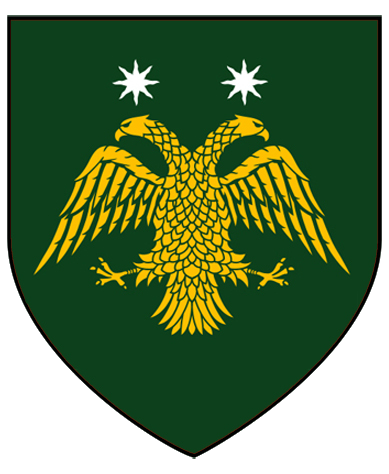
Alleged coat of arms of the Vatatzes family

The House of Vatatzes or Batatzes (Greek: Βατάτζης) was a noble Byzantine Greek family of the 11th–14th centuries with several branches, which produced several senior generals of the Byzantine army and, after John III Doukas Vatatzes intermarried with the Laskaris family, the ruling line of the Empire of Nicaea until the usurpation of Michael VIII Palaiologos in 1261. The feminine form of the name is Vatatzina or Vatatzaina (Βατατζίνα) or Batatzina or Batatzaina (Βατατζίνα).

== Origins ==
According to the Greek scholar Konstantinos Amantos, the name Vatatzes is a diminutive form of βάτος, vatos, 'bramble, briar', and suggests that it was given as a nickname signifying a harsh character. Another possible origin is βατάκι, vataki, 'ray fish'.

The first member of the family, known simply by his surname, is attested around the year 1000. John Skylitzes (Synopsis Historion, 343.134) records that "Vatatzes with his entire family" was among those "distinguished citizens of Adrianople" who fled to the Bulgarian emperor Samuel because they were accused of pro-Bulgarian sentiments. Over the next centuries, the family remained associated with Adrianople and the surrounding region (the thema of Macedonia), where their estates were. Likewise the 13th-century chronicler Ephraim the Monk mentions Didymoteichon as the family's native city.

== In the 11th–12th centuries ==
Michael Psellos records that in 1047, a John Vatatzes joined the revolt of Leo Tornikios, a relative of Emperor Constantine IX Monomachos (r. 1042–1055). The family became prominent in the 12th century, when several members rose to high offices. Theodore Vatatzes married Eudokia, the sister of Emperor Manuel I Komnenos (r. 1143–1180) and was named despotes; his sons were Andronikos, Alexios, and John Komnenos Vatatzes, who became megas domestikos (commander-in-chief of the Byzantine army). The hagiographer of the Nicaean emperor John III Doukas Vatatzes (r. 1221/22–1254), identified John with the latter's grandfather, who supposedly had two sons named Nikephoros and Theodore, who were persecuted by Andronikos I Komnenos (r. 1183–1185). According to Niketas Choniates, however, John's sons were named Manuel and Alexios. This is most likely the result of a confusion by the hagiographer.

Other contemporary members were Leo Vatatzes, who under Manuel I fought against the Hungarians; a 12th-century seal mentions the "patrikios, hypatos, and stratelates of the West" Bryennios Vatatzes; another seal mentions Nikephoros Vatatzes, "protoproedros, vestarches, megas doux, and praetor of the Aegean Sea"; a Joseph Vatatzes, possibly a monk, is also known through his seal, likely from the 13th century; while a Basil Vatatzes is known as doux and anagrapheus of a province under the Nicaean emperor Theodore I Laskaris (r. 1205–1221/22).

== Rulers of the Empire of Nicaea ==
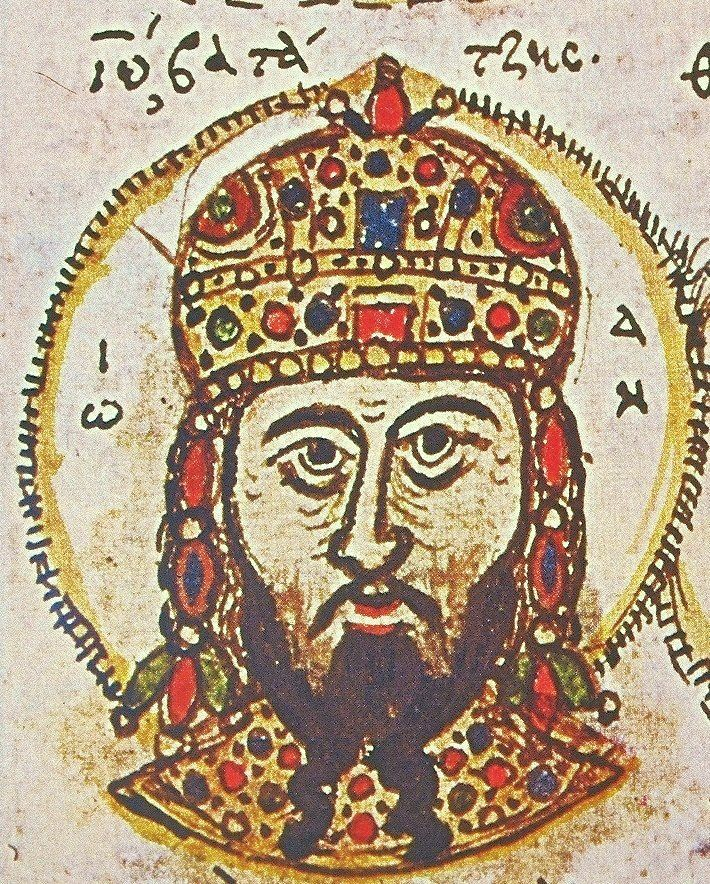
15th-century miniature portrait of the Nicaean emperor John III Doukas Vatatzes, founder of the imperial line of the family

Another Basil Vatatzes, a man of undistinguished birth according to Choniates, married into the Angelos family and rose to become domestikos of the West under Isaac II Angelos (r. 1185–1195). It is possibly due to this connection that the 14th-century Chronicle of the Morea calls Isaac II "Sakes Vatatzes" (Σάκης Βατάτζης). Modern scholars consider Basil as the father of John III Doukas Vatatzes, who thus had no direct connection to the Komnenian-era noble family. Basil had two further sons, the sebastokrator Isaac and an anonymous third son. Isaac had a son named John and an unnamed daughter who married Constantine Strategopoulos, while the other brother had a daughter who became the wife of the protovestiarios Alexios Raoul.

Born in c. 1192, John married Irene, daughter of the founder of the Empire of Nicaea, Theodore I Laskaris (r. 1205–1221/22), and succeeded him on the throne, despite the opposition of Theodore's brothers. John proved a capable ruler, defeating the Latin Empire at the Battle of Poimanenon, and expanding his realm into Europe, where he captured Thessalonica in 1246. Remembered for his kindness as well as his ability, he was venerated as a saint after his death by the Greeks of Asia Minor. John III was succeeded as Emperor of Nicaea by his only son Theodore II (r. 1254–1258), who however preferred his mother's surname, Laskaris. With his wife Helena, he had five children. Theodore II was succeeded by his only son, John IV Laskaris (r. 1258–1261), but was driven from the throne by Michael VIII Palaiologos (r. 1259–1282) after the reconquest of Constantinople in 1261, blinded, and placed in confinement in a remote fortress, where he died some time after 1285.

== Later members ==
The last prominent member was John Vatatzes, who occupied a succession of high offices in 1333–1345. Another John Vatatzes was a landowner at Caesaropolis in 1320–1322; a Constantine Vatatzes was archon in Ioannina in 1367, before being banished by Thomas Preljubovic; a Basil Vatatzes was a hymn writer sometime before 1433; a Theodore Vatatzes donated to the Agioi Pantes Monastery of Mount Athos in 1447; John Vatatzes was a hymn writer from Crete and protopsaltes (first cantor) at Candia in 1465; the goldsmith Frangiskos Vatatzes is known from a testament of 1497; and in 1563 the priest Konstantinos Vatatzes is attested. Finally, in the 17th century, Vasilios Vatatzes (born 1694) from Therapeia near Constantinople, who travelled extensively in Persia and Russia and wrote about his travels.

A variant of the family name, Diplovatatzes (Διπλοβατάτζης, "Double Vatatzes"), was used from the mid-13th century on for family members who descended from the Vatatzai on both sides. They too ranked among the senior nobility of the late Byzantine Empire. An Alexios and Manuel Diplovatatzes are mentioned in the 14th century, along with the protovestiarites and lord of Veroia Diplovatatzes; a Theodore Diplovatatzes granted the Vatopedi Monastery lands on Lemnos in 1430; and the last member of the family was Tommaso Diplovataccio (1468–1541), who became a distinguished jurist and scholar in Renaissance Italy.

== Family trees ==
=== Komnenian-era family ===
Eudokia Komnene (daughter of John II Komnenos)	Theodore Vatatzes general
	John megas domestikos

=== Nicaean imperial dynasty ===
Theodore I Emperor of Nicaea (1205-1222); HOUSE OF LASKARIS	Basil; HOUSE OF VATATZES
Irene Laskarina	John III; Emperor of Nicaea (1222-1254)	Ivan Asen II tsar of Bulgaria	Isaac sebastokrator
Theodore II; Emperor of Nicaea (1254-1258)	Elena Asenina	John
Irene ∞ Konstantin I Tih tsar of Bulgaria	John IV; Emperor of Nicaea (1258-1261)	Maria ∞ Nikephoros I Komnenos Doukas despot of Epirus	Theodora	Michael VIII; Byzantine Emperor (1259-1282); HOUSE OF PALAIOLOGOS

== See also ==
- History of the Byzantine Empire
- Empire of Nicaea

== Sources ==
- Amantos, Konstantinos (1951). "Ἡ οἰκογένεια Βατάτζη". Επετηρίς Εταιρείας Βυζαντινών Σπουδών (in Greek). XI: 174–178.
- Kazhdan, Alexander, ed. (1991). The Oxford Dictionary of Byzantium. Oxford and New York: Oxford University Press. ISBN 0-19-504652-8.
- Polemis, Demetrios I. (1968). The Doukai: A Contribution to Byzantine Prosopography. London: The Athlone Press.
- Trapp, Erich; Beyer, Hans-Veit; Walther, Rainer; Sturm-Schnabl, Katja; Kislinger, Ewald; Leontiadis, Ioannis; Kaplaneres, Sokrates (1976–1996). Prosopographisches Lexikon der Palaiologenzeit (in German). Vienna: Verlag der Österreichischen Akademie der Wissenschaften. ISBN 3-7001-3003-1.
- Varzos, Konstantinos (1984). Η Γενεαλογία των Κομνηνών [The Genealogy of the Komnenoi] (PDF) (in Greek). Vol. B. Thessaloniki: Centre for Byzantine Studies, University of Thessaloniki.
- Venetis, Evangelos (2012). "VATATZES, Vasilios". Encyclopaedia Iranica.
- Wortley, John, ed. (2010). John Skylitzes: A Synopsis of Byzantine History, 811–1057. Cambridge: Cambridge University Press. ISBN 978-0-521-76705-7.
