= Vasileios Vatatzes =

Greek scholar in Iran (1694–c. 1748)

Vasileios Vatatzes (Greek: Βασίλειος Βατάτζης; 1694 – after 1748), was a Greek figure who flourished in the 18th century. He is best remembered as a scholar, merchant, traveler, pioneer explorer and diplomat. At a young age, he settled in Moscow, from where he travelled to Iran on several occasions. He eventually became acquainted with Nader-Qoli Beg (later known as Nader Shah; r. 1736–1747) and spent considerable time close to him. Vatatzes wrote a biography in Greek about Nader Shah, known as the Persika, an important work which provides information about Iran in the 1720s, 1730s and 1740s. He also wrote a travel account, the Periegetikon, and drew a map. According to Evangelos Venetis, Vatatzes was "an admirer of Persian civilization and of Nader Shah's rule" and an "important author for Iranian history and Hellenic-Iranian studies". However, his works "have been largely ignored by modern scholarship".

== Biography ==
Vasileios Vatatzes was born in Therapeia near Constantinople in the Ottoman Empire and was a scion of the Vatatzes noble family. His father was a Greek Orthodox priest who served at the Hagia Sophia in Constantinople, and he had five siblings.

At the age of fourteen, Vatatzes moved to Moscow in the Tsardom of Russia where he became a merchant. In the subsequent period, he visited Safavid Iran on no less than three occasions. In 1713, he visited Derbent (Darband) and Shamakhi in the Safavid province of Shirvan. Three years later, in 1716, he once again went to Shirvan and from there he travelled further to Rasht in Gilan, Qazvin, Saveh, Qom, Kashan and the Safavid royal capital of Isfahan. He returned to Moscow through Ardabil, Derbent and Astrakhan. Several years later, in 1727/8, he once again visited Iran through Astrakhan, the Aral Sea, Khiva, and Bukhara. During this particular trip, he stayed at Mashhad, Mazandaran (Sari, Babol) and Gilan (Rasht). He also became acquainted with Nader-Qoli Beg (later known as Nader Shah; r. 1736–1747). During his stay at Mashhad, Vatatzes delivered a message from Nader to the Russian force which occupied Rasht, commanded by General Vasily Levasov.

According to the modern historian Evangelos Venetis, Vatatzes had traveled to Prussia, the Kingdom of France, the Dutch Republic, Great Britain and Denmark by 1732/3. Post-1733 information about Vatatzes's life remains obscure. Venetis notes that in all likelihood, according to Vatatzes's own writings, he "spent much time in the court of Nader Shah, accumulating all necessary information before compiling Nader Shah's biography". In addition to spending much time at court, he also participated in Nader's military expeditions. In 1748, Vatatzes completed Nader's biography (known as the Persika) in Greek. Vatatzes was proficient in Persian and also drew a map.

According to Venetis, Vatatzes "was associated with the 18th-century Greek Enlightenment of the Danubian Principalities". Venetis adds that Vatatzes either wrote his manuscripts at the court of the Greek Phanariote rulers of the Danubian Principalities or they were reproduced there in large quantities after his death. Anyhow, in all likelihood, Vatatzes was a member of the retinue of the Phanariote rulers. Venetis adds that Vatatzes was "an admirer of Persian civilization and of Nader Shah's rule" and an "important author for Iranian history and Hellenic-Iranian studies". However, his works "have been largely ignored by modern scholarship".

== Sources ==
- Amantos, Konstantinos (1951). Ἡ οἰκογένεια Βατάτζη [The Vatatzes family]. Επετηρίς Εταιρείας Βυζαντινών Σπουδών (in Greek). XI: 174–178. hdl:11615/15382.
- Sariyannis, Marinos (2014). "An Eighteenth-Century Ottoman Greek's Travel Account in Central Asia". In İ. Şahin; B. Isakov; C. Buyar (eds.). CIÉPO Interim Symposium: The Central Asiatic Roots of Ottoman Culture. Istanbul. pp. 47–60.
- Venetis, Evangelos (2012). "Vatatzes, Vasilios". In Yarshater, Ehsan (ed.). Encyclopædia Iranica (Online ed.). Encyclopædia Iranica Foundation.
