= John Palaiologos (Caesar) =

Governor of Thessalonica

John Palaiologos (Greek: Ἱωάννης Παλαιολόγος; 1288/89–1326) was a member of the reigning Palaiologos dynasty of the Byzantine Empire, who served as governor of Thessalonica.

== Life ==
He was the son of the general Constantine Palaiologos, in turn a son of Emperor Michael VIII Palaiologos (reigned 1259–1282), and his wife Irene Palaiologina Raoulaina.

In 1305 John received the court rank of panhypersebastos. By 1325/26, at a time of civil war, he was governor of Thessalonica. In 1326 he rebelled against his uncle, Emperor Andronikos II Palaiologos, and joined the forces of the Serbian ruler, Stephen Uroš III Dečanski, with whom he plundered the Byzantine domains in central Macedonia up to Serres. Andronikos II sought to placate him by sending envoys bearing the insignia of a Caesar, the second-highest title in Byzantine court hierarchy, and John agreed to give up his revolt and return to Thessalonica. However, he contracted an illness and died soon after at Skopje.

Shortly after 1305/06 John married a lady named Eirene, daughter of Theodoros Metochites. The couple had a daughter, Maria, who became Stephen Uroš's queen consort, and an unnamed son, who was killed at the Battle of Rusokastro in 1332.
