= Constantine Palaiologos (son of Andronikos II) =

Byzantine prince

- Porphyrogennetos
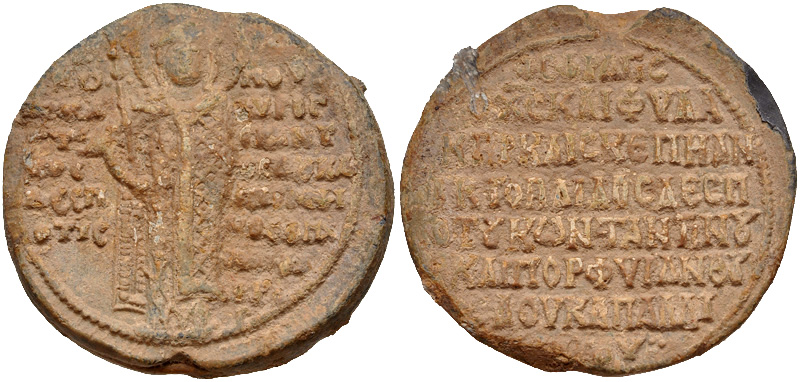
- Lead seal of Constantine, showing him in imperial regalia, and mentioning his titles of Despot and porphyrogennetos

Despot of the Byzantine Empire
- Tenure: 1294 – 1322
- Emperors: Andronikos III Palaiologos; Michael IX Palaiologos; Andronikos II Palaiologos
- Thessaloniki: 1321 – 1322
- Predecessor: John Palaiologos (in 1307)
- Successor: Demetrios Palaiologos
- Born: 1278/81
- Died: 1334/5
- Spouse: Eudokia Mouzalon (m. 1294)
- Dynasty: Palaiologos
- Father: Andronikos II Palaiologos
- Mother: Anna of Hungary

Constantine Doukas Komnenos Palaiologos (Ancient Greek: Κωνσταντῖνος Δούκας Κομνηνός Παλαιολόγος; 1278/81–1334/35) was a Byzantine prince of the Palaiologos dynasty, who received the supreme title of Despot and served as provincial governor.

== Life ==
Constantine was the second son of Emperor Andronikos II Palaiologos (r. 1282–1328) and his first wife, Empress Anna of Hungary. He was born sometime between 1278 and 1281. As his father was already a reigning co-emperor alongside his grandfather Michael VIII Palaiologos (r. 1259–1282), he was styled a porphyrogennetos ('purple-born'), as attested on his seals. In 1294 he was named Despot, the highest court rank in the Byzantine Empire, on the occasion of his first marriage to Eudokia, the daughter of Theodore Mouzalon.

In 1305, he fought in the disastrous Battle of Apros against the Catalan Company under the command of his oldest brother, the co-emperor Michael IX. In 1317, he intercepted his half-sister Simonida, the queen-consort of Serbia, who wished to retire to a monastery after the death of her mother, Irene of Montferrat, and returned her to the Serbs. At about this time he married a second time, again to a Eudokia, but both his marriages were childless. He nevertheless had one illegitimate son, Michael Katharos.

In 1319 he served as governor of Avlona, and in 1321–1322 as governor of Thessalonica. It was in this position that the outbreak of the Byzantine civil war of 1321–1328 found him; in 1322 he was imprisoned by his nephew, Andronikos III Palaiologos, at Didymoteichon. Constantine then became a monk, under the monastic name Kallistos. He died in 1334/35.

== Sources ==
- Trapp, Erich; Beyer, Hans-Veit; Walther, Rainer; Sturm-Schnabl, Katja; Kislinger, Ewald; Leontiadis, Ioannis; Kaplaneres, Sokrates (1976–1996). Prosopographisches Lexikon der Palaiologenzeit (in German). Vienna: Verlag der Österreichischen Akademie der Wissenschaften. ISBN 3-7001-3003-1.
