= Theodore Palaiologos (son of Michael VIII) =

Byzantine prince and general

Theodore Komnenos Palaiologos (Greek: Θεόδωρος Κομνηνός Παλαιολόγος; ca. 1263 – after 1310) was a son of the Byzantine Emperor Michael VIII Palaiologos (reigned 1259–1282) and his consort, Theodora Palaiologina.

He was born ca. 1263, and was the youngest of Michael VIII's sons. In 1293, he was intended to wed the daughter of Theodore Mouzalon, but as his brother, Emperor Andronikos II Palaiologos, denied him the title of Despot, he declined and wedded a daughter of the pinkernes Libadarios instead. In 1295 he was at Ephesus when the revolt of Alexios Philanthropenos broke out, and was seized and imprisoned by the rebel until the latter's defeat. In 1305 he fought against the Catalan Company at the Battle of Apros in Thrace. He is last mentioned in 1310 as one of the witnesses to a treaty with the Republic of Venice.

== Sources ==
- Trapp, Erich; Beyer, Hans-Veit; Kaplaneres, Sokrates; Leontiadis, Ioannis (1989). "21464. Παλαιολόγος, Θεόδωρος Κομνηνός". Prosopographisches Lexikon der Palaiologenzeit (in German). Vol. 9. Vienna: Verlag der Österreichischen Akademie der Wissenschaften. ISBN 3-7001-3003-1.
