= Anna of Hungary (disambiguation) =

Anna of Hungary may refer to:

- Anna of Hungary, Duchess of Macsó (born 1226), daughter of Bela IV of Hungary, wife of prince Rostislav Mikhailovich
- Anna of Hungary (Byzantine empress) (c. 1260–1281), daughter of Stephen V of Hungary, first wife of Andronikos II Palaiologos
- Anne, Duchess of Luxembourg (1432–1462), daughter of Albert II of Germany, wife of her co-ruler William III, Duke of Luxembourg
- Anna of Bohemia and Hungary (1503–1547), daughter of Vladislaus II of Bohemia and Hungary, wife of Ferdinand I, Holy Roman Emperor
- Archduchess Anna of Austria (1528–1590), daughter of Anna of Bohemia and Hungary, wife of Albert V, Duke of Bavaria
- Anna of Austria (1549–1580), daughter of Maximilian II, Holy Roman Emperor, king of Hungary, fourth wife of Philip II of Spain
- Anna of Tyrol (1585–1618), daughter of Ferdinand II, Archduke of Further Austria, wife of Matthias, Holy Roman Emperor, king of Hungary
