= Tommaso Diplovataccio =

Italian jurist (1468–1541)

Tommaso Diplovataccio or Diplovatazio (1468–1541) was an Italian jurist, publisher and politician.

His family was Greek nobility that emigrated from Corfu to Naples after the fall of Constantinople. After studies in Naples (where he married Maria Laskaris), in Padua and Ferrara, he held the office of fiscal in Pesaro from 1492 to 1507. The wealth he obtained by a 1494 marriage to a trader's daughter allowed him to reduce his work as a jurisconsult and concentrate on scholarly pursuits. From 1504 to 1508, he compiled the Chronicon Pisauri, a compilation of notes about legal sources that are now lost. In 1511, he finished the Tractatus de praestantia doctorum, a biographical treatise on the most influential jurists of Antiquity and the Middle Ages.

In 1517, Diplovataccio moved to Venice, where, as a publisher of note, he edited De regulis iuris of Dinus, the Commentaria of de Tartagnis and the works of Bartolus, among others. On behalf of the city, he compiled two histories of Venice. Disappointed by their meager success, he moved back to Pesaro, where he spent his last years as an influential member of the city's senate.
