= Constantine Lips =

Byzantine aristocrat and admiral

Constantine Lips (Greek: Κωνσταντίνος Λίψ) (died 20 August 917) was a Byzantine aristocrat and admiral who lived in the later 9th and early 10th centuries. He was killed in 917 at the Battle of Acheloos against Bulgaria. Constantine Lips is most notable for his foundation of the convent bearing his name at Constantinople.

== Biography ==
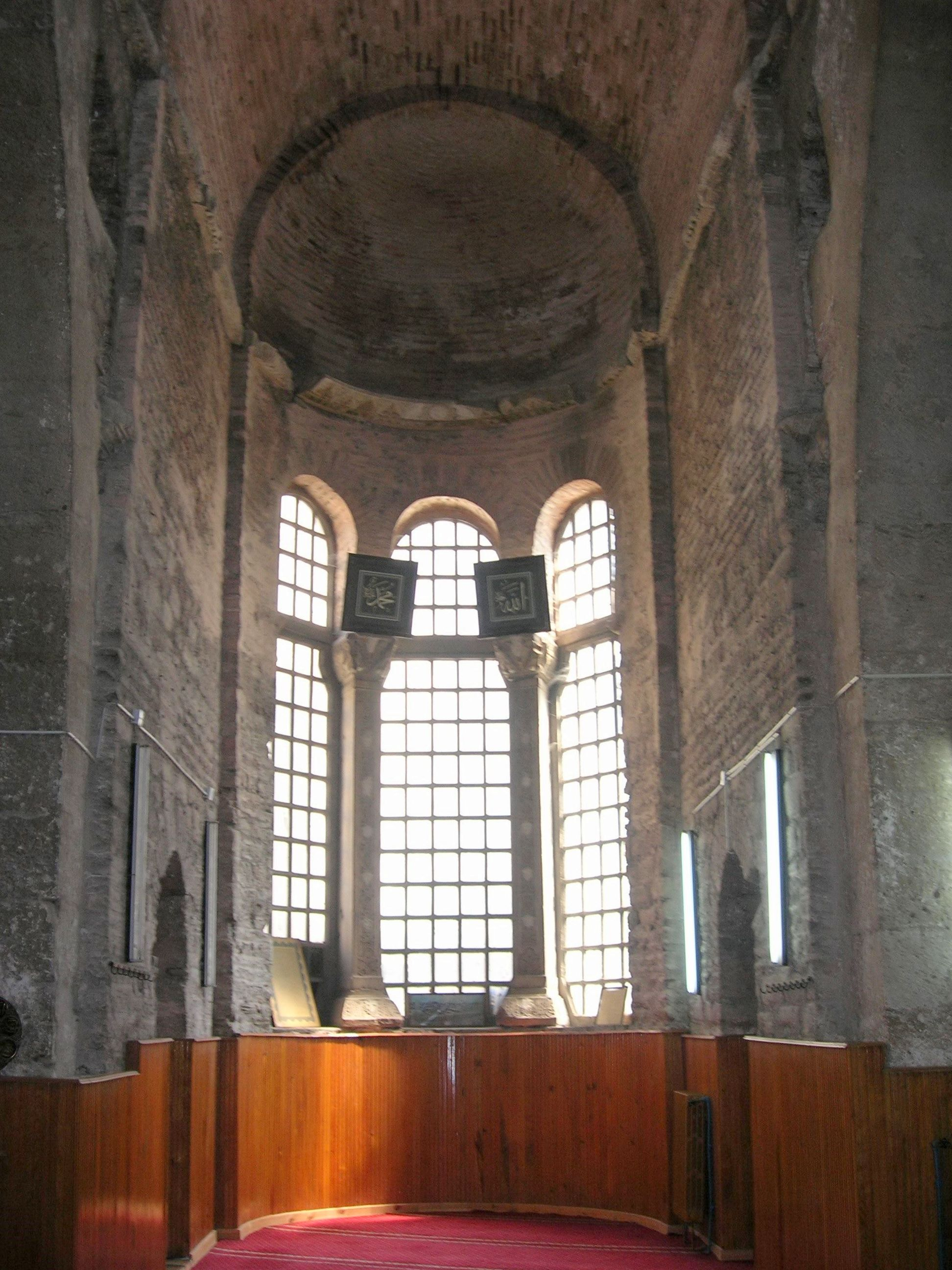
Interior of the Theotokos Panachrantos church, erected by Lips

The facts regarding Constantine's life are confused and subject to conjecture. It is known that at the time of Emperor Leo VI the Wise (r. 886–912), he restored a monastery near the Church of the Holy Apostles, which is nowadays identified with the Fenari Isa Mosque on account of a partial inscription commemorating its dedication to the Theotokos. The date of the inauguration is traditionally placed in 907/908. Constantine Lips also participated in the failed coup of the prominent general Constantine Doukas against the infant Constantine VII Porphyrogennetos (r. 913–959) in July 913, after the death of Leo's brother and successor Alexander (r. 912–913). In its wake, several nobles who had been or were suspected of being involved in the coup were executed, while others fled the city, amongst them Constantine Lips. On August 20, 917, he fell at the Battle of Acheloos, fighting against the Bulgarian forces under Simeon I.

He is also equated by modern scholarship with two other people named Lips, whose activities are believed to have been erroneously post-dated. The first is recorded by Constantine VII as having held the rank of protospatharios and the court post of domestikos of the hypourgia (head assistant to the epi tes trapezes), later (probably by the time of the 913 coup attempt) rising to become a patrikios and megas hetaireiarches. He also served on several occasions as imperial envoy to Gregory I, the ruler of the Armenian principality of Taron. On the first embassy, he returned with Gregory's son Ashot, who was received by Leo and named protospatharios. Lips accompanied Ashot back to his father, and returned with Gregory's brother (known only by his Arabic name Abu Ghanim), who was also given the rank of protospatharios. Constantine accompanied Abu Ghanim on his return journey. When the latter visited Constantinople again some years later, he was married to Constantine's daughter. In another mission shortly after, Lips persuaded Gregory himself to visit Constantinople, where he was lavishly received and given the supreme dignity of magistros and the title of strategos of Taron. After a prolonged sojourn, he was escorted to his domains by Lips.

The later Patria of Constantinople also refer to a Lips, patrikios and Droungarios of the Fleet, who established a monastery and a guest house during the late reign of Constantine VII, but it is impossible to tell with certainty whether this is the same person.

Constantine Lips had a son, the patrikios Bardas Lips, who was involved in a conspiracy against Emperor Romanos II (r. 959–963) in 962. He is also the last known representative of the Lips family.

== Sources ==
- Guilland, Rodolphe (1967). Recherches sur les Institutions Byzantines, Tome II (in French). Berlin: Akademie-Verlag.
- Kazhdan, Alexander, ed. (1991). The Oxford Dictionary of Byzantium. New York and Oxford: Oxford University Press. ISBN 978-0-19-504652-6.
- Lilie, Ralph-Johannes; Ludwig, Claudia; Zielke, Beate; Pratsch, Thomas, eds. (2013). "Prosopographie der mittelbyzantinischen Zeit Online". Prosopographie der mittelbyzantinischen Zeit Online. Berlin-Brandenburgische Akademie der Wissenschaften. Nach Vorarbeiten F. Winkelmanns erstellt (in German). De Gruyter.
- van Millingen, Alexander (1912). Byzantine Churches of Constantinople. London, United Kingdom: MacMillan & Company.
- Whittow, Mark (1996). The Making of Byzantium, 600–1025. Berkeley and Los Angeles, California: University of California Press. ISBN 0-520-20496-4.
