= Abu Ghanim =

Armenian nobleman from the 9th/10th century

Abu Ghanim (Armenian: Abułanam; Greek: Ἀπογάνεμ, Apoganem) was an Armenian noble of the Bagratid family and ruler of part of the southern Armenian region of Taron at the turn of the 9th/10th century.

Abu Ghanim was the brother of Prince Grigor I of Taron, and was himself the de facto ruler of about one half of the principality. Like other Armenian figures of the period, he is only known to history by his Arabic name, over which opinions vary: some scholars consider it a mere nickname or calling name, others consider it a proper baptismal name. According to the De administrando imperio of the Byzantine emperor Constantine VII Porphyrogennetos (r. 913–959), Abu Ghanim and his nephews, the "sons of Arkaikas"—"Arkaikas" has been identified with either Ashot II of Taron or his father David—accompanied the Byzantine emissary Constantine Lips to the Byzantine capital, Constantinople, during the reign of Leo VI the Wise (r. 886–912) and received the rank of protospatharios. The visit was repeated sometime after, variously dated by modern scholars at ca. 900 or between 906 and Leo's death in 912. During this visit, Abu Ghanim received the title of patrikios, and a marriage between Abu Ghanim and the daughter of Constantine Lips was arranged. The wedding never took place, however, because Abu Ghanim died during a journey to his homeland, before he could return to Constantinople. Abu Ghanim was apparently already married once, for he is recorded as having one or more underage sons at the time of his death: his only clearly attested son is Tornikes, but there were possibly more, who are named in modern Armenian sources as Vahan and Smbat.

== Sources ==
- Lilie, Ralph-Johannes; Ludwig, Claudia; Pratsch, Thomas; Zielke, Beate (2013). Prosopographie der mittelbyzantinischen Zeit Online. Berlin-Brandenburgische Akademie der Wissenschaften. Nach Vorarbeiten F. Winkelmanns erstellt (in German). Berlin and Boston: De Gruyter.
