= Constantine Palaiologos (son of Michael VIII) =

Byzantine prince

- Porphyrogennetos
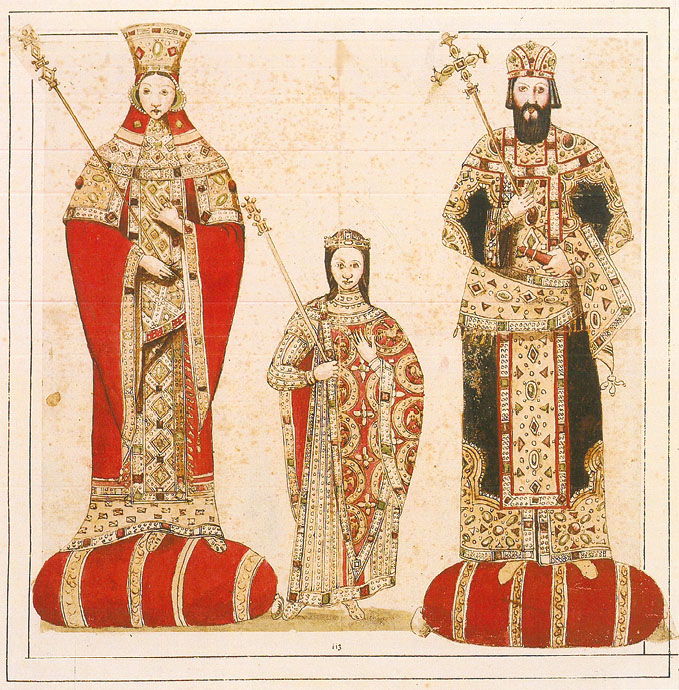
- Constantine Palaiologos (middle) with his father and mother
- Emperors: Andronikos II Palaiologos; Michael VIII Palaiologos
- Born: 1261; Constantinople
- Died: 5 May 1306 (aged 44–45)
- Burial: Lips Monastery
- Spouse: EIrene Palaiologina Raoulaina
- Issue: John Palaiologos
- Dynasty: Palaiologos
- Father: Michael VIII Palaiologos
- Mother: Theodora Palaiologina

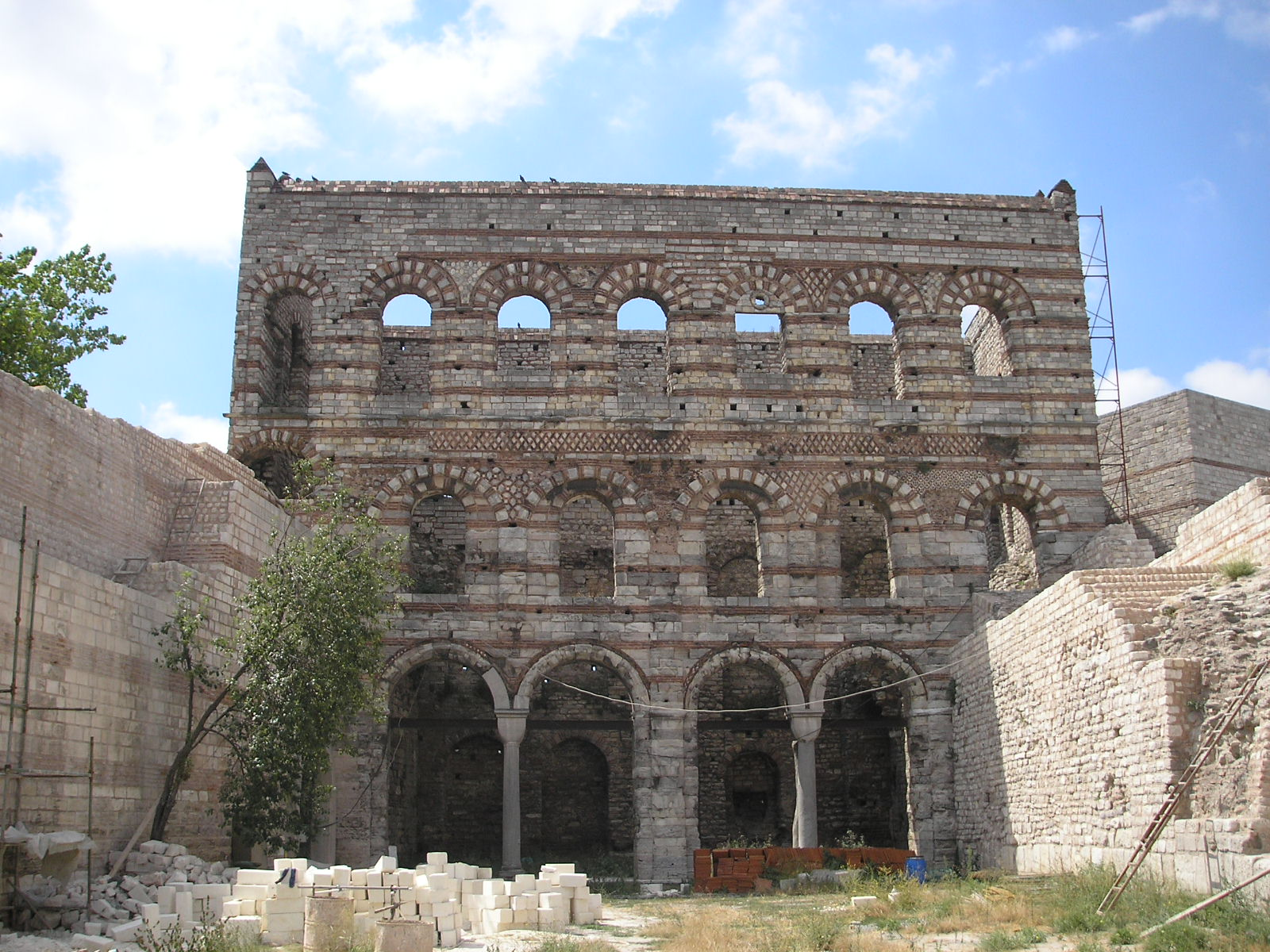
The northern facade of the Palace of the Porphyrogenitus

Constantine Palaiologos or Palaeologus (Greek: Κωνσταντῖνος Παλαιολόγος; 1261 – 5 May 1306) was a Byzantine prince of the Palaiologos dynasty, who also served as a general in the wars against the Serbs and Turks.

== Biography ==
Constantine was the third son of Emperor Michael VIII Palaiologos (r. 1259–1282) and Theodora Palaiologina. He was born in autumn 1261 in Constantinople, which had just been recovered from the Latin Empire in August. He was hence a true porphyrogennetos ("purple-born") prince, and was often referred to as such. His father reportedly accorded him honours above even those of a despotes.

In 1280, Constantine fought against the Serbs in Macedonia, and was then dispatched against the Turkish raiders in Asia Minor, where he was successful in clearing the Maeander River valley of their presence. He later rebuilt the famous Monastery of Stoudios in Constantinople. In 1293, he was slandered to his brother, Emperor Andronikos II Palaiologos (r. 1282–1328), and placed under arrest. He later became a monk, with the monastic name Athanasios. He died at Constantinople on 5 May 1306, and was buried at the Lips Monastery.

From his marriage to Irene Palaiologina Raoulaina, he had one son, the panhypersebastos John Palaiologos.

The Palace of the Porphyrogenitus is a late 13th-century Byzantine palace in the north-western part of the old city of Constantinople named after him.
