= Fenari Isa Mosque =

Mosque in Istanbul, Turkey

Fenâri Îsâ Mosque Lips Monastery Fenâri Îsâ Câmîi
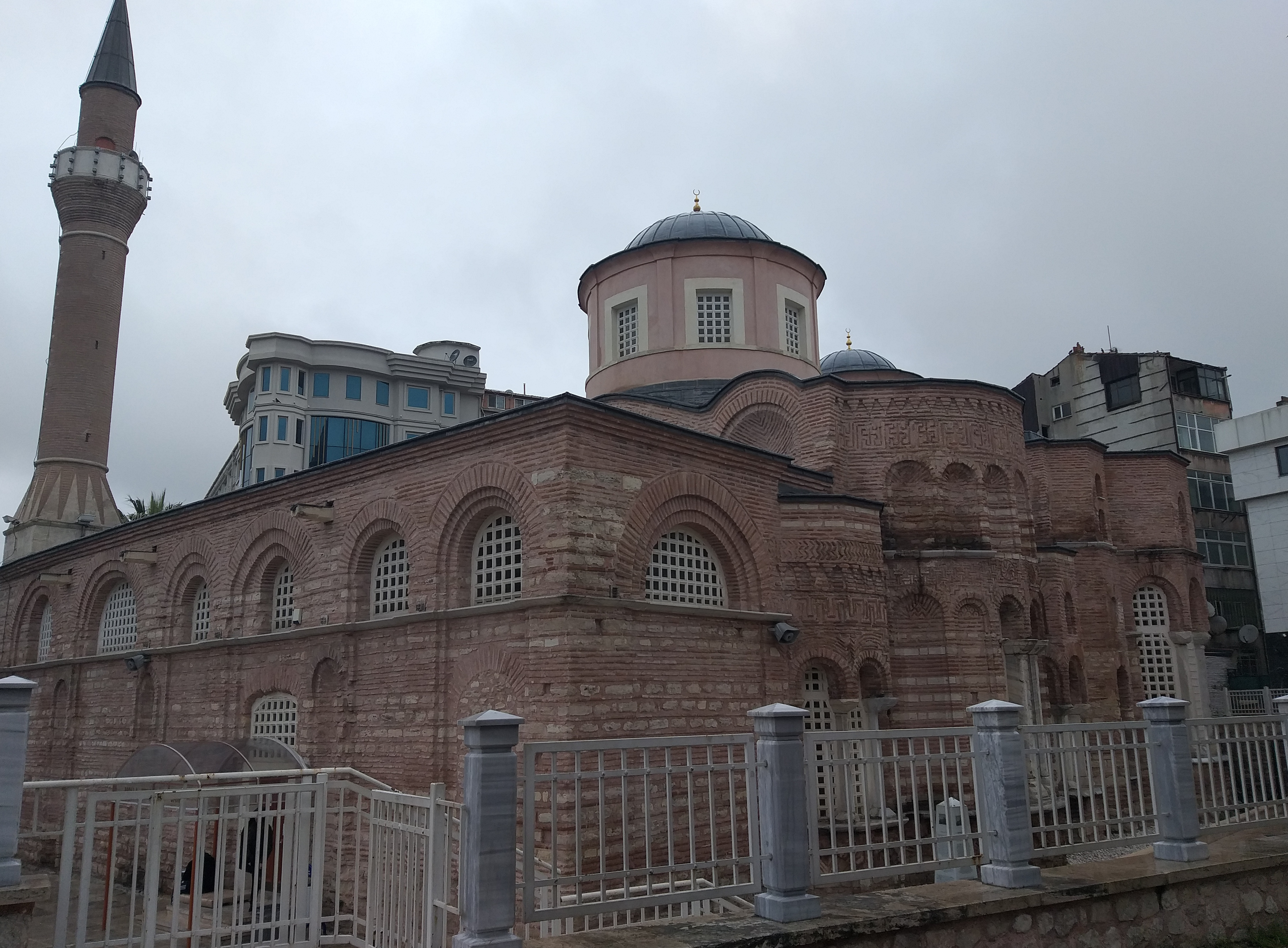
- Side view of the Mosque, formerly the Church of St. John the Baptist, Recently restored as of 2022

- Location in the Fatih district of Istanbul

Religion
- Affiliation: Sunni Islam
- Year consecrated: 1497

Location
- Location: Istanbul, Turkey
- Coordinates: 41°0′55.37″N 28°56′38.40″E

Architecture
- Type: church with cross-in-square plan (North church) and square plan (south church)
- Style: Byzantine
- Groundbreaking: 908
- Completed: 1304

Specifications
- Minaret: 1
- Materials: brick, stone

Fenâri Îsâ Mosque (full name in Turkish: Molla Fenâri Îsâ Câmîi), known in Byzantine times as the Lips Monastery (Greek: Μονὴ τοῦ Λιβός), is a mosque in Istanbul, made of two former Eastern Orthodox churches.

== Location ==
The place of worship is located on Adnan Menderes Boulevard, also known as Vatan Street, in the Fatih district of Istanbul. It is between the Fatih-Emniyet and Aksaray stops on the M1 line of the Istanbul Metro; It can also be easily reached from IETT's İskenderpaşa or Oğuzhan stops.

== History ==
=== Byzantine period ===
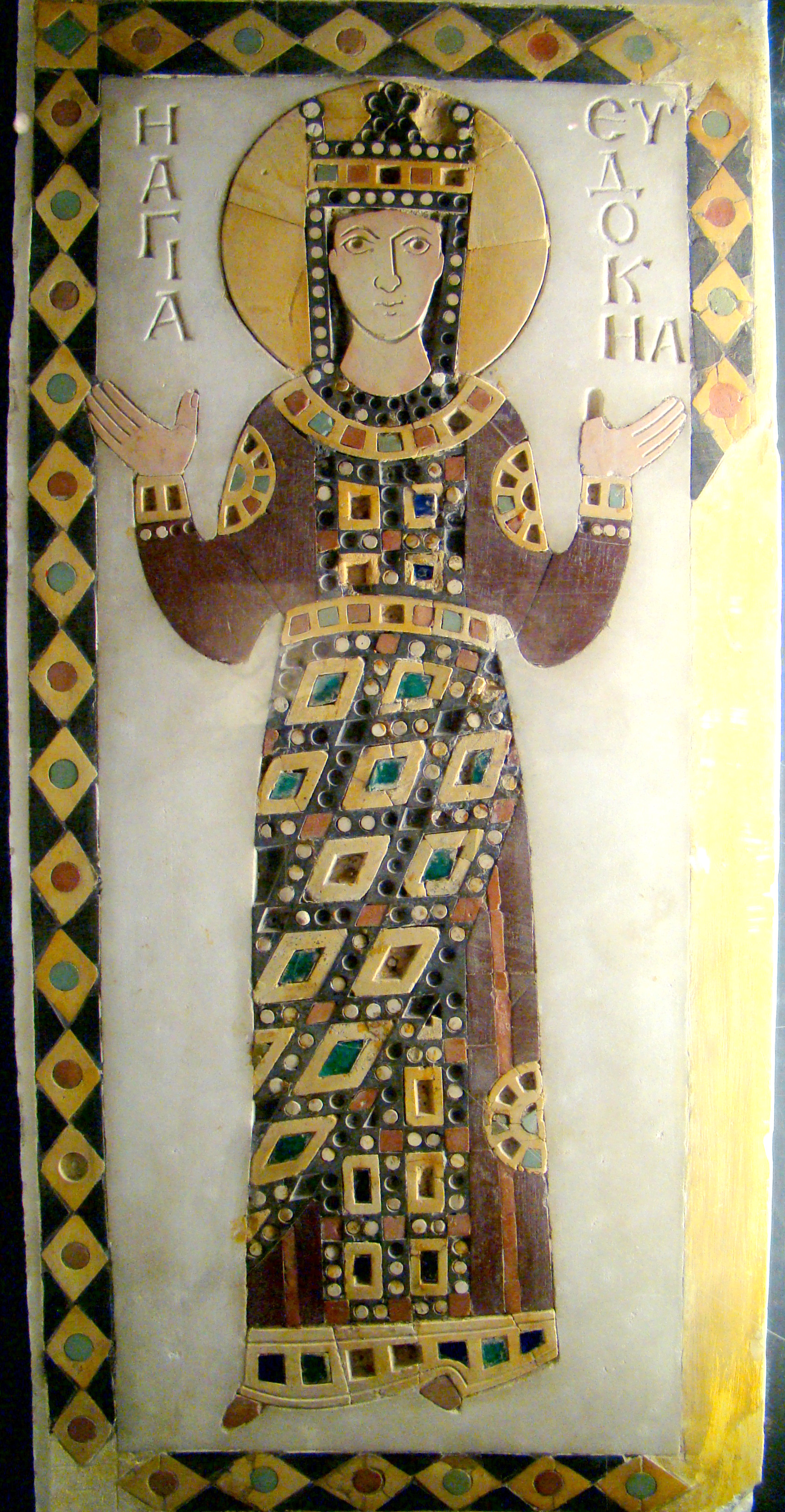
Coloured stone inlay on marble (Opus sectile) depicting Empress Aelia Eudocia as a Saint, 10th or 11th century, previously in the church, now in Istanbul Archaeological Museum.

In 908, the Byzantine admiral Constantine Lips inaugurated a nunnery in the presence of the Emperor Leo VI the Wise (r. 886–912). The nunnery was dedicated to the Virgin Theotokos Panachrantos ("Immaculate Mother of God") in a place called "Merdosangaris" (Greek: Μερδοσαγγάρης), in the valley of the Lycus (the river of Constantinople). The nunnery was known also after his name (Monē tou Libos), and became one of the largest of Constantinople.

The church was built on the remains of another shrine from the 6th century, and used the tombstones of an ancient Roman cemetery. Relics of Saint Irene were stored here. The church is generally known as "North Church".

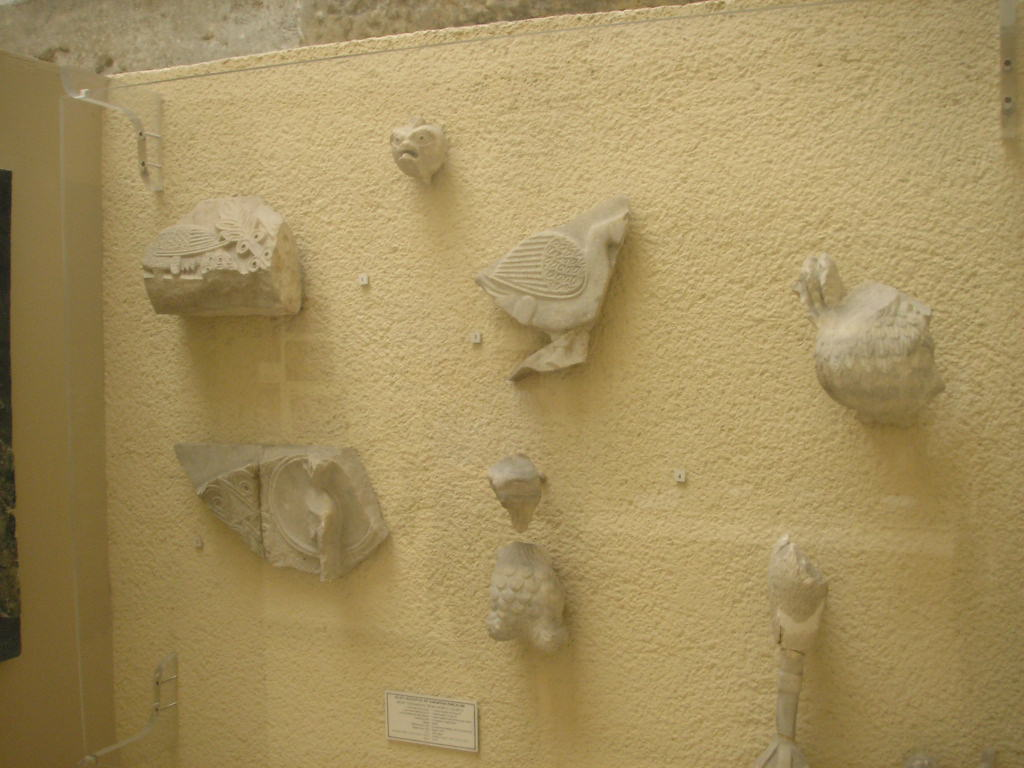
Byzantine remains from the North Church (kept in the Istanbul Archaeological Museums).

After the Latin invasion and the restoration of the Byzantine Empire, between 1286 and 1304, Empress Theodora, widow of Emperor Michael VIII Palaiologos (r. 1259–1282), erected another church dedicated to St. John the Baptist (Ἐκκλησία τοῦ Ἁγίου Ἰωάννου Προδρόμου τοῦ Λιβός) south of the first church. Several exponents of the imperial dynasty of the Palaiologos were buried there besides Theodora: her son Constantine, Empress Irene of Montferrat and her husband Emperor Andronikos II (r. 1282–1328). This church is generally known as the "South Church". The Empress restored also the nunnery, which by that time had been possibly abandoned. According to its typikon, the nunnery at that time hosted a total of 50 women and also a Xenon for laywomen with 15 beds attached.

During the 14th century an esonarthex and a parekklesion were added to the church. The custom of burying members of the imperial family in the complex continued in the 15th century with Anna, first wife of Emperor John VIII Palaiologos (r. 1425–1448), in 1417. The church was possibly used as a cemetery also after 1453.

=== Ottoman period ===
In 1497–1498, shortly after the Fall of Constantinople and during the reign of Sultan Beyazid II (1481–1512), the south church was converted into a mescit (a small mosque) by the Ottoman dignitary Fenarizade Alâeddin Ali ben Yusuf Effendi, Qadi 'asker of Rumeli, and nephew of Molla Şemseddin Fenari, whose family belonged to the religious class of the ulema. He built a minaret in the southeast angle, and a mihrab in the apse. Since one of the head preachers of the madrasah was named Îsâ ("Jesus" in Arabic and Turkish), his name was added to that of the mosque. The edifice burned down in 1633, was restored in 1636 by Grand Vizier Bayram Pasha, who upgraded the building to cami ("mosque") and converted the north church into a tekke (a dervish lodge). In this occasion the columns of the north church were substituted with piers, the two domes were renovated, and the mosaic decoration was removed. After another fire in 1782, the complex was restored again in 1847/48. In this occasion also the columns of the south church were substituted with piers, and the balustrade parapets of the narthex were removed too. The building burned once more in 1918, and was abandoned. During excavations performed in 1929, twenty-two sarcophagi have been found. The complex has been thoroughly restored between the 1950s and 1960s by the Byzantine Institute of America, and since then serves again as a mosque.

== Architecture and decoration ==
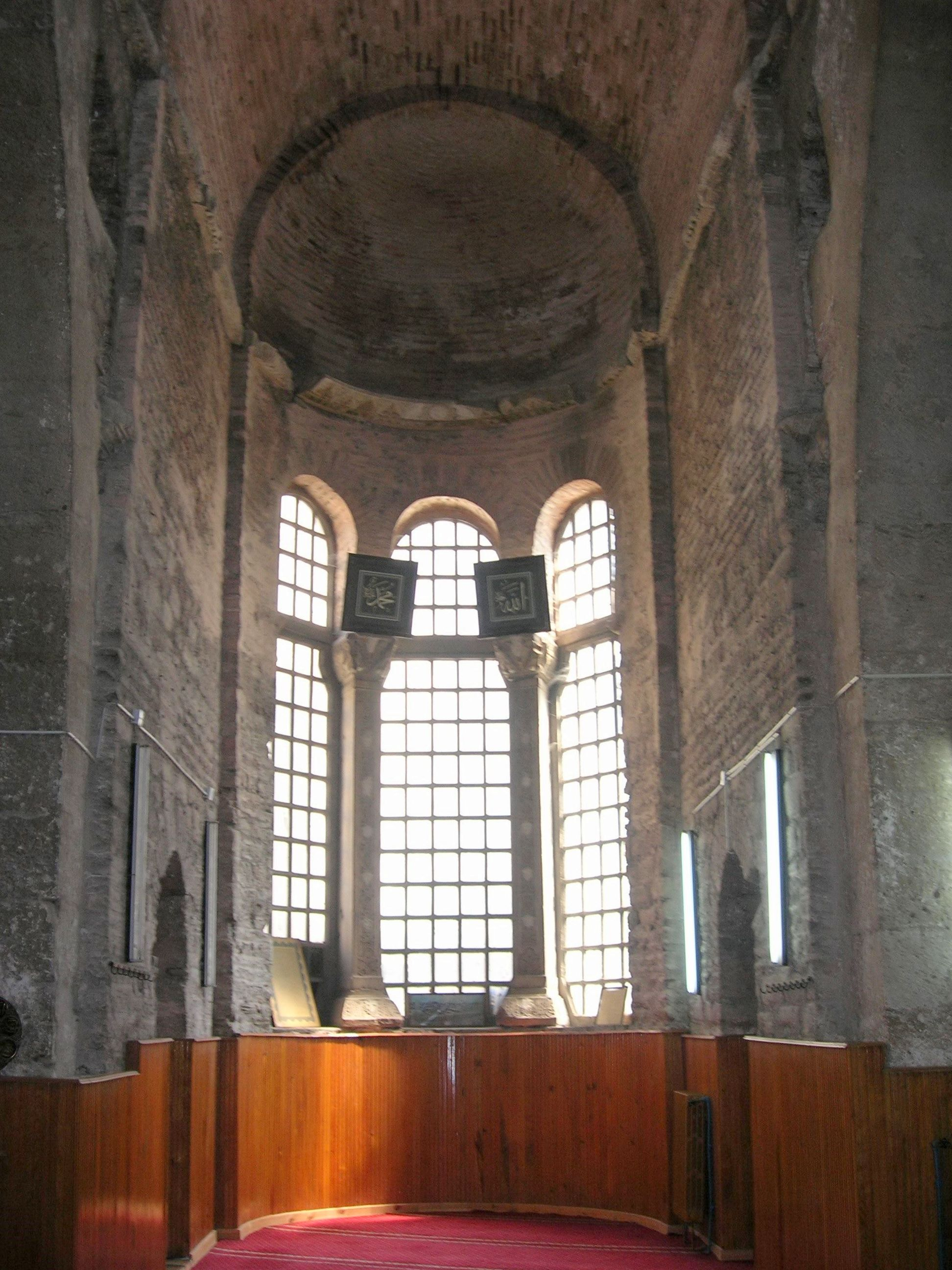
Interior of the North Church.

=== North church ===
The north church has an unusual quincuncial (cross-in-square) plan, and was one of the first shrines in Constantinople to adopt this plan, whose prototype is possibly the Nea Ekklesia ("New Church"), erected in Constantinople in the year 880, of which no remains are extant. During the Ottoman period the four columns have been replaced with two pointed arches which span the whole church.

The dimensions of the north church are small: the naos is 13 metres (43 feet) long and 9.5 metres (31.2 feet) wide, and was sized according to the population living in the monastery at that time. The masonry of the northern church was erected by alternating courses of bricks and small rough stone blocks. In this technique, which is typical of the Byzantine architecture of the 10th century, the bricks sink in a thick bed of mortar. The building is topped by an Ottoman dome pierced by eight windows.

This edifice has three high apses: the central one is polygonal, and is flanked by the other two, which served as pastophoria: prothesis and diakonikon.

The apses are interrupted by triple (by the central one)and single lancet windows. The walls of the central arms of the naos cross have two orders of windows: the lower order has triple lancet windows, the higher semicircular windows. Two long parekklesia, each one ended by a low apse, flanks the presbytery of the naos. The angular and central bays are very slender. At the four edges of the building are four small roof chapels, each surmounted by a cupola.

The remainders of the original decoration of this church are the bases of three of the four columns of the central bay, and many original decorating elements, which survive on the pillars of the windows and on the frame of the dome. The decoration consisted originally in marble panels and coloured tiles: the vaults were decorated with mosaic. Only spurs of it are now visible.

As a whole, the north church presents strong analogies with the Bodrum Mosque (the church of Myrelaion).

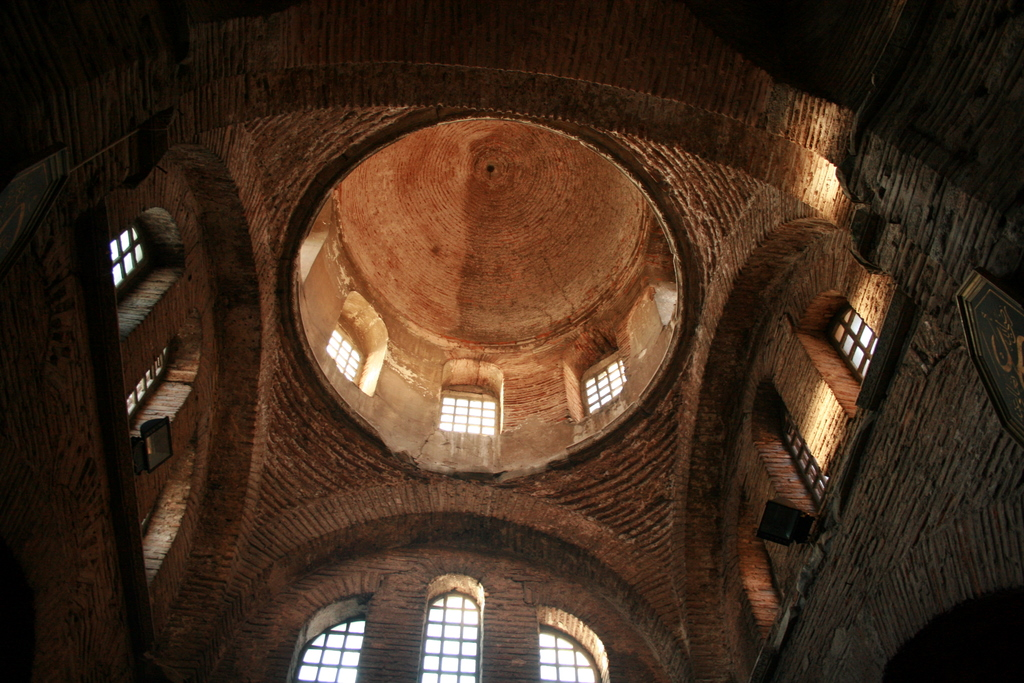
North Church Dome.

=== South church ===
The south church is a square room surmounted by a dome, and surrounded by two deambulatoria, an esonarthex and a parekklesion (added later). The north deambulatorium is the south parekklesion of the north church. This multiplication of spaces around the central part of the church, typical of late Palaiologian architecture, was motivated by the need for more space for tombs, monuments erected to benefactors of the church, etc. The central room is divided from the aisles by a triple arcade. During the mass the believers were confined in the deambulatoria, which were shallow and dark, and could barely see what happened in the central part of the church.

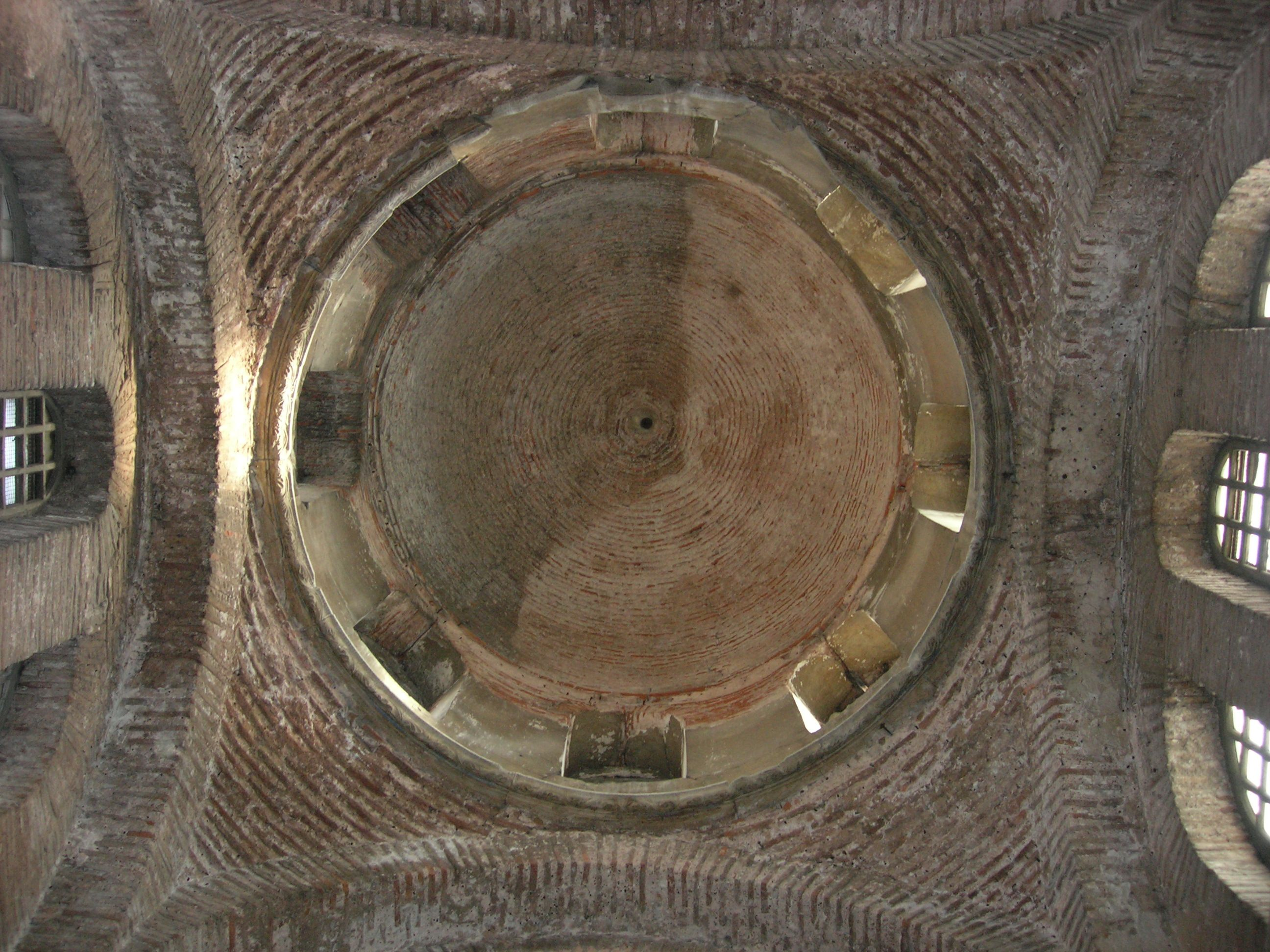
The Dome of the Church of St. John the Baptist.

The masonry is composed of alternated courses of bricks and stone, typical of late Byzantine architecture in Constantinople.

The lush decoration of the south and of the main apses (the latter is heptagonal), is made of a triple order of niches, the middle order being alternated with triple windows. The bricks are arranged to form patterns like arches, hooks, Greek frets, sun crosses, swastikas and fans. Between these patterns are white and dark red bands, alternating one course of stone with two to five of bricks. This is the first appearance of this most important decorating aspect of Palaiologian architecture in Constantinople.

The church has an exonarthex surmounted by a gallery, which was extended to reach also the north church. The parekklesion was erected alongside the southern side of the south church, and was connected with the esonarthex, so that the room surrounds the whole complex on the west and south side. Several marble sarcophagi are placed within it.

As a whole, this complex represents a notable example of middle and late Byzantine Architecture in Istanbul.

== Restorations ==
The building has undergone several restorational periods, starting from the Byzantine times. Since then, many changes have been implemented in the structure, and it carries a multilayered archaeological value.

In the repair record dated 1898, it is written that the cracks in the surrounding, dome, and drum walls of the building were filled with pitch pine and cement to strengthen them, and that they were plastered with sand and linen mortar and painted. It is also learned from the documents that the stitching method was applied at that time using pitch pine and linen mortar to close the cracks that occurred in the walls of the building after the earthquake.

Archaeological studies were carried out in 1929 in the building, which suffered a great fire in 1918. During these excavations, it was understood that the ground was raised by 80 cm during the Ottoman period, and many findings were found in this filled ground.

The building was reopened as a mosque with the restoration carried out in 1960, and its minaret, which was demolished in 1942, was rebuilt in the following years. Due to the effect of Vatan St., which was opened to traffic in the 1950s, the building remained 2–3 meters below the road level. The roof of the building was damaged in 2000. The comprehensive restoration work, which started in 2012, finished in 2019.

=== Building pathologies found during the 2012-2019 restorations, and their proposed interventions ===
The 2012-2019 restorations were carried out after studying the previous repair interventions to the building. Addressing the decays and deteriorations, and providing proper solutions to these problems were among the goals of the restoration. In the section below, the mentioned pathologies are detailed further.

=== Unskilled repair interventions ===
The lower part of the narthex window on the north facade of the building has been partially covered with brick and cement-based plaster. In the south dome, instead of the stone jamb that has disappeared, a marble sill piece and a lintel have been created, and a different stone and brick, and cement-based integration have been made on top of it. There are unqualified braids on the edges of some of the lower rows of windows on the west facade and inside the arches on the north and south of the main entrance door.

== See also ==
- Ancient Roman and Byzantine domes

== Sources ==
- Van Millingen, Alexander (1912). Byzantine Churches of Constantinople. London: MacMillan & Co.
- Janin, Raymond (1964). Constantinople Byzantine (in French) (2 ed.). Paris: Institut Français d'Etudes Byzantines.
- Eyice, Semavi (1955). Istanbul. Petite Guide a travers les Monuments Byzantins et Turcs (in French). Istanbul: Istanbul Matbaası.
- Gülersoy, Çelik (1976). A guide to Istanbul. Istanbul: Istanbul Kitaplığı. OCLC 3849706.
- Mathews, Thomas F. (1976). The Byzantine Churches of Istanbul: A Photographic Survey. University Park: Pennsylvania State University Press. ISBN 0-271-01210-2.
- Müller-Wiener, Wolfgang (1977). Bildlexikon zur Topographie Istanbuls: Byzantion, Konstantinupolis, Istanbul bis zum Beginn d. 17 Jh (in German). Tübingen: Wasmuth. ISBN 978-3-8030-1022-3.
- Krautheimer, Richard (1986). Architettura paleocristiana e bizantina (in Italian). Turin: Einaudi. ISBN 88-06-59261-0. (Note. While the page numbers in the citations refer to the Italian edition, an English edition - not as up-to-date as the Italian one - is also available: Krautheimer, Richard (1984). Early Christian and Byzantine Architecture (Fourth ed.). Yale University Press. ISBN 978-0-300-05294-7.)
- Freely, John (2000). Blue Guide Istanbul. W. W. Norton & Company. ISBN 0-393-32014-6.
- Talbot, Alice-Mary (2001). "Building Activity under Andronikos II". In Necipoğlu, Nevra (ed.). Byzantine Constantinople: Monuments, Topography and everyday Life. Leiden, Boston, Köln: Brill. ISBN 90-04-11625-7.
