= Libadarios =

Byzantine surname

Libadarios (Greek Λιβαδάριος)—feminine Libadaria (Note: Also spelled Libadarea.) (Λιβαδαρέα), plural Libadarioi (Λιβαδάριοι) (Note: Also spelled Livadarioi.)—was the surname of a Byzantine family of the 13th century.

The Libadarioi were a new family that first came to prominence in the Empire of Nicaea (1204–1261). They were considered one of the leading aristocratic families of the empire by George Pachymeres, and one of just five such new families. They held high civil and military office under the Palaiologoi. They may have been related to the Demetrios Libadas who held office (probably under the megas logariastes) in 1186. The first recorded Libadarios was a relative of the Mouzalon family. They were probably unrelated to the Limpidarios family that rose to prominence in the army and navy in the 14th century.

== Members ==
- Michael Libadarios was megas hetaireiarches in 1241 at the court of Theodore II in Pegai.
- A Libadarios who was pinkernes under Michael VIII married his daughter to the emperor's son, Theodore Palaiologos.
- A Libadarios who was megas chartoularios and strategos of Tralles was defeated by the Turks around 1280.
- A Libadarios who was protovestiarites and later megas stratopedarches was appointed governor of Neokastra sometime before 1293. He remained loyal to the Palaiologoi during the campaigns and subsequent rebellion of Alexios Philanthropenos. He bribed Alexios' mercenaries to betray him and then had him blinded in December 1295.
- A Libadaria, the wife of a megas stratopedarches (possibly the former), established a convent for nuns in Thessaloniki sometime before 1326.
- Theodore Komnenos Libadarios founded a monastery dedicated to Mary around 1300 and also commissioned paintings for the monastery of Saint George in Servia.
