= Isaac Doukas Vatatzes =

Byzantine prince (c. 1188–1261)

Isaac Doukas Vatatzes (Greek: Ἰσαάκιος Δούκας Βατάτζης, romanized: Isaakios Doukas Vatatzēs; c. 1188–1261) was the brother of the Nicaean emperor John III Doukas Vatatzes (r. 1222–1254).

== Life ==
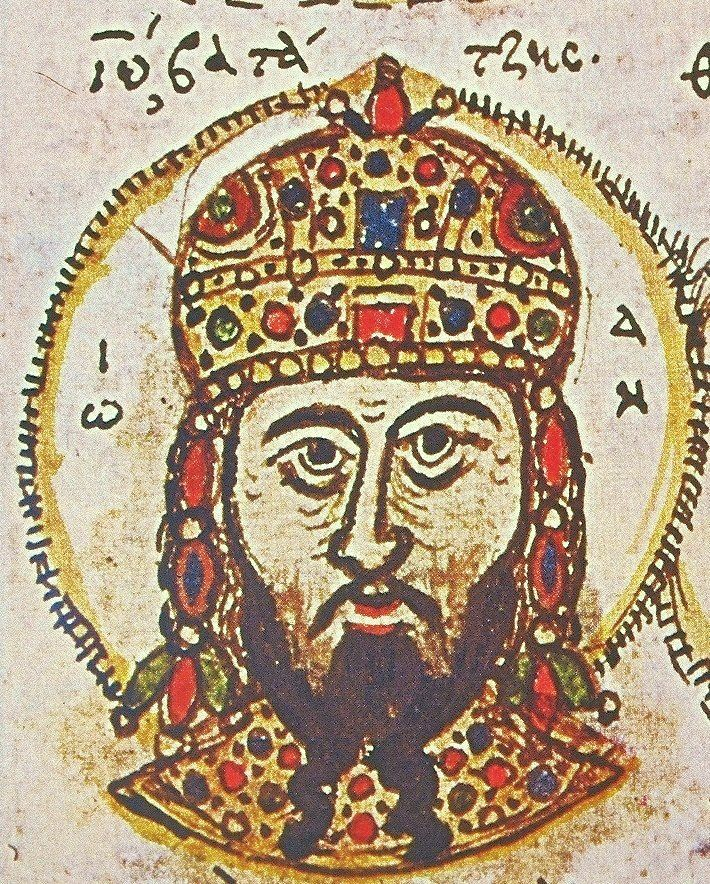
15th-century portrait of Isaac's brother, Emperor John III Doukas Vatatzes

His exact origin is obscure: probably born c. 1188, he was the oldest of three brothers, alongside John III (the youngest) and an anonymous middle brother. Their parents are unknown, but are considered by modern scholars likely to have been the general Basil Vatatzes and his unknown wife, who was a cousin to the Byzantine emperors Isaac II Angelos and Alexios III Angelos. Like his brother John III, Isaac appears to have dropped the surname "Vatatzes" and was known only as "Isaac Doukas".

Very little is known about his life. He held the rank of sebastokrator in 1253, and in 1261, he was present at the signing of the Treaty of Nymphaeum with the Republic of Genoa, holding the rank of pansebastos sebastos and the position of parakoimomenos of the great seal (sphendone). He was then sent on an embassy to Genoa to ratify the treaty, along with Theodore Krivitziotes and Leo, archdeacon of the Hagia Sophia. Isaac died during the negotiations, and was buried in the Genoa Cathedral.

== Family ==
He had at least two children: a son named John, who died young, and an anonymous daughter who married Constantine Strategopoulos. John married Eudokia Angelina and was the father of Empress Theodora Palaiologina, wife of Michael VIII Palaiologos (r. 1259–1282), founder of the Palaiologos dynasty.

== Sources ==
- Geanakoplos, Deno John (1959). Emperor Michael Palaeologus and the West, 1258–1282: A Study in Byzantine-Latin Relations. Cambridge, Massachusetts: Harvard University Press.
- Macrides, Ruth (2007). George Akropolites: The History – Introduction, Translation and Commentary. Oxford: Oxford University Press. ISBN 978-0-19-921067-1.
- Polemis, Demetrios I. (1968). The Doukai: A Contribution to Byzantine Prosopography. London: The Athlone Press.
- Trapp, Erich; Beyer, Hans-Veit; Walther, Rainer; Sturm-Schnabl, Katja; Kislinger, Ewald; Leontiadis, Ioannis; Kaplaneres, Sokrates (1976–1996). Prosopographisches Lexikon der Palaiologenzeit (in German). Vienna: Verlag der Österreichischen Akademie der Wissenschaften. ISBN 3-7001-3003-1.
- Varzos, Konstantinos (1984). Η Γενεαλογία των Κομνηνών [The Genealogy of the Komnenoi] (PDF) (in Greek). Vol. B. Thessaloniki: Centre for Byzantine Studies, University of Thessaloniki.
