= Demetrios Palaiologos (son of Andronikos II) =

Demetrios Angelos Doukas Palaiologos (Greek: Δημήτριος Ἄγγελος Δούκας Παλαιολόγος; c. 1295 – after 1343) was a son of the Byzantine emperor Andronikos II Palaiologos (r. 1282–1328) and his second wife, Irene of Montferrat.

== Life ==
Born c. 1295, Demetrios was the youngest of Andronikos II's sons who survived childhood.

In c. 1304, he was sent to the court of the Serbian ruler Stephen Uroš II Milutin, intended to become his successor; his stay there was short, however, and he soon returned to Constantinople. In 1306 he was named to the highest court rank, that of Despot.

In the Byzantine civil war of 1321–1328, between his father and his nephew, Andronikos III Palaiologos, Demetrios sided with the former. In 1327–1328, during the last stage of the civil war, he served as governor of Thessalonica, although he may have been appointed to the post as early as 1322. Eventually he was forced to flee to Serbia, while Andronikos III managed to take his wife and children captive. Nevertheless, Demetrios returned to Constantinople sometime after Andronikos III's final victory.

Demetrios was accused of conspiring against his nephew in 1336/37, but Andronikos III dropped the charges. Nothing more is known of him after 1343.

Demetrios was also an accomplished theologian and miniature painter. The identity of his wife is not established, but she was possibly Theodora Komnene. By her he had a daughter, the future empress Irene, and at least one other, unnamed, child.

== Sources ==
- Trapp, Erich; Beyer, Hans-Veit; Walther, Rainer; Sturm-Schnabl, Katja; Kislinger, Ewald; Leontiadis, Ioannis; Kaplaneres, Sokrates (1976–1996). Prosopographisches Lexikon der Palaiologenzeit (in German). Vienna: Verlag der Österreichischen Akademie der Wissenschaften. ISBN 3-7001-3003-1.
