= Theodora Palaiologina (Byzantine empress) =

- Augusta
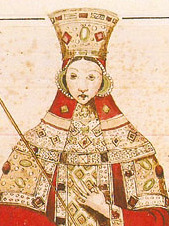
- Replicated miniature of Theodora

Byzantine empress consort
- Tenure: 1259–1282
- Born: Theodora Doukaina Vatatzaina c. 1240
- Died: 4 March 1303
- Spouse: Michael VIII Palaiologos
- Issue more...: Irene Palaiologina; Andronikos II Palaiologos; Constantine Palaiologos; Eudokia Palaiologina; Theodore Palaiologos
Regnal name
- Theodora Doukaina Komnene Palaiologina (Note: The surnames "Komnene Palaiologina" were likely adopted from Michael VIII, whose full name was "Michael Doukas Angelos Komnenos Palaiologos". They were both descendants of Constantine Angelos and Theodora (Doukaina) Komnene.)
- House: Doukas Vatatzes
- Father: John Doukas Vatatzes
- Mother: Eudokia Angelina
- Religion: Eastern Orthodox
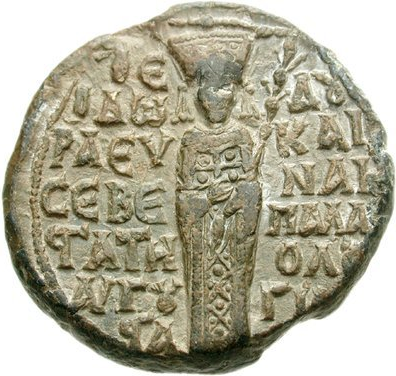
- Seal

Theodora Doukaina Komnene Palaiologina (Greek: Θεοδώρα Δούκαινα Κομνηνή Παλαιολογίνα; c. 1240 – 4 March 1303), also known as Theodora Vatatzaina (Greek: Θεοδώρα Βατάτζαινα), was the empress consort of the Byzantine emperor Michael VIII Palaiologos.

== Life ==
Theodora was a daughter of John Doukas and Eudokia Angelina. Her paternal grandfather was sebastokrator Isaac Doukas Vatatzes (died 1261), the older brother of the Nicaean emperor John III Doukas Vatatzes (r. 1221–1254). Theodora's maternal grandfather was protostrator John Angelos; his name indicates he was a member of the Angelos family, but his exact relations to the reigning members of the family are not known.

=== Empress of Nicaea ===
Acropolites mentions that the father of Theodora died in young adulthood. Her mother died in the early 1250s. Leaving Theodora to be raised by her great-uncle John III who was said to have "loved her like a daughter". In 1253, John III arranged the marriage of Theodora to Michael Palaiologos, who had been steadily rising in distinction due to a combination of familial connections and military abilities.

John III died on 3 November 1254. He was succeeded by his only son Theodore II Laskaris, who died four years later leaving his only son John IV Laskaris, a youth of seven. Michael maneuvered his way into first becoming regent of John IV, then advancing step by step to despotes making him next in order to Emperor. The final step came at the beginning of 1259 when Michael and John were crowned as co-emperors. There is no clear indication that Theodora was crowned empress at this time, but Alice-Mary Talbot notes the historian George Pachymeres contrasts the imperial couple with the young John who wore less impressive regalia.

=== Byzantine Empress ===
On 25 July 1261, Alexios Strategopoulos captured Constantinople, the capital of the Byzantine Empire that had been shattered by the Fourth Crusade. Michael took advantage of the success of his general and entered the city on 15 August 1261 and was soon followed by Theodora and their children. In September Michael was crowned Emperor a second time in the cathedral of Hagia Sophia; although D. Geanakoplos assumes that Theodora also received a second coronation, this is not expressly stated by Pachymeres.

About the time of this achievement, Theodora confronted a crisis in her marriage. According to Pachymeres, Michael became enamored of Anna-Constance of Hohenstaufen, who had been briefly married to John Vatatzes before his death; he offered to divorce Theodora if she would marry him. When Theodora learned of this, she turned to Patriarch Arsenios Autoreianos for help. The Patriarch confronted the emperor and pressured him to abandon his plans. Michael yielded and allow Anna to leave for home in December 1261. (Note: Geanakoplos is skeptical that Michael was ever enamored with Anna, and explains his dalliance as an attempt to form an alliance with Anna's brother Manfred of Sicily. When Anna rejected his advances, according to Geanakoplos, Michael dropped the proposal.)

There is little evidence for Theodora's political role in the reign of her husband. She took an interest in the marriages of her two daughters Anna and Irene. She also intervened to gain clemency for courtiers who fell into disfavor. The evidence of her activities primarily concern her support of monastic communities. A number of documents survive from the archives of the Patmos and Lembiotissa monasteries from the years 1259 to 1281 attesting to her active involvement. When Michael pursued a policy of church union at the Second Council of Lyons in 1274, there is evidence showing Theodora originally sympathized with the anti-unionists. When she failed to persuade Michael to change his mind, she apparently supported the policy out of loyalty to Michael for she was later forced to publicly recant in 1283.

=== Empress dowager ===
At some point after Michael's death in 1282, Theodora undertook the restoration of Lips monastery (now the Fenari Isa Mosque) which had been founded in the 10th century, and added a convent. In reconstructing the convent she added a second church, dedicated to St. John the Baptist. Talbot explains one motivation for her interest in the convent of Lips was to provide a place for her daughters and granddaughters to retire in their old age, per the current custom. Another was to provide a resting place for her family, having seen how Michael had been denied Christian burial. Talbot explains, "Theodora, as dowager empress and matriarch of the family, no doubt was determined to make provision for proper burial for herself and her descendants."

Lastly, Theodora played a role in supporting scholarship and promoting the production of manuscripts. For example, soon after the recovery of Constantinople, she commissioned the monk Arsenios to translate into Greek a work on geometry by the Persian philosopher al-Zanati. The tract is preserved in Naples manuscript (II C 33), with a note that provides information about Theodora's patronage.

Theodora died after a short illness on 4 March 1304. Her son the Emperor Andronikos II Palaiologos prepared a magnificent funeral, and she was laid to rest in the church of John the Baptist at Lips convent, where she had prepared her tomb some years earlier. The funeral oration was delivered by Theodore Metochites.

== Children ==
Theodora and Michael VIII had seven children:

- Manuel Palaiologos (c. 1255–before 1259)
- Irene Palaiologina (c. 1256–before 1328), who married emperor Ivan Asen III of Bulgaria
- Andronikos II Palaiologos (1259–1332)
- Anna Palaiologina (c. 1260–1299/1300), who married Demetrios/Michael Komnenos Doukas, third son of Michael II of Epirus
- Constantine Palaiologos (1261–1306), who married Eirene Raoulaina his second cousin
- Theodora Palaiologina, who married King David VI of Georgia
- Eudokia Palaiologina, who married Emperor John II of Trebizond
- Theodore Palaiologos (c. 1263 – after 1310)

== See also ==
- Family tree of Byzantine emperors

== Sources ==
- Geanakoplos, Deno John (1959). Emperor Michael Palaeologus and the West, 1258–1282: A Study in Byzantine-Latin Relations. Cambridge, Massachusetts: Harvard University Press.
- Nicol, Donald M. (1993) [1972]. The Last Centuries of Byzantium, 1261–1453 (Second ed.). Cambridge: Cambridge University Press. ISBN 978-0-521-43991-6.
- Talbot, Alice-Mary (1992). "Empress Theodora Palaiologina, Wife of Michael VIII". Dumbarton Oaks Papers. 46: 295–303. doi:10.2307/1291662. JSTOR 1291662.
- Trapp, Erich; Beyer, Hans-Veit; Walther, Rainer; Sturm-Schnabl, Katja; Kislinger, Ewald; Leontiadis, Ioannis; Kaplaneres, Sokrates (1976–1996). Prosopographisches Lexikon der Palaiologenzeit (in German). Vienna: Verlag der Österreichischen Akademie der Wissenschaften. ISBN 3-7001-3003-1.

Theodora Palaiologina (Byzantine empress) Doukas Vatatzes Born: c. 1240 Died: 4 March 1303
Royal titles
Preceded by Elena of Bulgaria	Byzantine Empress consort 1259–1282 with Anna of Hungary (1273–1281)	Succeeded by Irene of Montferrat
