= Anna of Hungary (Byzantine empress) =

Byzantine Empress consort
- Tenure: 1273–1281
- Born: c. 1260
- Died: 1281
- Spouse: Andronikos II Palaiologos
- Issue: Michael IX Palaiologos; Constantine Palaiologos
- House: Árpád
- Father: Stephen V of Hungary
- Mother: Elizabeth the Cuman
- Religion: Eastern Orthodox, prev. Roman Catholic

Anna of Hungary (c. 1260–1281) was a Princess of Hungary and Croatia, and a Byzantine Empress by marriage to Andronikos II Palaiologos.

She was the daughter of Stephen V of Hungary and Elizabeth the Cuman. Anna was granddaughter of Béla IV of Hungary.

On 8 November 1273, Anna married Andronikos II Palaiologos.

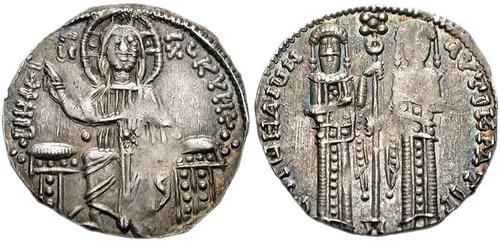
Coin of 1304–20 depicting Jesus on one side, and on the other, Anna's widower Andronikos II and her son Michael IX.

According to George Pachymeres, the couple had two children:

- Michael IX Palaiologos
- Constantine Palaiologos, despotes.

Anna died before her husband became senior emperor in 1282. However every Palaiologos emperor to the Fall of Constantinople in 1453 descended from her through her son Michael. Anna's sister Elisabeth and Simonida (a daughter of Anna's husband by his second wife) both married King Stefan Milutin of Serbia.

== Ancestry ==
Ancestors of Anna of Hungary

16. Béla III of Hungary
8. Andrew II of Hungary
17. Agnes of Antioch
4. Béla IV of Hungary
18. Berthold IV, Duke of Merania
9. Gertrude of Merania
19. Agnes of Rochlitz
2. Stephen V of Hungary
20. Manuel Laskaris
10. Theodore I Laskaris
21. Ioanna Karatzaina
5. Maria Laskarina
22. Alexios III Angelos
11. Anna Angelina
23. Euphrosyne Doukaina Kamatera
1. Anna of Hungary
12. Suthoi, Khan of Cumania
6. Köten
3. Elizabeth the Cuman

== Sources ==
- Giannouli, Antonia (2013). "Coronation Speeches in the Palaiologan Period". In Beihammer, Alexander; Constantinou, Stavroula; Parani, Maria (eds.). Court Ceremonies and Rituals of Power in Byzantium and the Medieval Mediterranean. Brill.
- Previte-Orton, C.W. (1962). The Shorter Cambridge Medieval History. Vol. II. Cambridge at the University Press.

Anna of Hungary (Byzantine empress) Árpád dynasty Born: c. 1260 Died: 1281
Royal titles
Preceded by Theodora Palaiologina	Byzantine Empress; 1273–1281 with Theodora Palaiologina (1273–1281)	Succeeded by Theodora Palaiologina
