= Neokastra =

Theme of the Byzantine Empire

Neokastra (Greek: Νεόκαστρα, "new fortresses", formally θέμα Νεοκάστρων; in Latin sources Neocastri or Neochastron) was a Byzantine province (theme) of the 12th–13th centuries in north-western Asia Minor (modern Turkey).

Its origin and extent are obscure. According to Niketas Choniates, the theme was founded by Manuel I Komnenos (r. 1143–1180) between 1162 and 1173. Manuel I scoured the region around three cities—Chliara (mod. Kırkağaç), Pergamon and Adramyttion—from the Turkish bands that raided it, rebuilt and refortified the cities and established forts in the countryside, and made them into a separate province called "Neokastra" (New Fortresses), due to the newly rebuilt settlements; it was under a governor titled harmostes ("supervisor") by the archaizing Choniates, but whose actual title in all probability must have been doux. The imperial chrysobull of 1198 to the Venetians on the other hand mentions Adramyttion apart from the Neokastra, and the Partitio Romaniae of 1204 mentions the province of Neokastra as being entirely separate from all three cities. The Byzantinist Helene Ahrweiler interpreted the evidence to suggest that Neokastra did indeed originally encompass the three cities, but that in 1198 Adramyttion may have formed a separate district, and that the separation between the cities and the province evidenced in the Partitio was the result of a copyist's error.

The theme survived the destruction of the Byzantine Empire by the Fourth Crusade, and was retained by the Empire of Nicaea, where it constituted, along with the Thracesian Theme to the south, the most important provinces. The boundaries of the Nicaean province were different, however: Adramyttion was lost to the new Latin Empire, and Pergamon was abandoned and fell in ruins. The account of George Akropolites, reflecting the new situation, mentions Neokastra apart from Chliara and Pergamon, and records the village of Kalamos (mod. Gelenbe) as the northernmost point of the theme, at the Nicaean frontier zone with the Latins. On the basis of Akropolites' passage, the scholar Ruth Macrides suggested an alternative reading of Choniates' passage, which would place the original theme of Neokastra immediately to the east of the three cities. Ahrweiler also suggested that the Nicaean-era province of Neokastra extended as far south as Magnesia or Sardis, but this is conjectural. A handful of governors of the theme are known: Manuel Kalampakes ca. 1284, a certain Libadarios, who was involved in the revolt of Alexios Philanthropenos in 1296, and the parakoimomenos Constantine Doukas Nestongos, active in 1303/4, whom Ahrweiler identifies as the theme's last known doux. The region fell shortly thereafter to the Anatolian beyliks of Karasi and Sarukhan.

== Sources ==
- Ahrweiler, Hélène (1965), "L'Histoire et la Géographie de la région de Smyrne entre les deux occupations turques (1081–1317)", Travaux et mémoires 1 (in French), Paris: Centre de recherche d'histoire et civilisation de Byzance, pp. 1–204
- Kazhdan, Alexander (1991). "Neokastra". In Kazhdan, Alexander (ed.). The Oxford Dictionary of Byzantium. Oxford and New York: Oxford University Press. p. 1428. ISBN 0-19-504652-8.
- Macrides, Ruth (2007), George Akropolites: The History – Introduction, translation and commentary, Oxford University Press, ISBN 978-0-19-921067-1
- Zakythinos, Dion A. (1948). "Μελέται περί της διοικητικής διαιρέσεως και της επαρχιακής διοικήσεως εν τω Βυζαντινώ κράτει" [Studies on administrative division and provincial administration in the Byzantine state]. Επετηρίς Εταιρείας Βυζαντινών Σπουδών (Society for Byzantine studies) (in Greek).
