= Konstantinos Amantos =

Greek writer and academic

Konstantinos Amantos (Greek: Κωνσταντίνος Άμαντος; 2 August 1874 – 23 January 1960) was a Greek Byzantinist and university professor.

== Life ==
Konstantinos Amantos was born on 2 August 1874 on Chios, then part of the Ottoman Empire. After completing school in Chios, he was appointed as a teacher at the island's "Civic School" (Ἀστικῆ Σχολῆ) in 1893. He remained at this post until 1897, when, through a scholarship granted from the bequest of the Chiot benefactor Stamatis Proïos, he was able to continue his studies. He studied first at the National University of Athens, and in 1899 moved to the Ludwig-Maximilians-Universität München, where he studied under the famous Byzantinist Karl Krumbacher. Amantos received his doctorate in 1903, with a treatise on the suffixes of modern Greek toponyms.

On his return to the Ottoman Empire, Amantos worked from 1904 to 1911 as professor at the Gymnasium of Chios, then as director of the Gymnasium of Nicosia (1911), and from 1912 to 1914 as director of the Ampeteios School at Cairo. In 1914, he was selected as an editor for the Historical Dictionary of the Greek Language (Ἰστορικὸν Λεξικὸν τῆς Ἑλληνικῆς Γλώσσης), a position he held until 1924, when he became director of the project. In 1925, he was elected to the chair of Byzantine history at the University of Athens, and held the post until his retirement in 1939. In 1926 he became a founding member of the Academy of Athens. In 1945 he served as Minister of Education in the short-lived cabinet of Nikolaos Plastiras (4 January – 8 April).

== Work ==
Amantos published several studies on linguistic issues, particularly of the dialect of his native Chios, as well as the historical geography of the Greek world. He was also active as the editor of the journals Chian Chronicles (Χιακά Χρονικά) and Aegean (Αἰγαῖον), which focused on Chios, as well as the journal Hellenica (Ἑλληνικά), which he published in 1928–1939 along with Dionysios Zakythinos and Sokratis Kougeas.

His studies on Byzantine history began with a school book, the Greek History from the Foundation of Constantinople to its Capture by the Ottomans (Ἑλληνική Ἱστορία ἀπό τῆς κτίσεως τῆς Κωνσταντινουπόλεως μέχρι τῆς ὑπὸ τῶν Ὀθωμανῶν ἀλώσεως αὐτῆς, 1910, 2nd edition 1914). His chief works on the subject were the Introduction to Byzantine History (Εἰσαγωγή εἰς τῆν Βυζαντινήν Ἱστορίαν, 1933, 2nd edition in 1950), and the History of the Byzantine State (Ἱστορία τοῦ Βυζαντινοῦ Κράτους), whose first volume was published in 1939 and the second in 1947 (2nd edition in 1953 and 1957 respectively). This work covered the history of Byzantium from the division of the Roman Empire in 395 until the fall of Constantinople to the Fourth Crusade in 1204.

Amantos also published important studies on the Greeks of Asia Minor in the Middle Ages (Ὁ Ἑλληνισμός τῆς Μικράς Ἀσίας κατὰ τον μεσαίωνα, 1919), the South Slavs, Bulgarians, and Albanians (Οἱ βόρειοι γείτονες τῆς Ἑλλάδος (Βούλγαροι - Ἀλβανοί - Νοτιοσλάβοι), 1923), and a number of articles focusing particularly on the history of Slavs in Greece and the relations of the Greeks with the Serbs, Bulgarians, and Turks. He extended his attention to the Ottoman era as well, with studies on Rigas Feraios, the Phanariote official Alexandros Mavrokordatos, the Chiot Renaissance scholar Leo Allatius, and Adamantios Korais. Other works include the Brief History of Cyprus in 1956, a number of studies on the Monastery of Saint Catherine on Mount Sinai, and studies dedicated to his native Chios, particularly during the Ottoman era.

== Sources ==
- Zakythinos, Dionysios A. (1959). "Νεκρολογίαι: Κωνσταντῖνος Ἂμαντος". Επετηρίς Εταιρείας Βυζαντινών Σπουδών (in Greek). XXIΧ: 449–455. hdl:11615/15233.

Political offices
| Preceded by Panos Hatzipanos | Minister of National Education of Greece; 4 January – 8 April 1945 | Succeeded by Dimitrios Balanos |
