= Andronikos II Palaiologos =

Byzantine emperor from 1282 to 1328

- Emperor and Autocrat of the Romans
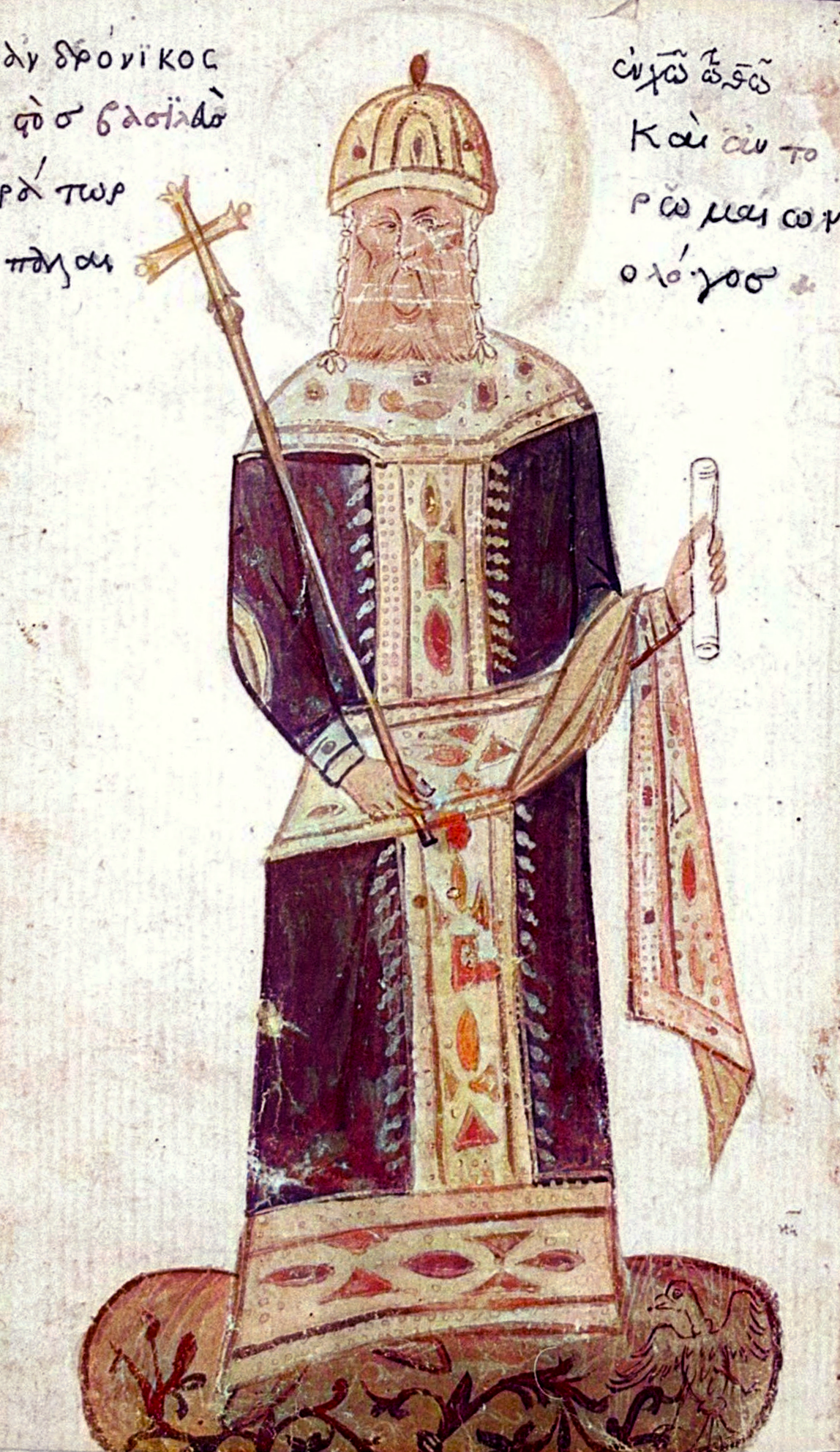
- Miniature from the manuscript of George Pachymeres' Historia

Byzantine emperor
- Reign: 11 December 1282 – 24 May 1328
- Coronation: 8 November 1272
- Predecessor: Michael VIII Palaiologos (alone)
- Successor: Andronikos III Palaiologos
- Co-emperor: Michael IX Palaiologos
- Proclamation: c. 1265 (as co-emperor)
- Born: 25 March 1259; Nicaea, Empire of Nicaea (now İznik, Bursa, Turkey)
- Died: 13 February 1332 (aged 72); Constantinople, Byzantine Empire (now Istanbul, Turkey)
- Spouses: Anna of Hungary; Yolande of Montferrat
- Issue more...: Michael IX Palaiologos; Constantine Palaiologos; John Palaiologos; Theodore I, Marquis of Montferrat; Demetrios Palaiologos; Simonis (Simonida Nemanjić), Queen of Serbia; Irene Palaiologina (wife of John II Doukas), Sebastokratorissa of Thessaly
Names
- Andronikos Doukas Angelos Palaiologos; Byzantine Greek: Ἀνδρόνικος Δούκας Ἄγγελος Κομνηνὸς Παλαιολόγος
- Dynasty: Palaiologos
- Father: Michael VIII Palaiologos
- Mother: Theodora Palaiologina
- Religion: Greek Orthodox

Andronikos II Palaiologos (Byzantine Greek: Ἀνδρόνικος Δούκας Ἄγγελος Κομνηνὸς Παλαιολόγος, romanized: Andrónikos Doúkās Ángelos Komnēnós Palaiológos; 25 March 1259 – 13 February 1332), Latinized as Andronicus II Palaeologus, reigned as Byzantine emperor from 1282 to 1328. His reign marked the beginning of the recently restored empire's final decline. The Turks conquered most of Byzantium's remaining Anatolian territories, and Andronikos spent the last years of his reign fighting his own grandson in the First Palaiologan Civil War. The war ended in Andronikos' forced abdication in 1328, after which he retired to a monastery for the remainder of his life.

== Life ==
=== Early life ===
Andronikos was born on 25 March 1259, at Nicaea. He was the eldest surviving son of Michael VIII Palaiologos and Theodora Palaiologina, grandniece of John III Doukas Vatatzes.

Andronikos was acclaimed co-emperor sometime after his father Michael VIII recovered Constantinople from the Latin Empire in 1261, but he was not crowned until 8 November 1272. During their joint rule, he was compelled to support his father's unpopular Church union with the Papacy. Made sole emperor by Michael's death in 1282, Andronikos immediately repudiated the union, but was unable to resolve the related schism within the Orthodox clergy until 1310.

=== Military campaigns ===
In 1283, the first military action of Andronikos II's reign occurred, against the town of Demetrias in Thessaly. At the time, Thessaly was ruled by John Doukas, and this campaign was one of many Byzantine attempts to reclaim the region. The protovestiarios Michael Tarchaneiotes led a force to the town where they were met by the fleet under the command of Alexios Raoul and the megas stratopedarches John Synadenos. The siege was successful, but an epidemic spread which killed Michael Tarchaneiotes and much of the force. The remaining army had no choice but to abandon the town and withdraw from Thessaly.

Upon his accession to the throne, Andronikos II faced numerous challenges on every front. Financially, his father's policies were unsustainable, and in 1285 he was forced to dismantle the imperial fleet. This action increased the Empire's maritime dependence on the Genoa, which was obliged to aid the Empire in accordance with the Treaty of Nymphaeum. In an effort to improve the treasury's position, Andronikos II devalued the Byzantine hyperpyron, while the state treasury accumulated less than one seventh the revenue (in nominal coins) that it had previously. Seeking to increase revenue, Andronikos II raised taxes and reduced tax exemptions, exacerbating the economy's already precarious state.

In 1291, Charles II, son of Charles of Anjou, entered into an alliance with the Despot of Epirus Nikephoros I Komnenos Doukas. This alliance reawakened Byzantine fears which had been dormant since the Sicilian Vespers. A Byzantine army was dispatched to Epirus, and in 1292 besieged Ioannina. Simultaneously, a Genoese fleet accompanied by Byzantine soldiers approached the capital of the Despotate, Arta. The army at Ioannina retreated north at the approach of the prince of Achaia, Florent of Hainault. The fleet departed after some raiding in the area. Like the campaign in Thessaly, the war further stretched imperial resources with little to show for it.

As a result of its alliance with Genoa, the empire was drawn into a pointless war with Venice between 1296 and 1302. While the Genoese settled with the Venetians in 1299, Andronikos II continued the war in hopes of gaining something from it. By the end of the war in 1302, virtually nothing was changed except the loss of resources desperately needed on other fronts.

=== Asia Minor ===
Andronikos II Palaiologos sought to resolve some of the problems facing the Byzantine Empire through diplomacy. After the death of his first wife, Anne of Hungary, he married Yolanda (renamed Irene) of Montferrat, putting an end to the Montferrat claim to the Kingdom of Thessalonica.

Andronikos II also attempted to marry off his son and co-emperor Michael IX Palaiologos to the Latin Empress Catherine I of Courtenay, thus seeking to eliminate Western agitation for a restoration of the Latin Empire. Another marriage alliance attempted to resolve the potential conflict with Serbia in Macedonia, as Andronikos II married off his five-year-old daughter Simonis to King Stefan Milutin in 1298.

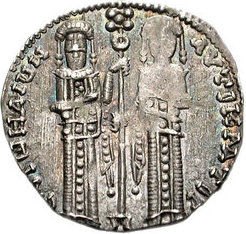
Silver basilikon depicting Andronikos II and Michael IX

In spite of the resolution of problems in Europe, Andronikos II was faced with the collapse of the Byzantine frontier in Asia Minor, despite the successful, but short, governorships of Alexios Philanthropenos and John Tarchaneiotes. The military victories of Philanthropenos and Tarchaneiotes against the Turks were largely dependent on a considerable contingent of Cretan escapees, or exiles from Venetian-occupied Crete, headed by Hortatzis, whom Michael VIII had repatriated to Byzantium through a treaty agreement with the Venetians ratified in 1277. Andronikos II had resettled those Cretans in the region of Meander river, the southeastern Asia Minor frontier of Byzantium with the Turks.

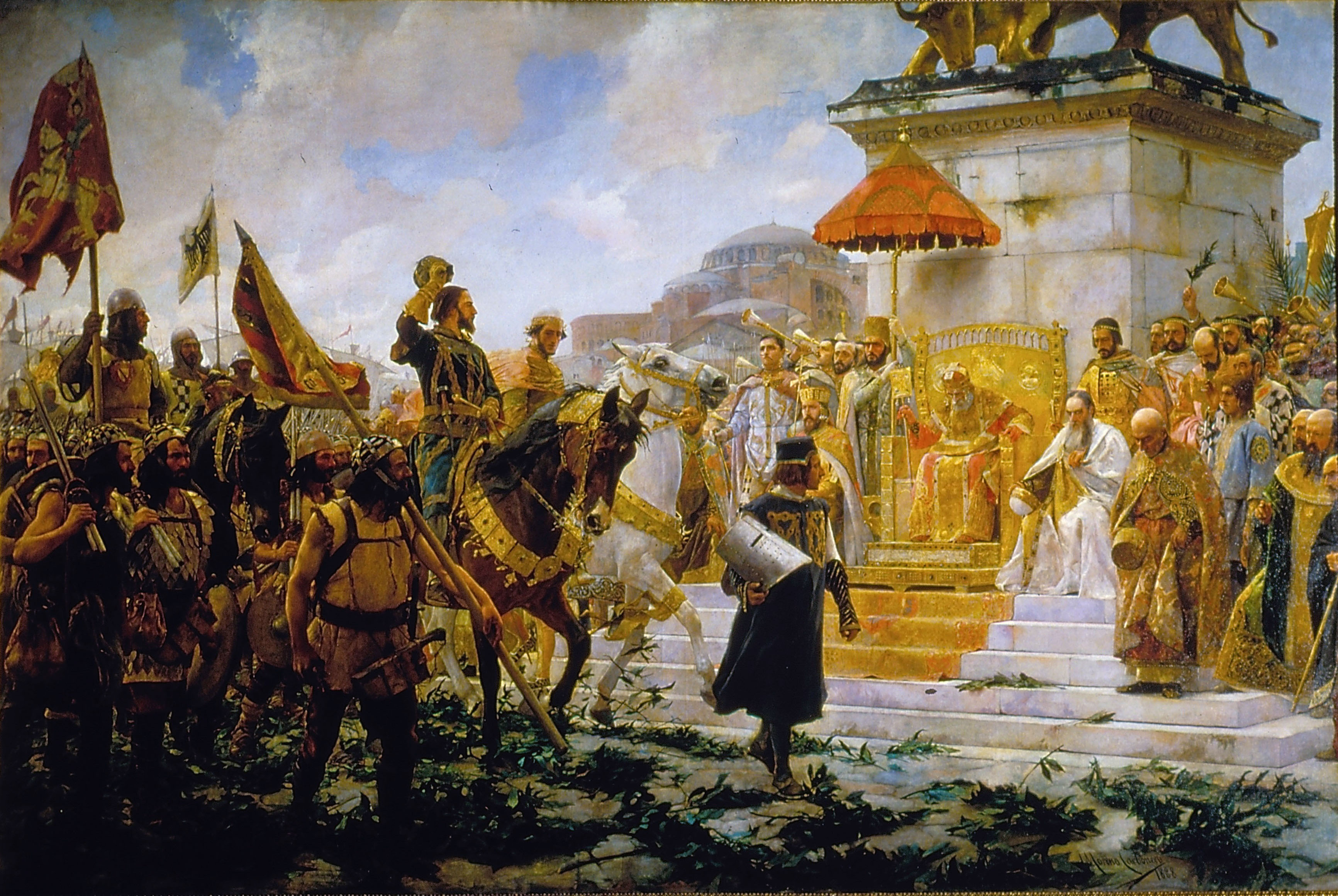
The Catalan Company led by Roger de Flor entering Constantinople by José Moreno Carbonero (1888).

After the failure of the co-emperor Michael IX to stem the Turkish advance in Asia Minor in 1302 and the disastrous Battle of Bapheus, the Byzantine government hired the Catalan Company of Almogavars (adventurers from Catalonia) led by Roger de Flor to clear Byzantine Asia Minor of the enemy. In spite of some successes, the Catalans were unable to secure lasting gains. Being more ruthless and savage than the enemy they intended to subdue, they quarrelled with Michael IX and eventually turned on their Byzantine employers after the murder of Roger de Flor in 1305. Together with a party of willing Turks they devastated Thrace, Macedonia, and Thessaly on their road to Latin occupied southern Greece. There they conquered the Duchy of Athens and Thebes. The Empire's problems were exploited by Theodore Svetoslav of Bulgaria, who defeated Michael IX and conquered much of northeastern Thrace in c. 1305–07. The conflict ended with yet another dynastic marriage, between Michael IX's daughter Theodora and the Bulgarian emperor.

Meanwhile, the Anatolian beyliks continued to penetrate Byzantine territory. Prusa fell to the Ottoman Turks in 1326, and by the end of Andronikos II's reign much of Bithynia was in the hands of Osman I and his son and heir Orhan. Karasids conquered Mysia-region with Paleokastron after 1296, Germiyan conquered Simav in 1328, Saruhan captured Magnesia in 1313, and Aydinids captured Smyrna in 1310.

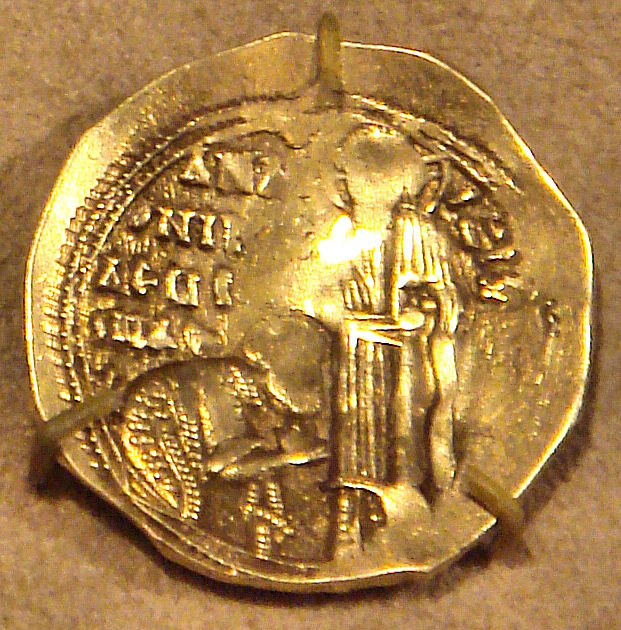
Gold hyperpyron of Andronikos II, kneeling before Christ

== Military policy ==
The military policy of Andronikos II was fundamentally shaped by the financial constraints of the empire he inherited from Michael VIII. The treasury was empty, and the grand designs of Michael were simply no longer achievable. Nonetheless, Andronikos attempted to continue his father's military policies to the best of his abilities.

=== Serbia ===
The Serbian frontier of the empire was said to have been embroiled in intermittent war for over a decade since 1282. Andronikos sent an army there in 1298, though its inability to fight a "guerrilla war" made the Emperor sign a peace with Serbia in the following year, sending his five-year-old daughter Simonis as a bride to Stefan Milutin.

=== Alexios Philanthropenos ===
The empire's Anatolian holdings, under attack since the 1260s, became the foremost concern of Andronikos; his attention would shift largely away from the west and towards the east. Andronikos frequently toured Anatolia to raise the population's morale and restored many fortresses there, yet this could not stem the massive flows of refugees coming into the empire's European holdings. In 1293, Alexios Philanthropenos was appointed to command and govern all armies in Anatolia, barring the Ionian coast. He was an effective general, scoring a series of victories in 1294 and 1295 against the Meander Valley Turks. It was said that so many prisoners were taken as to lower the price of a Turkish slave beneath even that of a sheep. Other Turks surrendered and formed a part of Philanthropenos's army. The victories of Alexios Philanthropenos, in comparison to the central government's otherwise ineffective handling of the Turkish threat combined with high taxation, meant that Alexios became regarded as the foremost leader, with particular loyalty stemming from his Cretan soldiers. The soldiers from Crete received a salary, but being "settled" in Anatolia probably also held land. It is not known, though, on what conditions they would have received this land. Reluctantly, amid massive popular support, Philanthropenos, in late 1295, accepted the challenge towards Andronikos II. Frightened, Andronikos offered Philanthropenos to become Caesar, though Alexios acted too slowly, and soon his support waned. Libadarios, the Governor of Neokastra and a loyalist of Andronikos, bribed the Cretans to blind and capture Alexios. The Cretans would never be heard of again— though John VI mentions a mysterious village in Thrace said to have been settled by an "army from Crete" before he arrived on the political scene in 1320.

=== John Tarchaneiotes ===
Following Philanthropenos, John Tarchaneiotes, a first cousin of Andronikos and an Arsenite, was sent to Anatolia. John was a general, but he was meant not to achieve quick victories but reform the military and economy of the region. It is said that many soldiers had lost their Pronoia holdings, while others had increased theirs through bribery of their superiors and stopped serving as soldiers. John sought to end this corruption and would reassess property holdings around the Meander Valley—a process known as exisosis. John's reforms in Anatolia were marked by success, revitalizing the army and even constructing a small fleet. However, he faced opposition from the large landowners of Anatolia— the primary targets of his policies— as well as the Church, which condemned his support of the deposed Patriarch Arsenios. The enmity faced by Tarchaneiotes boiled over when a small number of Pronoia soldiers accused him of rebellion before the anti-Arsenite bishop of Philadelphia, Theoleptos. With these treason charges pending in around 1300, Tarchaneiotes fled to Thessaloniki and joined Andronikos II there. Tarchaneiotes's reforms would be swiftly abandoned under the combined pressure of high clerical and landowner opposition.

=== The Alans ===
In late 1301, a group of Alans (a Christian Iranic people) crossed the empire's northern frontier. The Alans, last having fought for the empire in the late 11th century, were fleeing from the Mongol hordes and sought employment in the imperial army. Andronikos seized on this opportunity and hired them as supplemental mercenaries for two planned campaigns into Anatolia. In the spring of 1302, they were supplied with money, provisions, and horses, and divided into three groups: one led by the Megas Hetaireiarches Theodore Mouzalon to fight the Turks near Nicomedia, another under Michael IX to march south to Magnesia, and the third, composed of the wives and children of the warriors, to remain in Thrace. Much of Mouzalon's group deserted almost as soon as it crossed into Anatolia, indiscriminately plundering Byzantine holdings. By July 1302, Mouzalon was left with only 2,000 soldiers, perhaps half of which were Alans. Soon, a 5,000-strong army of light cavalry appeared between Nicaea and Nikomedia. These were led by Osman, the Turkish emir of Bithynia and founder of the Ottoman Empire. This force defeated Mouzalon on the plains near Mount Bapheus, then ravaged the empire's northwestern Anatolian holdings, accelerating the already severe refugee crisis. In April 1302, Michael IX departed for Anatolia with a mixed army of Alans and other troops. His army remained intact until it reached Magnesia on the Hermos. But once there, without fighting a battle, the native Byzantine divisions began to desert and the Alans likewise requested permission to abandon the campaign. Michael convinced them to stay another three months and sent a request to Constantinople for more funds. After the three months, the Alans refused to stay any longer and departed for Thracian Kallipolis. Michael was left in a dangerous position and fled in secrecy to Pergamon. Once this came out, his army and many of Magnesia's inhabitants followed suit in a scramble for safety. The Alans were eventually convinced to return their horses and weapons to Andronikos and left the empire.

=== Desperation ===
In 1303, the situation in Anatolia worsened to a point that Andronikos considered the most drastic of reforms: confiscating all the lands from churches, monasteries, single monks and the imperial entourage, and assigning it to soldiers. This would have created more soldiers with more reasons not to desert. Although there was no notable opposition to this plan, the decrepit imperial administration in Anatolia and the ever-worsening population flight prevented it from ever being realized. The remaining Anatolian population felt abandoned by Constantinople and occasionally individuals took matters into their own hands. In 1303, amidst the flight of the soldiers, an officer named Kotertzes established an emergency defense and drew to him a following who were “as enemies of his enemies and friends of his friends”. Andronikos was incapable of aiding or stopping Kotertzes or a certain Attaleiates who with popular support seized Magnesia in 1304. Another curiosity was a certain John Choiroboskos, known as “Pigherd”, who gathered 300 peasants in Thrace wanting to campaign against the Turks in Anatolia. Fearing that this would lead to a general insurrection, the central government imprisoned him. Choiroboskos escaped nine months later and rejoined the Anatolian refugees fighting the Turks. He was eventually captured in battle, but escaped again and fled back to Thrace. Having evidently proven himself, he was then commissioned by Michael IX, who gave him 1,000 peasants to fight the Catalans and Turks who were now in the empire's European holdings. This motley troop achieved nothing but the plunder of the environs of Thessalonica.

== Fiscal policy ==
The economic destitution which plagued the reign of Andronikos II caused him to undertake drastic measures to cut state spending. These cuts included the native army, which was reduced to a near-token force and largely superseded, first by foreign mercenary companies and then by militias. As shown by the failed campaign of Andronikos's co-emperor Michael IX, these inexperienced militiamen made countering the Turkish advance a difficult and dangerous undertaking.

For a time the Byzantine navy was completely disbanded, leaving the empire reliant on Genoese and Venetian forces who charged exorbitantly for their service. Many discharged Byzantine sailors and shipbuilders found employment with the Turkomans, who had just reached the western Anatolian coast and sought to build up their own naval forces. The resulting new fleets contributed greatly to the exploding problem of Turkic piracy in the Aegean Sea, ravaging trade routes and coastal lands alike.

In 1320, as a result of heightened taxation and more rigorous policies of collection, Andronikos II was able to raise a total of 1 million Hyperpyra for the budgetary year of 1321. He intended to use the money to expand his army to some 3000 horsemen, and to recreate the Byzantine Navy by building 20 ships. This plan, militarily ambitious though still insufficient for the needs of the empire, was disrupted by Andronikos II's impending civil war with his grandson Andronikos III.

For the sake of comparison, the Hyperpyron from 1320 was worth half as much as the undebased Nomisma from the reign of Basil II.

Estimate of State Budget for 1321
Budgetary Item	Estimated total (millions of hyperpyra)
Bodyguards 500 x 144hyp x 4/3	0.096M hyp.
Soldiers 3000 x 144hyp x 4/3	0.288M hyp.
Oarsmen 20ships x 5000hyp x 4/3	0.1M hyp.
Army supplies 3500 x 20hyp	0.07M hyp.
Navy supplies 3080 x 10hyp	0.031M hyp.
fodder & horses 3500 x 10hyp	0.035M hyp.
Catalan Campaign	0.05M hyp.
Civil Expenses	0.33M hyp.
Total	1.0M hyp.

== Early church policy ==
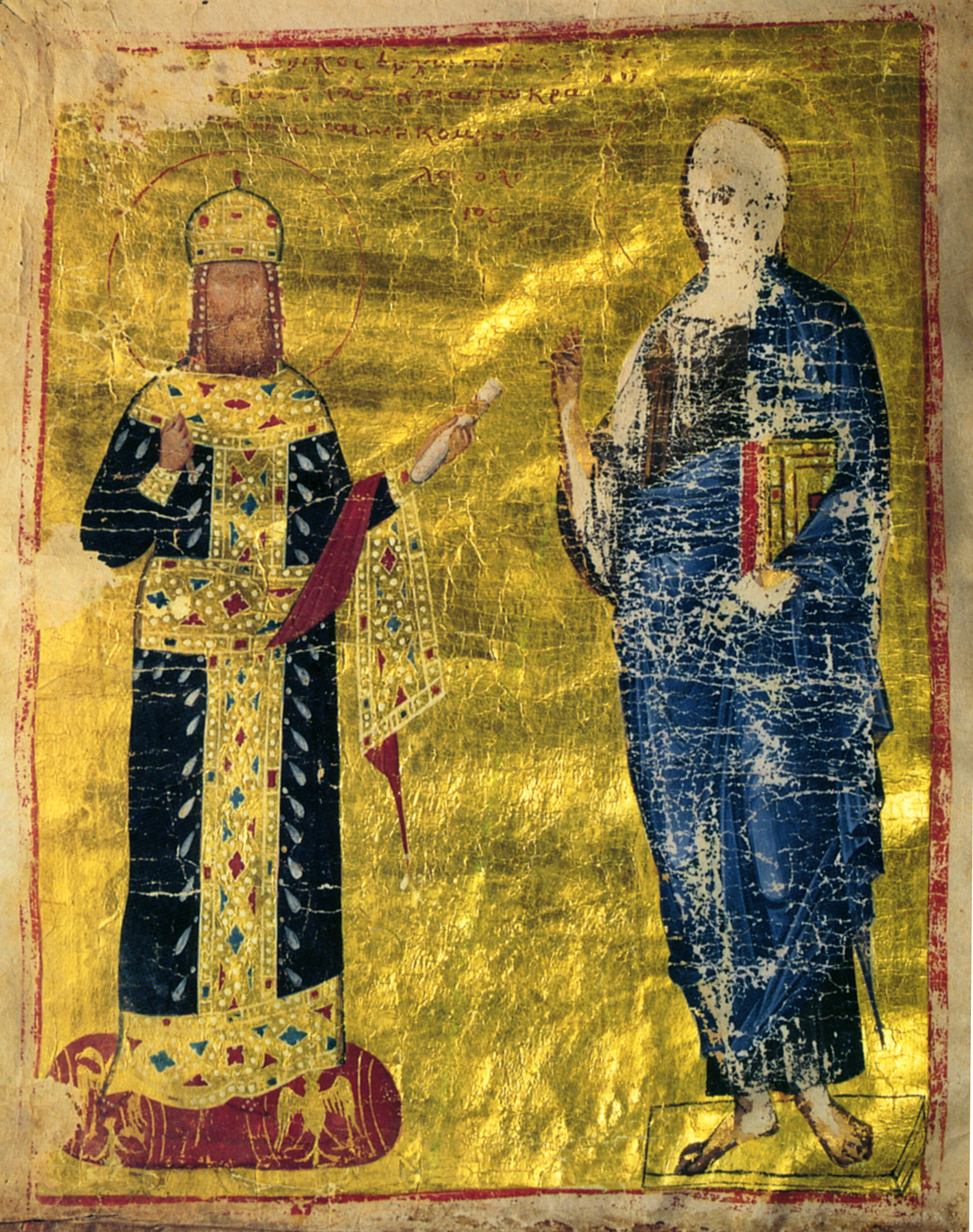
Chrysobull depicting Andronikos II alongside Christ, AD 1301.

As Andronikos broke the church union of his father he also removed many of his church appointments, including the pro-unionist Patriarch John XI. The new, anti-unionist Patriarch Joseph I resigned his office and died the following year, and was replaced by a Cypriot who took the name Gregory II.

Andronikos also faced the Arsenite schism, a movement which was anti-union but otherwise had little common ground with the emperor. Its name was derived from the former Patriarch Arsenios, who was removed from office after excommunicating Michael VIII for having blinded and imprisoned John IV. The Arsenites held that the captive John was the rightful Byzantine emperor and that the Patriarchs John XI, Joseph I, and now Gregory II were illegitimate.

To try and mend this schism, Gregory called for a church synod to which he invited both the Patriarchs of Alexandria and Antioch, asking them to rescind their previous pro-unionist declaration. The patriarch of Antioch refused, then abdicated from his office and fled to Syria. Gregory also extracted a public avowal from Empress Theodora that she would never ask that her deceased husband, Michael VIII, receive a Christian burial. Though this synod did much to satisfy the Orthodox clergy, it failed to do the same with the Arsenites.

A few years later Gregory II was forced to resign, as some of his writings were deemed to be heretical. His replacement, chosen by Andronikos in order to distract from an ever-worsening political situation, was an Athonite hermit who took the name Athanasius. The new Patriarch was intensely ascetic, and spent much of his time repudiating clergymen for their earthly possessions; eventually he sought to confiscate property from some of the wealthier churches and monasteries. Many clergymen responded with overt hostility, going as far as pelting him with stones as he walked the streets of Constantinople. Afterwards, Athanasius ceased to appear in public without a bodyguard.

When, in the summer of 1293, Andronikos returned from a visit to his swiftly-dwindling Anatolian holdings, he was met by a delegation of leading clergyman who demanded the deposition of Athanasius. Andronikos was unwilling, but the strength of the opposition eventually forced him to comply. Meanwhile, Athanasius personally penned a church bull in which he excommunicated the clergymen who had denounced him, hiding it in a pillar in the northern gallery of Hagia Sophia. It was only found a few years later, causing much uproar.

== Family ==
On 8 November 1273 Andronikos II married as his first wife Anna of Hungary, daughter of Stephen V of Hungary and Elizabeth the Cuman, with whom he had two sons:

- Michael IX Palaiologos (17 April 1277 – 12 October 1320).
- Constantine Palaiologos, despotes (c. 1278 – 1335). Constantine was forced to become a monk by his nephew Andronikos III Palaiologos.

Anna died in 1281, and in 1284 Andronikos married Yolanda (renamed Irene), a daughter of William VII of Montferrat, with whom he had:

- John Palaiologos (c. 1286–1308), despotēs.
- Bartholomaios Palaiologos (born 1289), died young.
- Theodore I, Marquis of Montferrat (1291–1338).
- Simonis Palaiologina (1294 – after 1336), who married King Stefan Milutin of Serbia.
- Theodora Palaiologina (born 1295), died young.
- Demetrios Palaiologos (1297–1343), despotēs.
- Isaakios Palaiologos (born 1299), died young.

Andronikos II also had at least three illegitimate daughters:

- Irene, who first married Ghazan, Khan of Persia, and later John II Doukas, ruler of Thessaly.
- Maria, who married Toqta, Khan of the Golden Horde.
- A daughter known as Despina Khatun, who married Öljaitü, Khan of the Ilkhanate.

== Deposition and death ==
The dissolute behaviour of Michael IX's son Andronikos III Palaiologos led to a rift in the family, and after Michael IX's death in 1320, Andronikos II disowned his grandson, prompting a civil war that raged, with interruptions, until 1328. The conflict precipitated Bulgarian involvement, and Michael Asen III of Bulgaria attempted to capture Andronikos II under the guise of sending him military support. In 1328 Andronikos III entered Constantinople in triumph and Andronikos II was forced to abdicate.

Andronikos II died as a monk at Constantinople in 1332, and was buried in the Lips Monastery (now the Fenari Isa Mosque). He is the only Emperor to have been found still in his tomb.

== Foundations ==
- Ardenica Monastery
- Panagia Olympiotissa Monastery
- Zograf monastery

== See also ==
- List of Byzantine emperors
- Rabban Bar Sauma

== Notes ==
Andronikos II Palaiologos Palaiologos dynasty Born: 25 March 1259 Died: 13 February 1332
Regnal titles
Preceded by Michael VIII	Byzantine emperor 1272–1328 with Michael VIII (1272–1282); Michael IX (1294–1320); Andronikos III (1325–1328)	Succeeded by Andronikos III
