= Third Siege of Philadelphia =

1322–1324 siege

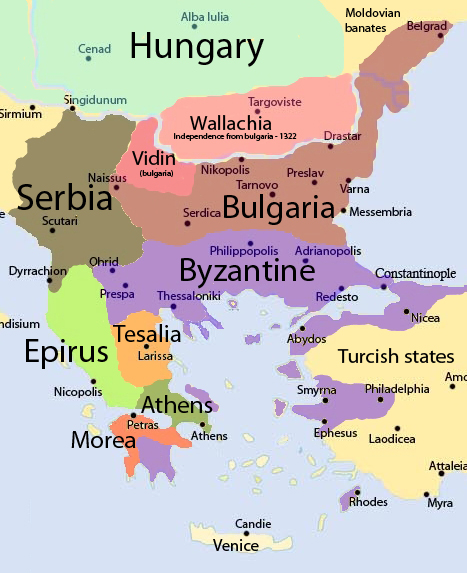
- The Byzantine Empire in 1307 (Philadelphia is depicted in the southeastern corner of the map)
Date	Late 1322 to early 1324
Location	Philadelphia, Asia Minor
Result	Negotiated settlement

Belligerents
Byzantine Empire	Anatolian beyliks; Germiyanids; Aydınids

Commanders and leaders
Manuel Tagaris; Alexios Philanthropenos	Yakub I Mehmed I

Units involved
Garrison of Philadelphia	Turkoman warriors

Strength
Unknown	Unknown

Casualties and losses
Unknown	Unknown

In early 1322, the Byzantine city of Philadelphia was subjected to a lengthy siege by the Germiyanids of Yakub I and the Aydinids of Mehmed I. The city was defended by Megas Stratopedarches Manuel Tagaris, until it was relieved through the intervention of the blind strategos Alexios Philanthropenos in late 1324.

== Background ==
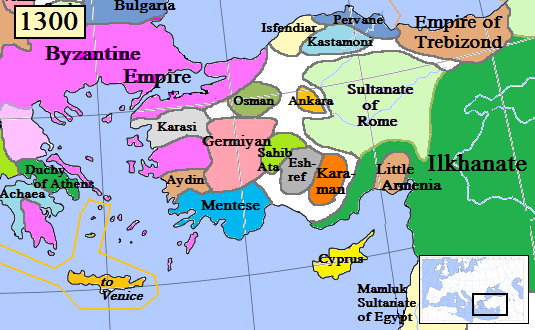
The Byzantine Empire and the beyliks c. 1300

In the late 13th and early 14th centuries, Turkoman nomads began raiding Byzantine territories in Asia Minor, destroying multiple settlements and pillaging wider countryside. Turkoman ghazis violently established themselves as regional warlords, forming their own independent beyliks on previously imperial land.

The Emperor Andronikos II appointed Alexios Philanthropenos in 1293 to command most of the remaining Anatolian army and put an end to the crisis. Philanthropenos scored multiple victories against the Turkomans, but eventually rebelled against the imperial authorities, and was thus blinded and imprisoned in 1295. After Philanthropenos, the emperor appointed John Tarchaneiotes, and after him he hired the Catalan Company, but due to a multitude of factors these only produced temporary successes.

As central authority in Asia Minor continued to fragment, the city of Philadelphia was first besieged by the Germiyanids and the Aydinids, under the command of Yakub I. It was successfully defended by Theoleptos, until the Catalans of Roger de Flor defeated the Turks in battle. In the winter of 1310/11, the Germiyanids and Aydinids besieged Philadelphia for a second time, but the city was successfully defended by Manuel Tagaris.

== Siege ==
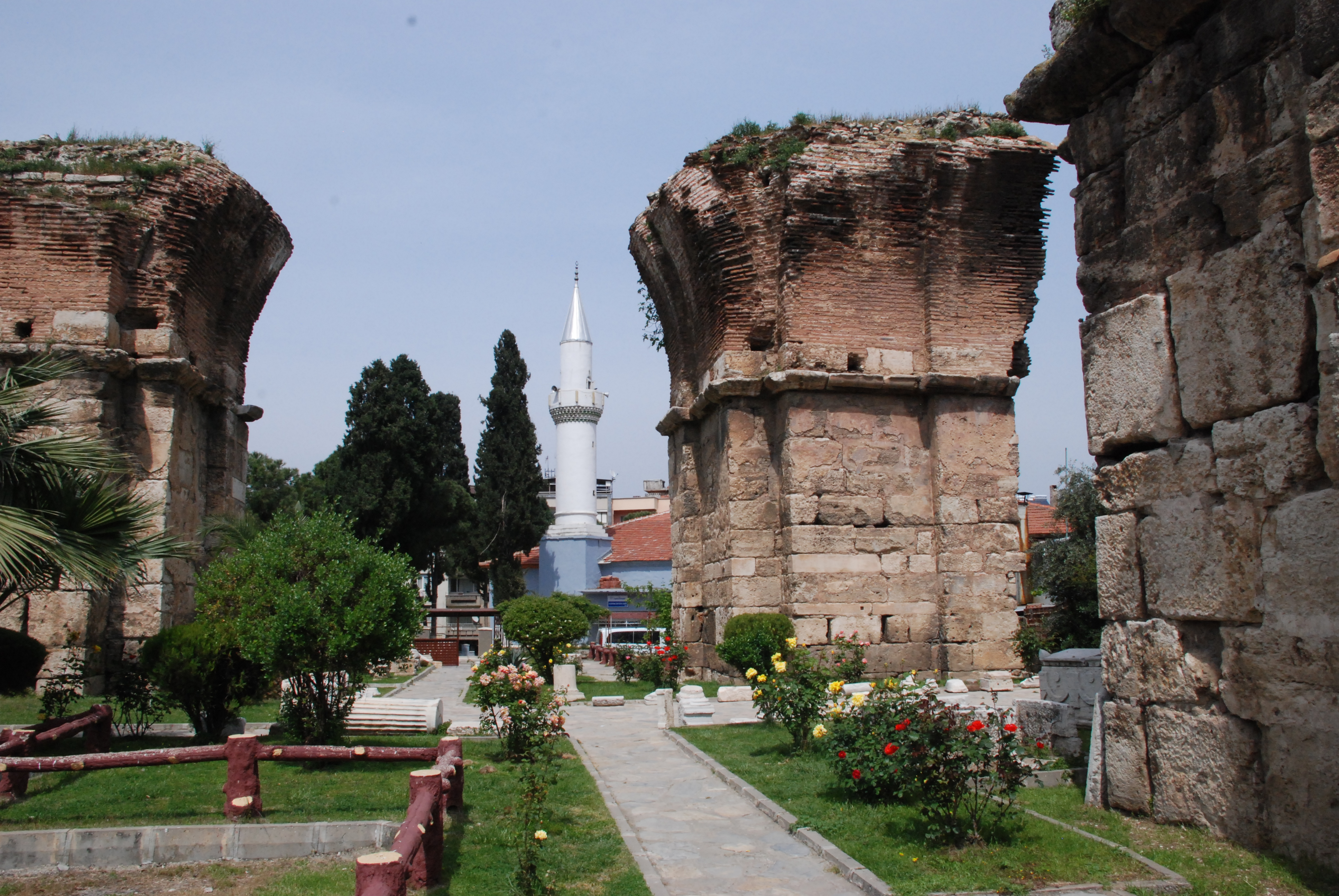
Ruins of the Basilica of Saint John of the Metropolis of Philadelphia

In late 1322, the Germiyanids of Yakub I and the Aydinids of Mehmed I invested the city of Philadelphia for a third time, besieging it with catapults, while also blockading the nearby fortress of Saint Nicholas. Throughout the duration of the siege, which lasted one year and seven months, Manuel Tagaris clashed with the protonotarios and student of Theoleptos, Manuel Gabalas. Gabalas accused Tagaris of corruption, misappropriation of city funds, seizure of grain, and exploitation of farmers. Due to the accusations, Tagaris expelled him from Philadelphia in December 1322. The situation grew worse when a famine broke out in the city, while many also feared the city would be betrayed to the Turks from within.

In 1324, after being convinced by Patriarch Isaias, and following a synodal decision, Andronikos II pardoned the blind Alexios Philanthropenos and tasked him with ending the besiegement of Philadelphia. Alexios, along with his son Michael Philanthropenos, headed torwards Sardis. According to Nikephoros Gregoras, Philanthropenos was sent "without an army, nor weapons, nor any abundance of money", but as researcher Rustam Shukurov notes, due to "his prestige among the Turks as an invincible enemy and a generous ally", Philanthropenos successfully negotiated a resolution with Mehmed I, in which the Turks withdrew, possibly in exchange for tribute to Yakub I. Philanthropenos also relieved the siege on the fortress of Saint Nicholas. According to Byzantinist Donald Nicol:

About 1324 Andronikos II in desperation had granted a pardon to Alexios Philanthropenos, the general who had been convicted of treason in Asia Minor nearly 30 years before, and sent him to relieve the Turkish blockade of the city of Philadelphia. Philanthropenos was blind and elderly; though he took an oath of loyalty the Emperor would not trust him with an army under his own command. But to the Turks in Lydia his name was still a legend, and the news of his return to the scene of his former triumphs is said to have sent them scattering from Philadelphia.

The inhabitants of Philadelphia welcomed Philanthropenos into the city. There, he became the city's governor until 1327.

== Aftermath ==
=== Political controversy ===
After the siege ended, Tagaris was condemned by Gabalas for devastating wheat fields, assaulting the Byzantine army, and even taking control of several towns in Asia Minor, intending to divide them with the Turks, with whom he had allegedly formed secret alliances with. He was also accused of marrying his own daughter to the emir of Sarukhan. The citizens of Philadelphia almost had him killed, until he returned to them the grain he had seized during the siege. Tagaris fled from the city at night, possibly attempting to flee to Sarukhan, but he was intercepted by the residents of Philadelphia, and was forced to take refuge in Constantinople, where he was found guilty by a synod, but was absolved by Andronikos II.

=== Developments in Philadelphia ===
Anachronistic map of Anatolia c. 1330 (Philadelphia is not visible on the map)

In 1327, the Mongol viceroy of Anatolia Timurtash arrived in the city, supporting the independence of Philadelphia against the Germiyanids and Aydinids, as at that point the Mongols were allied to the Byzantines. However, after the Ilkhanids collapsed, the Aydinids under their new leader Umur would besiege Philadelphia for a fourth time in 1335.

== Bibliography ==
- Bartusis, Mark C. (1997). The Late Byzantine Army: Arms and Society 1204–1453. University of Pennsylvania Press. ISBN 0-8122-1620-2.
- Foss, Clive (2022). The Beginnings of the Ottoman Empire. Oxford University Press. ISBN 978-0-19-886543-8.
- Juan López, Juan Bautista (2024). Manuel Gabalas: Biography, Intellectual Network, Works and Thought (PDF) (PhD thesis). Department of Medieval Studies of the Central European University Private University, Vienna.
- Nicol, Donald M. (1993) [1972]. The Last Centuries of Byzantium, 1261–1453 (Second ed.). Cambridge: Cambridge University Press. ISBN 978-0-521-43991-6.
- Schopen, Ludwig (1829). Nicephori Gregorae Byzantina Historia (in Latin and Greek). Vol. I. Bonnae.
- Shukurov, Rustam (2016). The Byzantine Turks, 1204-1461. BRILL. ISBN 9789004307759.
- Talbot, Alice-Mary (1991). "Theoleptos". In Kazhdan, Alexander (ed.). The Oxford Dictionary of Byzantium. Oxford University Press. pp. 2056–2057. ISBN 978-0-19-504652-6.
- Trapp, Erich (1991). "Tagaris". In Kazhdan, Alexander (ed.). The Oxford Dictionary of Byzantium. Oxford and New York: Oxford University Press. ISBN 0-19-504652-8.
- Trapp, Erich (2001). Prosopographisches Lexikon der Palaiologenzeit. Austrian Academy of Sciences. ISBN 978-3700130031.
- Vryonis, Speros (1971). The Decline of Medieval Hellenism in Asia Minor and the Process of Islamization from the Eleventh through the Fifteenth Century. University of California Press. ISBN 0-520-01597-5.
