= Second Siege of Philadelphia =

1310/11 siege

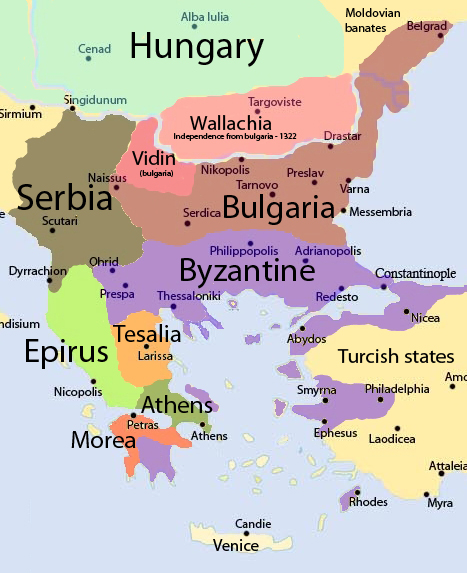
- The Byzantine Empire in 1307 (Philadelphia is depicted in the southeastern corner of the map)
Date	winter 1310/11–spring 1311
Location	Philadelphia, Asia Minor
Result	Negotiated settlement

Belligerents
Byzantine Empire	Anatolian beyliks; Germiyanids; Aydınids

Commanders and leaders
Manuel Tagaris; Theoleptos	Yakub I Mehmed I

Units involved
Garrison of Philadelphia	Turkoman warriors

Strength
Unknown	Unknown

Casualties and losses
Unknown	Unknown

In 1310/11, the Byzantine city of Philadelphia was subjected to a lengthy siege by the Germiyanids of Yakub I. The city was successfully defended by the Megas Stratopedarches Manuel Tagaris, and the Metropolitan Theoleptos, until a peace agreement was negotiated between the two sides.

== Background ==
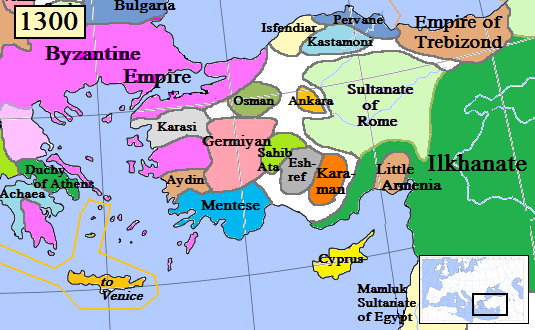
The Byzantine Empire and the beyliks c. 1300

In the late 13th and early 14th centuries, Turkoman nomads began raiding Byzantine territories in Asia Minor, pillaging villages, cities and the wider countryside. Independent ghazis violently established themselves as regional warlords, forming their own independent beyliks on previously imperial land. The Emperor Andronikos II attempted to mediate the crisis through the appointment of the strategoi Alexios Philanthropenos and John Tarchaneiotes, as well as through the hiring of the Catalan Company, although these endeavours only produced temporary successes.

During this period of uncertainty and territorial fragmentation in western Anatolia, Philadelphia was first besieged by the Germiyanids and the Aydinids under the command of Yakub I. It was successfully defended by Theoleptos, and was eventually relieved by the Catalans of Roger de Flor, who annihilated the Turkoman nomads at the Battle of Aulax in April 1304.

== Siege ==
Ruins of the Basilica of Saint John of Philadelphia

In the winter of 1310/11, the Germiyanids of Yakub I surrounded and invested Philadelphia for the second time. Theoleptos helped maintain morale, organized the distribution of food, and attempted to take control of the administration, and lead the defences. However, he became involved in a power struggle with the military governor of the city, Manuel Tagaris. Both men believed themselves to be in command, while Theoleptos also insisted that the soldiers should obey him, as he considered himself to be both a priest and a general.

During the siege, the metropolitan sent his protonotarios, Manuel Gabalas, to Constantinople, in order to request aid against the Germiyanids and to also rally support for the removal of Tagaris from his position. However, Gabalas was unsuccessful in both endeavours.

Eventually, as the Germiyanids could not breach the city walls, and as reinforcements from the capital were not coming, Theoleptos negotiated a peace deal with the nomads, probably agreeing to a tribute payment (used by the Germiyanids to build the Vacidiye madrasa in Kotyaion), in the spring of 1311.

== Aftermath ==
For his success in defending the city, Andronikos II appointed Tagaris to the rank of synkletikos, and even gave him the hand of his niece, Theodora Palaiologina Asanina, daughter of Tsar Ivan Asen III, as his second wife.

However, after the siege ended, theological and political disputes continued to erupt within Philadelphia. On 14 September 1310, Theoleptos refused communion with the Patriarchate of Constantinople, due to the reconciliation of the Church with the Arsenites, starting a six-year-long schism between Philadelphia and Constantinople that ended in 1317. Clashes between the clergy and the secular authorities of the city also persisted, as disputes between Theoleptos, Gabalas and Tagaris continued for more than a decade.

The Germiyanids and Aydinids would invest Philadelphia for a third time in late 1322, leading to the Third Siege of Philadelphia. The third siege would eventually be lifted by the blind strategos Alexios Philanthropenos in early 1324, after he was pardoned by the emperor.

== Bibliography ==
- Angelov, Dimiter (2007). Imperial Ideology and Political Thought in Byzantium (1204-1330). Cambridge University Press. ISBN 978-0-521-85703-1.
- Bartusis, Mark C. (1997). The Late Byzantine Army: Arms and Society 1204–1453. University of Pennsylvania Press. ISBN 0-8122-1620-2.
- Guilland, Rodolphe (1967). "Le Stratopédarque et le Grand statopédarque". Recherches sur les institutions byzantines, Tome I (in French). Berlin: Akademie-Verlag. pp. 498–521.
- Juan López, Juan Bautista (2024). Manuel Gabalas: Biography, Intellectual Network, Works and Thought (PDF) (PhD thesis). Department of Medieval Studies of the Central European University Private University, Vienna.
- The Chronicle of Muntaner. Vol. II. Translated by Goodenough, Lady Anna Kinsky. Hakluyt Society. 1921.
- Nicol, Donald M. (1993) [1972]. The Last Centuries of Byzantium, 1261–1453 (Second ed.). Cambridge: Cambridge University Press. ISBN 978-0-521-43991-6.
- Sinkewicz, Robert E., ed. (1992). Theoleptos of Philadelphia: The Monastic Discourses. Pontifical Institute of Medieval Studies. ISBN 0-88844-111-8.
- Talbot, Alice-Mary (1991). "Theoleptos". In Kazhdan, Alexander (ed.). The Oxford Dictionary of Byzantium. Oxford University Press. pp. 2056–2057. ISBN 978-0-19-504652-6.
- Trapp, Erich (1991). "Tagaris". In Kazhdan, Alexander (ed.). The Oxford Dictionary of Byzantium. Oxford and New York: Oxford University Press. ISBN 0-19-504652-8.
- Trapp, Erich (2001). Prosopographisches Lexikon der Palaiologenzeit. Austrian Academy of Sciences. ISBN 978-3700130031.
- Vryonis, Speros (1971). The Decline of Medieval Hellenism in Asia Minor and the Process of Islamization from the Eleventh through the Fifteenth Century. University of California Press. ISBN 0-520-01597-5.
