= First Siege of Philadelphia =

1304 siege

- Part of the Catalan campaign in Asia Minor
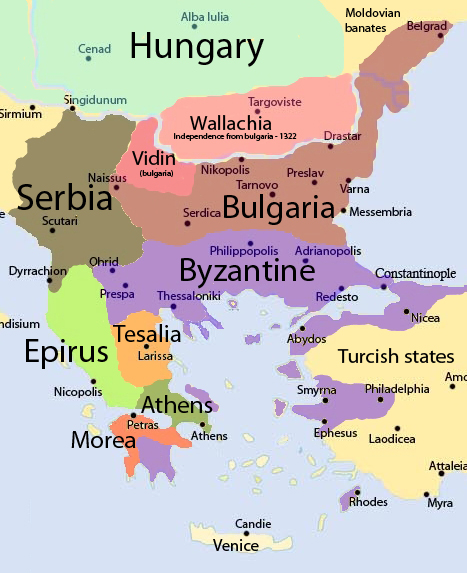
- The Byzantine Empire in 1307 (Philadelphia is depicted in the southeastern corner of the map)
Date	until April 1304
Location	Philadelphia, Asia Minor
Result	Byzantine victory

Belligerents
Byzantine Empire; Catalan Company	Anatolian beyliks; Germiyanids; Aydınids

Commanders and leaders
Theoleptos; Roger de Flor; Corberan d'Alet; Maroules	Yakub I Mehmed I

Units involved
Garrison of Philadelphia; Relief army; Catalan mercenaries; Byzantine soldiers	Turkoman warriors

Strength
Unknown number of garrison forces; 6,500 strong relief army; 1,000 infantry; 1,500 knights; 4,000 almogavars; Uknown number of Byzantines	20,000 Turkomans; 12,000 infantry; 8,000 light cavalry

Casualties and losses
180 killed; 100 infantry; 80 cavalry	18,500 killed or captured; 11,500 infantry; 7,000 cavalry

In 1304, the Byzantine city of Philadelphia was subjected to a lengthy siege by the Germiyanids of Yakub I and the Aydinids of Mehmed I. The city was successfully defended by its metropolitan bishop, Theoleptos, and was eventually relieved due to the intervention of the Catalan Company, under Roger de Flor, which defeated the besieging Turkoman forces in the Battle of Aulax.

== Background ==
=== Turkoman incursions ===
During the late 13th century, Turkoman tribes moved away from central Anatolia following their defeat by Mongol–Seljuk forces in 1261 and in 1262. They moved westwards and began raiding Byzantine settlements and the wider countryside. While the Byzantines were preoccupied with conflicts in Europe, the nomads penetrated into western Anatolia, plundering and conquering imperial territory. The crisis caused many of the locals to flee, and as a result the region became depopulated. Eventually, independent beyliks and emirates were formed by Turkoman ghazis, who violently began establishing themselves, leading to the further fragmentation of the region.

The Emperor Andronikos II Palaiologos attempted to mediate the crisis by travelling to, and inspecting the region, building fortifications, and attempting to raise morale, but without success. In 1293, he appointed the strategos Alexios Philanthropenos, who scored multiple victories against the Turkomans, but eventually rebelled against the imperial authorities, and was blinded and imprisoned. After Philanthropenos, Andronikos II appointed John Tarchaneiotes to stabilise the frontier in 1298. However, due to his military reforms, distribution of pronoia, and Arsenite beliefs, he became unpopular with the local provincial aristocracy and clergy, was falsely accused of planning a rebellion by Theoleptos, and was eventually forced to flee from Asia Minor.

=== The Catalan Company ===
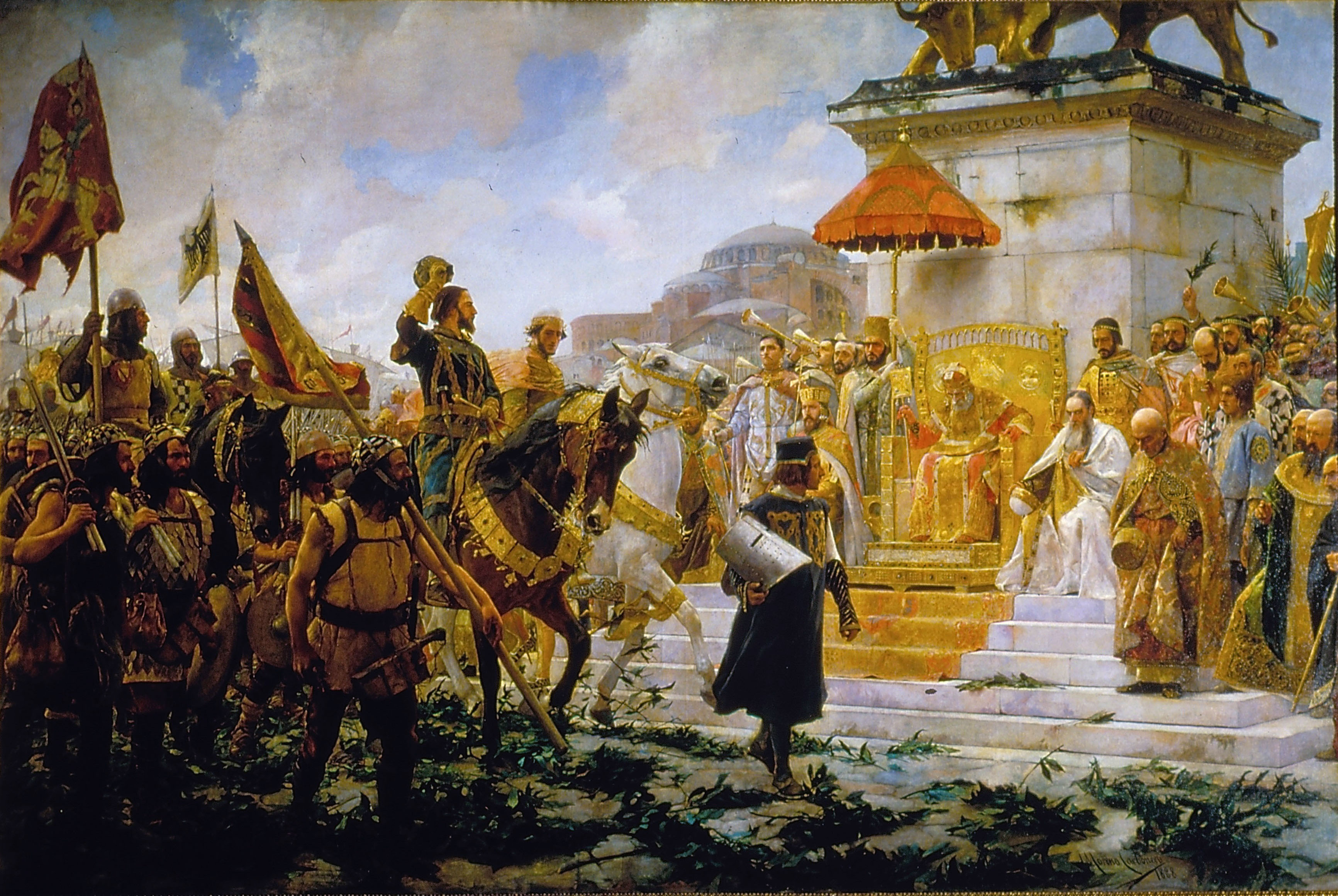
"The Entry of Roger de Flor into Constantinople", by José Moreno Carbonero in 1888

The Anatolian frontier continued to deteriorate, until the Byzantines were defeated by the rising Ottoman Beylik at Bapheus and Magnesia. As a result, in 1302, Andronikos II decided to hire the Catalan Company of Roger de Flor, in hopes of better combating the Turkoman invasions and stopping the crisis. In September 1303, 6,500 Catalans reached Constantinople by sea, and were subsequently reinforced with 500 Alan mercenaries. The combined army successfully reconquered the Aegean islands of Chios, Lesbos, and Lemnos, along with the Anatolian city Cyzicus in early 1304. However, in the process the Catalans plundered and inflicted violence upon the local inhabitants, got involved in murderous street battles with Genoese sailors, and heavily damaged the city of Cizycus, while their high salary also prompted the Alan mercenaries to defect from the empire and pillage Bithynia.

== Siege and battle of Aulax ==
=== Siege of Philadelphia ===
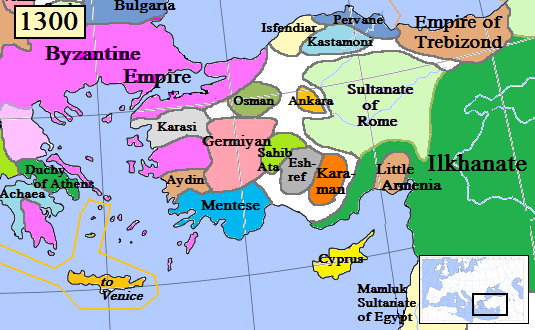
The Byzantine Empire and the beyliks c. 1300

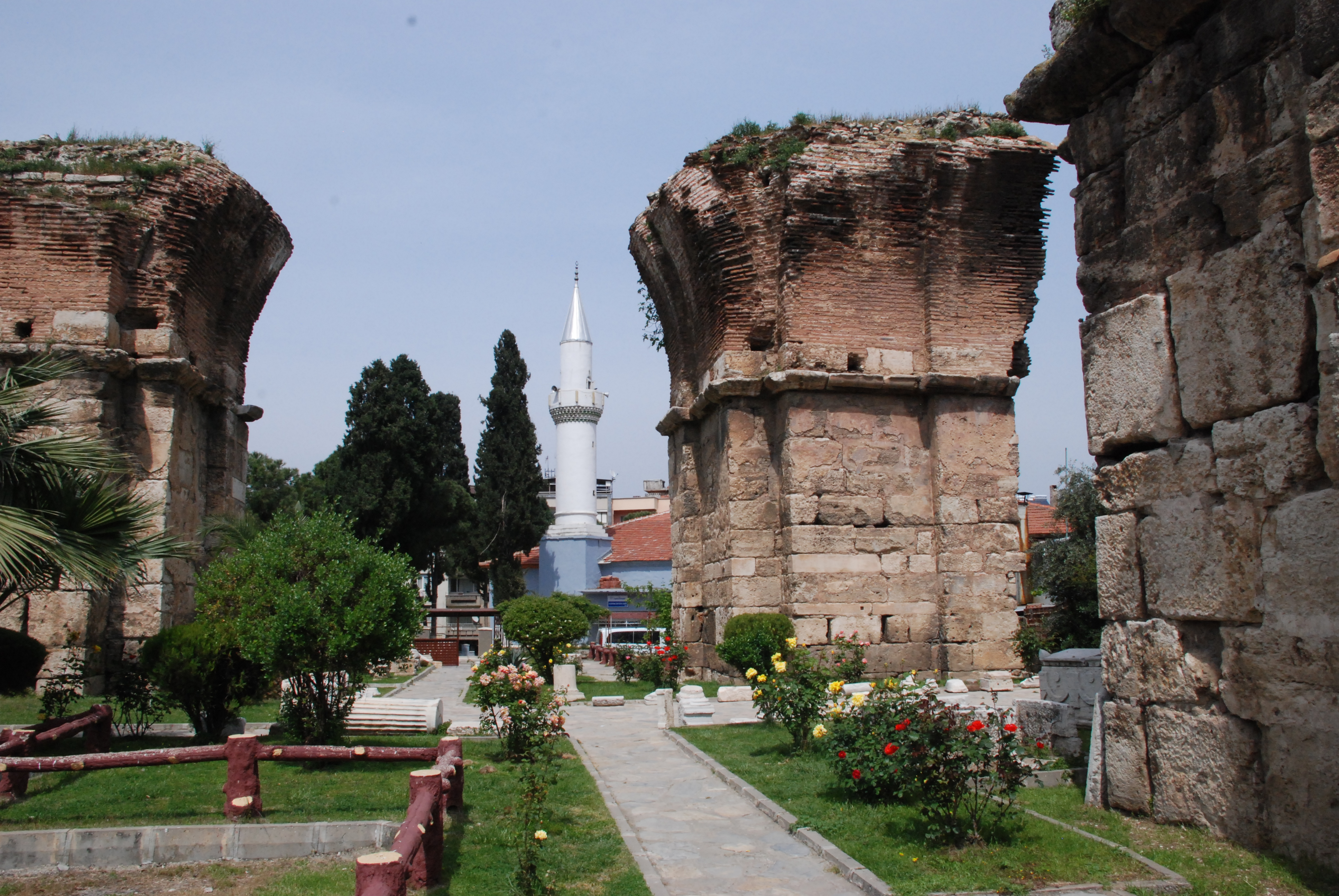
Ruins of the Basilica of Saint John of the Metropolis of Philadelphia

By the early 14th century, the city of Philadelpheia had become surrounded by Turkoman beyliks. In 1304, invading Germiyanid and Aydinid forces, led by Yakub I began investing the city. The historian George Pachymeres described the hardships endured by the residents of Philadelphia as their food supplies dwindled, while Nikephoros Choumnos emphasized the role played by his spiritual guide, Theoleptos, who likely led the defence of the city until the arrival of the Catalans.

=== Battle of Aulax ===
Roger de Flor and his mercenaries arrived in Philadelphia in April 1304. The Catalan Company confronted the Turkomans in the Battle of Aulax around June 1304. The Catalans defeated and routed the invading nomads, killing the vast majority of them. According to the Chronicle of Muntaner:

At once, before the arrows of the Turks hit their mark, the horsemen attacked the Turkish horsemen and the almugavars the men afoot. What shall I tell you? The battle was very hard and lasted from sunrise until the hour of nones. The Turks were all killed or taken prisoners.

After Philadelphia was relieved, the Catalans camped at, and searched the battlefield for a full eight days, before entering the city in triumph. They were warmly received by the Philadelphians and stayed in the city for 15 days. The Catalan chronicle of Francisco de Moncada describes that:

The people of Philadelpheia, freed by the valor of Catalan arms from the siege that had so distressed them, went out to meet the army. Their administrators and Theoleptus, their bishop, a man of rare sanctity, whose prayers had done more to defend the city than had the arms of the people who guarded it, headed their people.

== Aftermath ==
Despite the victory the Catalans achieved, they had no interest in continuing the campaign southeastwards. According to the Byzantinist Donald Nicol:

The relief of Philadelphia was almost the only practical service that the Catalans rendered to the Byzantine Empire in Asia Minor. Roger made no attempt to follow up his victory by marching south to the Meander valley. The town of Tripolis had just been taken by the Turks. The towns of Nyssa and Tralles were already in their control. But the Catalans left them to their fate.

Roger de Flor instead moved to Nymphaion, Magnesia, Thyrea, and then towards the coast of Ephesus, where he could make contact with his fleet. Soon after, the Catalans left the area with plans of turning Magnesia into the capital of a new Spanish principality in Anatolia. As a result of their withdrawal from the area, Ephesus soon fell to the Beylik of Menteshe, as Sasa Bay captured it on 24 October 1304. The city was sacked and the local population was either killed, or later deported to Thyrea.

Philadelphia would continue to be threatened by invading Turkomans in the following years. The Germiyanids under Yakub I would again attempt to besiege the city in 1310/11, but they were unsuccessful due to its successful defence by Manuel Tagaris and Theoleptos.

== Bibliography ==
- Bartusis, Mark C. (1997). The Late Byzantine Army: Arms and Society 1204–1453. University of Pennsylvania Press. ISBN 0-8122-1620-2.
- Foss, Clive (1979). Ephesus After Antiquity. Cambridge University Press.
- Juan López, Juan Bautista (2024). Manuel Gabalas: Biography, Intellectual Network, Works and Thought (PDF) (PhD thesis). Department of Medieval Studies of the Central European University Private University, Vienna.
- The Chronicle of Muntaner. Vol. II. Translated by Goodenough, Lady Anna Kinsky. Hakluyt Society. 1921.
- Nicol, Donald M. (1993) [1972]. The Last Centuries of Byzantium, 1261–1453 (Second ed.). Cambridge: Cambridge University Press. ISBN 978-0-521-43991-6.
- Ramsay, William (1890). The Historical Geography of Asia Minor. Royal Geographical Society.
- Sinkewicz, Robert E., ed. (1992). Theoleptos of Philadelphia: The Monastic Discourses. Pontifical Institute of Medieval Studies. ISBN 0-88844-111-8.
- Talbot, Alice-Mary (1991). "Theoleptos". In Kazhdan, Alexander (ed.). The Oxford Dictionary of Byzantium. Oxford University Press. pp. 2056–2057. ISBN 978-0-19-504652-6.
- Trapp, Erich (2001). Prosopographisches Lexikon der Palaiologenzeit. Austrian Academy of Sciences. ISBN 978-3700130031.
- Vryonis, Speros (1971). The Decline of Medieval Hellenism in Asia Minor and the Process of Islamization from the Eleventh through the Fifteenth Century. University of California Press. ISBN 0-520-01597-5.
