= George Tagaris =

14th century Byzantine general

- Γεώργιος Τάγαρις

Personal details
- Died: After 1357
- Children: Paul Palaiologos Tagaris (possibly)

Military service
- Allegiance: Byzantine Empire
- Rank: Megas Stratopedarches
- Battles/wars: Second Palaiologan Civil War

George Tagaris (Greek: Γεώργιος Τάγαρις, fl. c. 1346–1355) was a Byzantine general of the middle 14th century, who rose to the rank of megas stratopedarches.

== Biography ==
=== Family background ===
The Tagaris family is first attested in the early years of the 14th century. George's father, Manuel Tagaris, was the first of the family to rise to prominence, as due to his successful defence of Philadelphia in 1310/11, he was favoured by Emperor Andronikos II Palaiologos, who promoted him to megas stratopedarches and gave him his niece, the noble Theodora Palaiologina Asanina, as his second wife. It is unclear whether Theodora or Manuel's first wife (who was either a Monomachina or Doukaina) was George's mother.George may in turn have been a brother, father, or a relative of Paul Palaiologos Tagaris.

=== Career ===
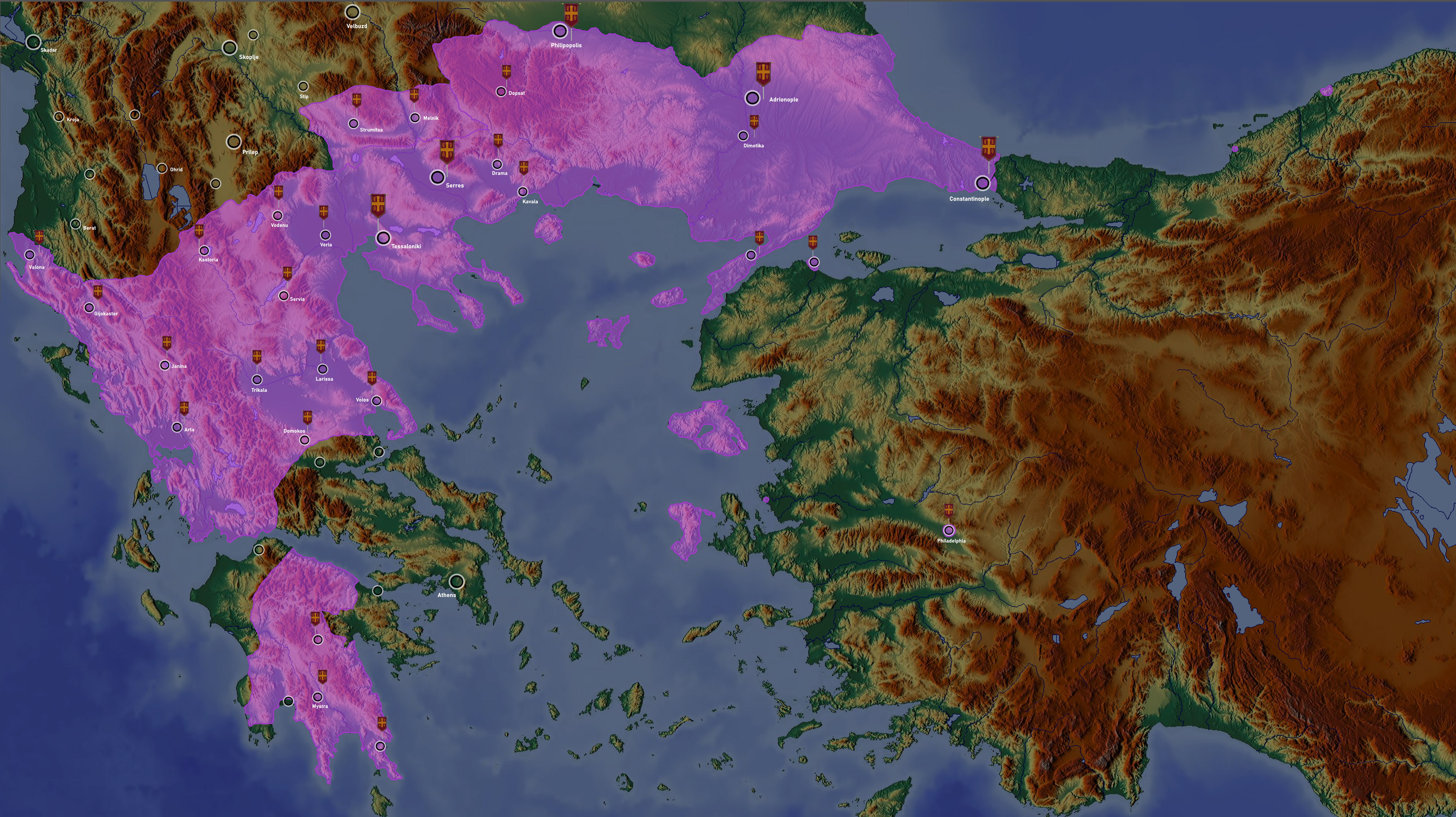
The Byzantine Empire in 1341

George Tagaris first appears in 1346, during the Second Palaiologan Civil War. At the time, he already held the rank of megas stratopedarches, like his father before him. He was entrusted by Empress Anna of Savoy with a mission to travel to the bey of Sarukhan and enlist his support for Anna during the war against John Kantakouzenos, who had alredy successfully concluded an alliance with Orhan, ruler of the rising Ottoman beylik. The ruler of Sarukhan, who had known George's father and was possibly even married to George's sister, gladly complied with the request.

George is next mentioned in 1356, when he was amongst the recipients of letters from Pope Innocent VI, who praised him for his support of a union between the Roman Catholic and the Eastern Orthodox churches.

== Bibliography ==
- Guilland, Rodolphe (1967). "Le Stratopédarque et le Grand statopédarque". Recherches sur les institutions byzantines, Tome I (in French). Berlin: Akademie-Verlag. pp. 498–521.
- Juan López, Juan Bautista (2024). Manuel Gabalas: Biography, Intellectual Network, Works and Thought. Department of Medieval Studies of the Central European University Private University, Vienna.
- Trapp, Erich (1991). "Tagaris". In Kazhdan, Alexander (ed.). The Oxford Dictionary of Byzantium. Oxford and New York: Oxford University Press. p. 2006. ISBN 0-19-504652-8.
- Trapp, Erich (2001). Prosopographisches Lexikon der Palaiologenzeit. Austrian Academy of Sciences. ISBN 978-3700130031.
