= Manuel Tagaris =

14th century Byzantine general

- Μανουήλ Τάγαρις

Governor of Philadelphia
- In office 1309–1324
- Monarch: Andronikos II Palaiologos
- Succeeded by: Alexios Philanthropenos

Personal details
- Died: Before 1342
- Spouse(s): Unknown first wife Theodora Palaiologina Asanina
- Children: George Tagaris; Paul Palaiologos Tagaris (possibly); Unknown daughter

Military service
- Allegiance: Byzantine Empire; Sarukhanids (possibly)
- Rank: Megas Stratopedarches
- Battles/wars: Second Siege of Philadelphia; Byzantine civil war of 1321–1328; Third Siege of Philadelphia

Manuel Tagaris (Greek: Μανουήλ Τάγαρις, fl. c. 1309–1329) was a Byzantine general of the early 14th century active in Asia Minor, who rose to the rank of megas stratopedarches.

== Biography ==
=== Early life ===
Manuel Tagaris was of lowly origins, as he was the first prominent member of the Tagaris family, which at the time only comprised a handful of members.

=== Second Siege of Philadelphia ===
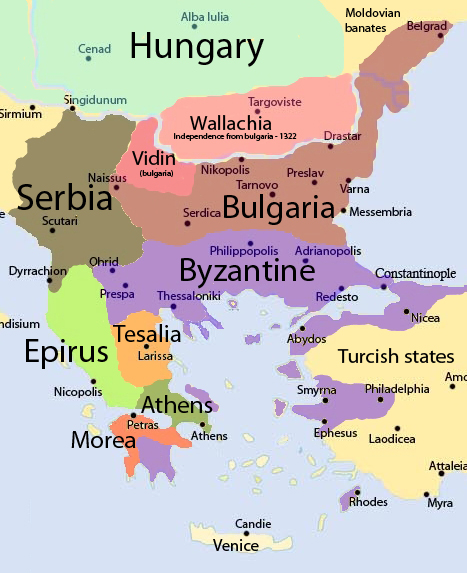
The Byzantine Empire in 1307

He joined the Byzantine army and became governor of Philadelphia around 1309. When the Germiyanids of Yakub I besieged Philadelphia in 1310/11, he repelled the Turkish attack. For this success, the Emperor Andronikos II Palaiologos appointed him to the rank of synkletikos, and even gave him the hand of his niece, Theodora Palaiologina Asanina, daughter of Tsar Ivan Asen III of Bulgaria, as his second wife.

=== Clashes with the clergy ===
However, during his long governorship of Philadelphia, he frequently clashed with the metropolitan bishop of Philadelphia, Theoleptos. Theoleptos considered himself as both a spiritual and military leader, which caused him to argue with Tagaris. During the siege of Philadelphia by the Germiyanids, Theoleptos sent his student Manuel Gabalas to Constantinople, in order to request aid against the Turks and rally support for the removal of Tagaris from his position, although he was unsuccessful in both endeavours.

Despite Gabalas showing support for Tagaris in 1310–1312, going against the wishes of Theoleptos, his relationship with him had deteriorated by 1312–1324. According to researcher Juan Bautista:

Gabalas labels Tagaris as an evil commander, an accursed, pernicious and abominable man. He accuses Tagaris of theft, looting, as well as attacking and pillaging Turks during their alliance, likely referring to the treaty established with the Germiyan Turks in 1311. These incidents probably occurred between 1312 and 1317. Gabalas suggests that Tagaris sought to provoke enemy hostility for personal gain and exhibited military ineptitude: looting in peace and hiding in actual warfare.

=== Byzantine civil war ===
In 1321, Tagaris travelled to Constantinople, and by April he was appointed to the position of megas stratopedarches by Andronikos II, with the aim of suppressing the rebellion of Andronikos III. However, when the emperor ordered him to pursue the prince and arrest him, Tagaris refused, claiming the order to be unenforceable, a view which was supported by the emperor's other advisors. Andronikos II sent him back to Philadelphia the same year.

=== Third Siege of Philadelphia ===
During the Third Siege of Philadelphia in 1322, Tagaris defended the city from the Germiyans of Yakub I and the Aydinids of Mehmed, who had blockaded the fortress of Saint Nicholas. However, Gabalas accused him of corruption, misappropriation of city funds, seizure of grain, and exploitation of farmers. As a result, Tagaris expelled him from the city. Eventually, after a year and seven months of the siege, Andronikos II pardoned the blind general Alexios Philanthropenos, who managed to relieve the city from the siege in early 1324.

After the siege, Tagaris was accused by Gabalas of devastating wheat fields, assaulting the Byzantine army, and even taking control of several towns in Asia Minor which he intended to divide with the Turks, as he had allegedly formed secret alliances with them and had married his daughter to the emir of Sarukhan. The citizens of Philadelphia believed him to be guilty and almost had him executed, until he returned to them the grain he had seized. He fled from the city at night, but was intercepted by the citizens of Philadelphia, and was ultimately forced to take refuge in Constantinople. There, he was found guilty by a synod (which is however not attested in the register of the Patriarchate), but was absolved by Andronikos II. Nevertheless, his fortress and wealth were seized, his family members and servants were imprisoned, and his sons were detained by the imperial government.

=== Later career ===
Anachronistic map of Anatolia around 1330

In 1329, he was sent to take the field against Orhan, the ruler of the rising Ottoman beylik. He probably died sometime before 1342.

== Family ==
Manuel married twice, first to a lady of unknown first name, but descended from the Monomachos and Doukas families, and then to Theodora Asenina Palaiologina. He had a daughter from the first marriage, and a son, George Tagaris, who also rose to become megas stratopedarches. Paul Palaiologos Tagaris was also possibly his son, or otherwise a relative.

In 1346, George Tagaris served as the emissary dispatched by Empress Anna of Savoy to the emir Sarukhan, seeking military aid against John VI Kantakouzenos during the Second Palaiologan Civil War. According to Kantakouzenos, she sent George because his father had been in friendly terms with the emir.

== Bibliography ==
- Guilland, Rodolphe (1967). "Le Stratopédarque et le Grand statopédarque". Recherches sur les institutions byzantines, Tome I (in French). Berlin: Akademie-Verlag. pp. 498–521.
- Juan López, Juan Bautista (2024). Manuel Gabalas: Biography, Intellectual Network, Works and Thought. Department of Medieval Studies of the Central European University Private University, Vienna.
- Nicol, Donald M. (1993) [1972]. The Last Centuries of Byzantium, 1261–1453 (Second ed.). Cambridge: Cambridge University Press. ISBN 978-0-521-43991-6.
- Shukurov, Rustam (2016). The Byzantine Turks, 1204-1461. BRILL. ISBN 9789004307759.
- Trapp, Erich (1991). "Tagaris". In Kazhdan, Alexander (ed.). The Oxford Dictionary of Byzantium. Oxford and New York: Oxford University Press. ISBN 0-19-504652-8.
- Trapp, Erich (2001). Prosopographisches Lexikon der Palaiologenzeit. Austrian Academy of Sciences. ISBN 978-3700130031.
