= Tagaris =

Byzantine family name

Tagaris (Greek: Τάγαρις) was a Byzantine family name. The family flourished in the 14th century. The family was of humble origins, but managed to raise its status through military service and advantageous marriages. Although originally Greek Orthodox by confession, two prominent members became Roman Catholics.

The name is derived from the tagarion (ταγάριον), a unit of dry measure, equal to about one eighth of a modios or five Roman pounds (1.6 kg).

The first known Tagaris was George, mentioned by Manuel Philes in a poem. He probably lived in the early 14th century. The first prominent member of the family was Manuel Tagaris, who rose to the rank of megas stratopedarches and was governor of Philadelphia from 1309 to 1324. He made two important marriages. His first marriage was to a woman of the houses of Doukas and Monomachos. Through his second marriage to Theodora, daughter of Tsar John III of Bulgaria and Irene, daughter of the Byzantine emperor Michael VIII, he related himself to the ruling Asanid and Palaiologos families.

Manuel had at least one son, George, who rose to the same rank as his father. George is recorded as having a niece who married a Monomachos. He may also have retained his father's close connection with Philadelphia. Another Tagaris, Paul Palaiologos Tagaris, may have been a son of either Manuel or George, but although he took the Palaiologos name, it is unclear if he was related to Theodora. Manuel also had at least one daughter by his first wife; she married a Tarchaneiotes.

During the civil wars of the 14th century, the Tagaris family were loyalists. Manuel supported the reigning emperor against his upstart grandson during the civil war of 1321–1328 and George supported the Emperor John V Palaiologos against the rebel John Kantakouzenos during the civil war of 1341–1347. On foreign policy the family favoured close ties with the Catholic powers of the West. George seems to have converted to Catholicism late in life. His brother Paul was a Catholic prelate for a time.

The last mention of the family is in 1400, when Anna Laskarina Tagarina brought a lawsuit before the court of the Patriarch of Constantinople. The family probably died out soon after.

== Sources ==
- Moffatt, Ann; Tall, Maxeme, eds. (2012). Constantine Porphyrogennetos - The Book of Ceremonies. Leiden: E. J. Brill.
- Nicol, Donald (1970). "Philadelphia and the Tagaris Family". Neo-Hellenika. 1: 9–17.
- Trapp, Erich (1991). "Tagaris". In Kazhdan, Alexander (ed.). The Oxford Dictionary of Byzantium. Oxford and New York: Oxford University Press. p. 2006. ISBN 0-19-504652-8.
