= Matthew of Ephesus =

14th century Metropolitan of Ephesus

Matthew of Ephesus (Greek: Ματθαῖος τῆς 'Εφέσου), also known as Manuel Gabalas (Greek: Μανουὴλ Γαβαλᾶς) or Matthew of Philadelphia (1272/3–1355/7), was a Byzantine Greek clergyman, writer and scholar. He was active in both theological and political life in Byzantium, serving as the metropolitan of Ephesus from 1329, until his excommunication in 1351, due to his anti-Palamite stance during the Hesychast controversy.

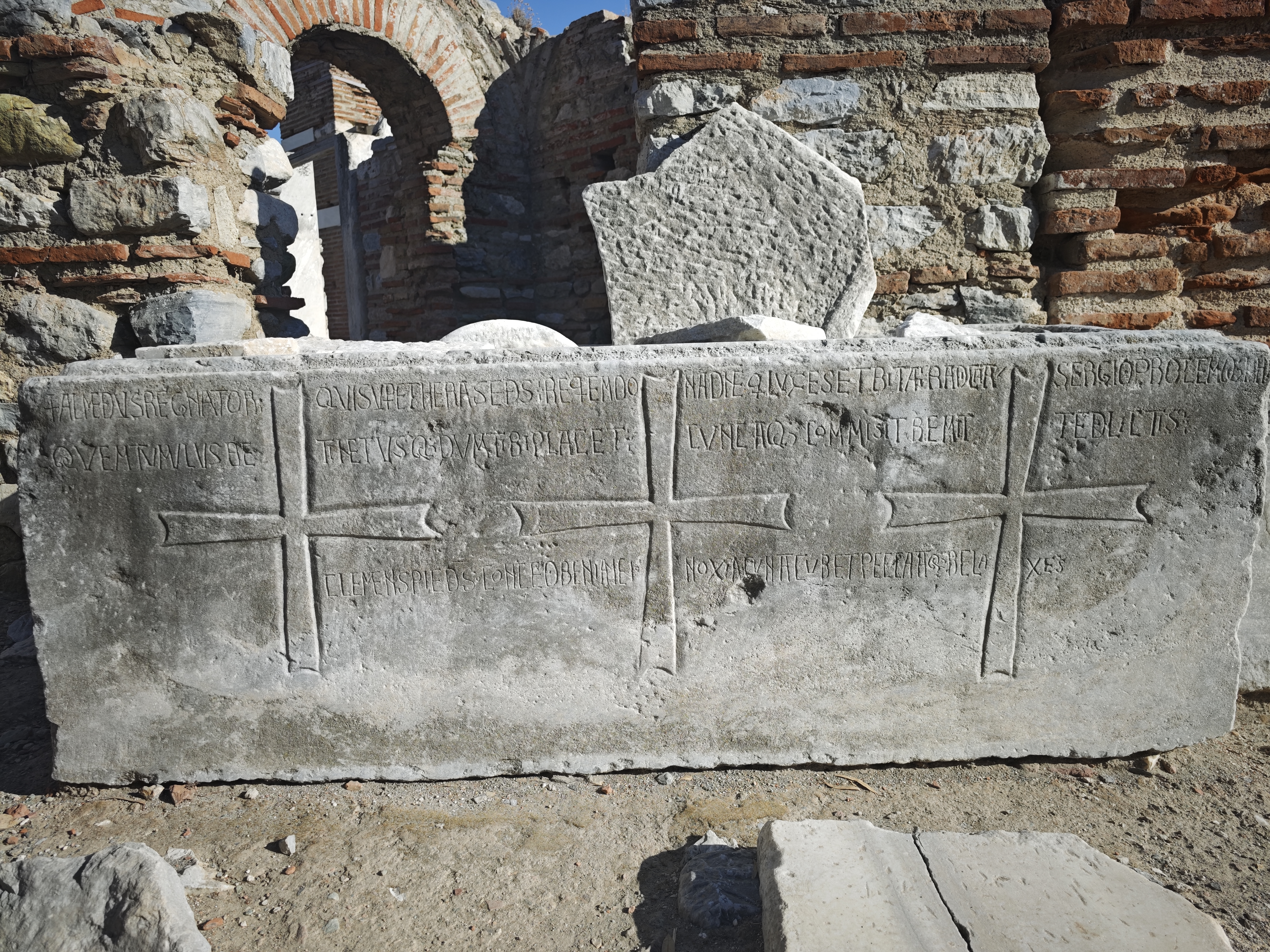
Ruins of the Basilica of Saint John that Matthew unsuccessfully attempted to reclaim and restore

== Early career ==
=== Early life ===
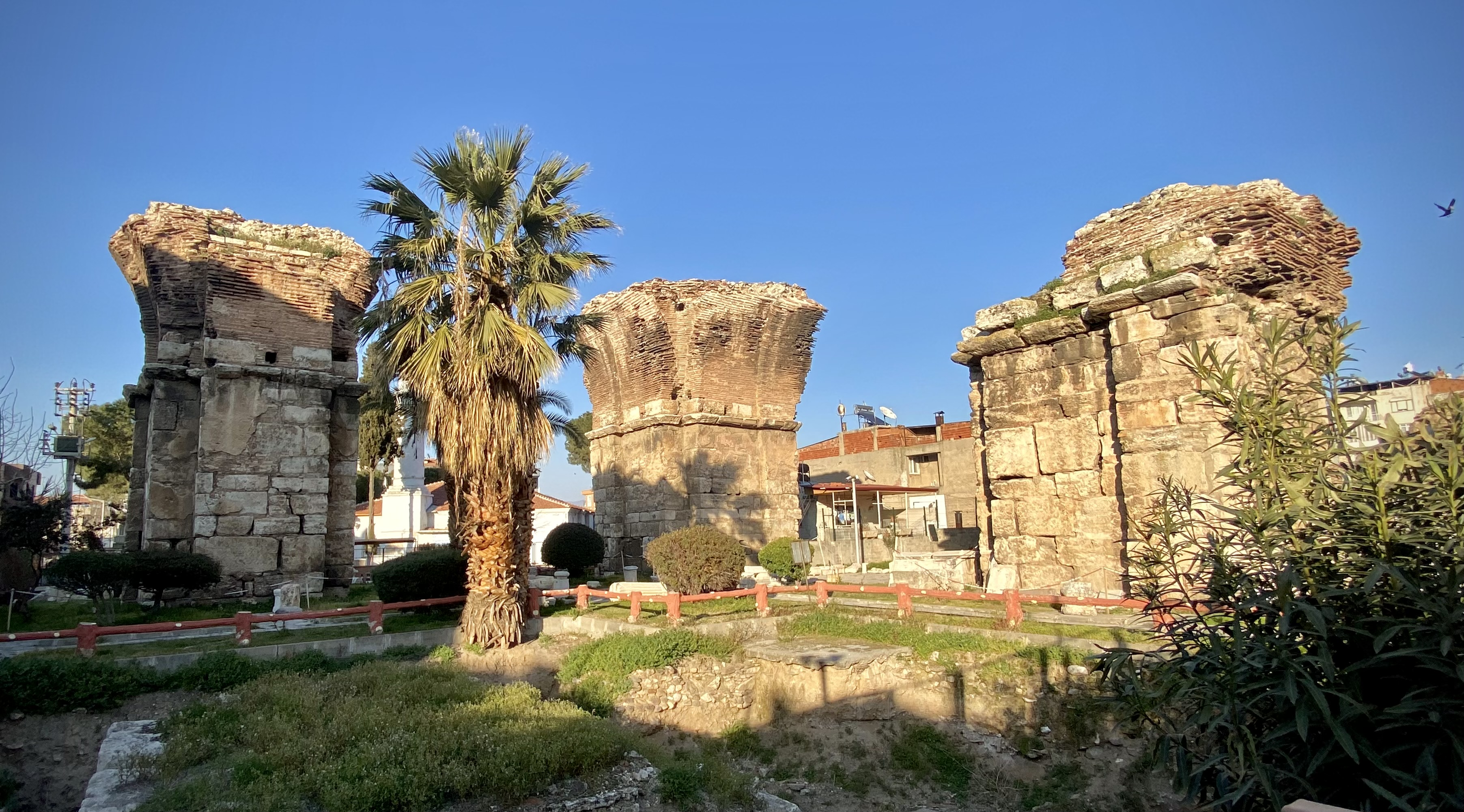
Ruins of the Church of Saint John of Philadelphia

Matthew was born in Philadelphia in 1272 or 1273, was originally named Manuel Gabalas, and possibly belonged to Philadelphia's provincial aristocracy. His surname may trace its origins to the city of Gabala, on the southern coast of Latakia, in Syria. Gabalas lived through three sieges of his hometown by Turkish Ghazis and through two Palaiologan civil wars. In 1309, he worked as anagnostes with Theoleptos of Philadelphia, and travelled on his behalf to Constantinople in order to unsuccessfully request aid against the Germiyanids, led by Yakub I, during the Second Siege of Philadelphia, along with the removal of the military governor Manuel Tagaris. He returned to Philadelphia in the winter of 1310-1311, fell sick, and recovered before the siege ended.

=== Role in Theoleptos’ Schism ===
From 1311–1317, Gabalas faced multiple difficulties, as Theoleptos initiated what would be known as the 6-year long Theoleptos' Schism, by refusing communion with Constantinople, because of his heavy opposition to the reconciliation with the Arsenites, which was initiated by Emperor Andronikos II Palaiologos. Due to Gabalas' disagreements with this stance, his possible sympathy with the Arsenites, his initial support for Manuel Tagaris (who was a political and personal enemy of Theoleptos), and his accusations of corruption against Theoleptos' nephew, made Theoleptos remove him from his position as chief notary. He placed Gabalas under canonical censure and barred him from participating in church duties.

Around that time, Gabalas' wife also died, and he was left alone to grieve and care for their one-year old child, John.

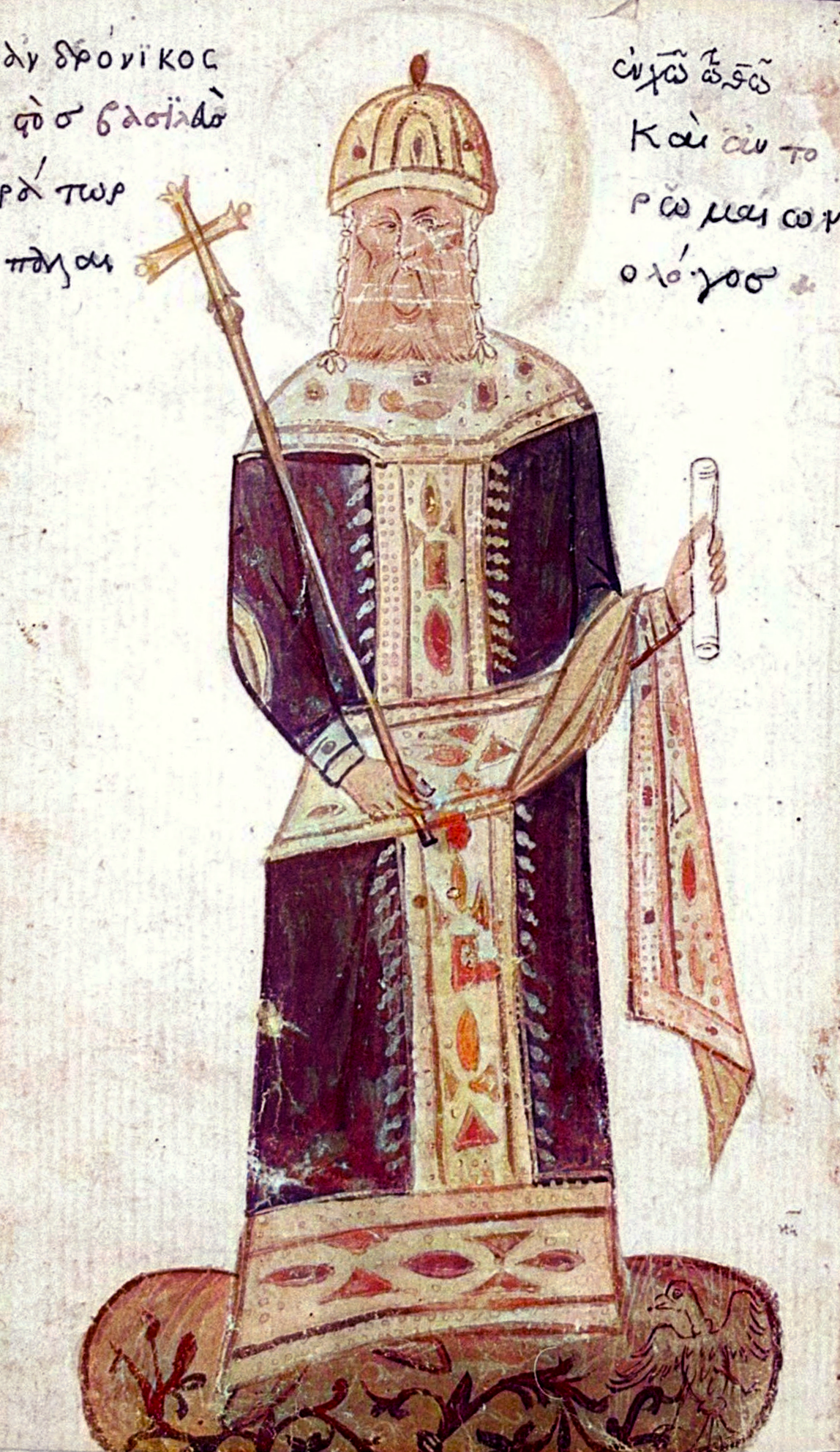
Miniature of the Emperor Andronikos II

Andronikos II called upon Theoleptos to come to Constantinople in 1313 to justify his actions, but he refused. Gabalas left for the capital, possibly to submit his petition for reinstatement to Andronikos II. He stayed there for a year, probably from autumn 1313 to autumn 1314. After John Glykys became Patriarch, Gabalas urged him to reinstate him and "to aspire to the Platonic ideal of the philosopher king". Gabalas may have joined Theoleptos on a short visit to the capital in early 1317, where he was made protonotarios. He may have travelled again to the capital in 1321. He reconciled with Theoleptos that same year and became his chartophylax between August and November. They returned to Philadelphia together around November.

During that time, Gabalas also wrote several letters to Andronikos II, urging him to aid the cities of Anatolia from Turkish raids, which had become all the more frequent. The emperor seems to have acknowledged these letters, as they were read aloud in public.

=== Expulsion from Philadelphia and monastic life ===
After the death of Theoleptos around November 1322 and amidst the Third Siege of Philadelphia, Gabalas was expelled from the city by Tagaris around December and would never again return to his home city. He took monastic vows before January 1323 in Constantinople and was given the monastic name Matthew. Matthew stayed in Constantinople from 1332 to 1328, where he increased his influence, survived a period of prolonged ilness, and lived through the Palaiologean Civil War of 1321–1328. He also travelled as an ambassador to Kiev during the winter of 1331–1332.

== Metropolitan of Ephesus ==
=== In Constantinople and Bryses ===
Anachronistic map of Anatolia around 1330

The city of Ephesus had fallen to the Beylik of Menteshe by 1308 and later to the Beylik of Aydin, which frequently engaged in piracy. The Turks had pillaged the Basilica of Saint John the Theologian, deported most of the local population to Thyrea, and either massacred or enslaved the rest of the inhabitants. Ephesus was left without a metropolitan bishop present in the city for a period of 35 years.

Matthew appears as the metropolitan of Ephesus in synodal documents from 2 December 1329 to June 1339. Due to the conditions in Ephesus, he acted as Metropolitan from Constantinople, and between 1331–1337 from Bryses.

=== Journey to Ephesus ===
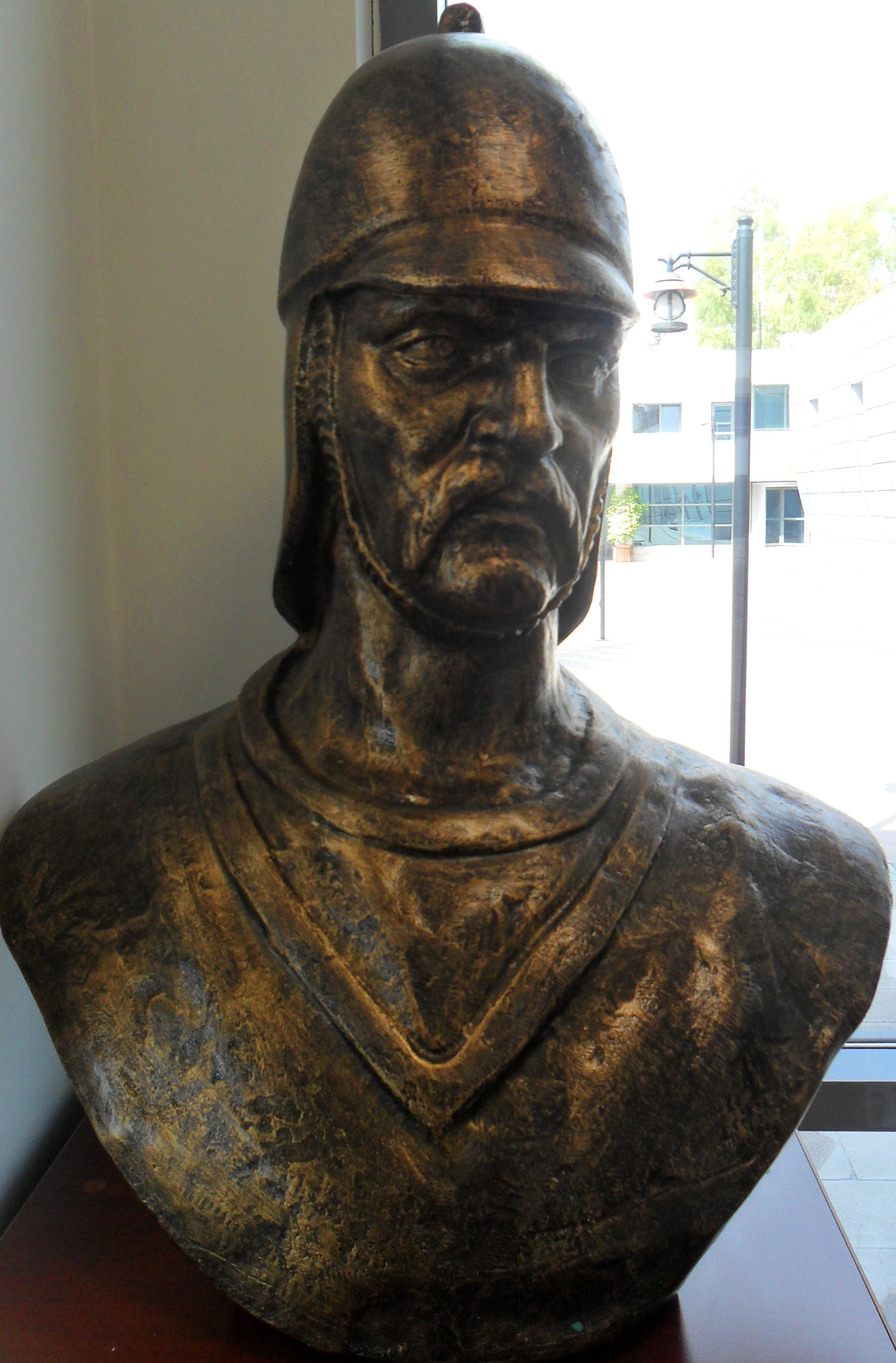
Bust of Umur in the Mersin Naval Museum

In 1339, Emperor Andronikos III Palaiologos sent Matthew with a letter to the Emir of Aydin, Umur, with the request of allowing him to travel to Ephesus, in order to assume his duties as metropolitan there. During the arduous 20-day long journey, Matthew and six other clergymen had to avoid pirates at sea between Chios and Klazomenai, and bandits in forests and mountains between Klazomenai and Ephesus. When they reached the devastated Smyrna, they found the city full of Turkish pirates, and Matthew wrote:

Accordingly we mourned, adding laments upon laments, and became like Aristeides in calamity. But we did not cry simply over a city, as did he, hurled down by earthquake, nor over the sight of statues, but over the expulsion of Christians and the colonization of foreign nations from the extremities of the earth.

At first, the Emir Umur refused to meet with Matthew, nor did he want to receive the letter of Andronikos III, denying him passage to Ephesus. But after Matthew bribed him, after being advised to do so by a man from Chios, the Emir allowed him to travel to the city.

=== In Ephesus ===
He finally reached Ephesus between June 1339 and February 1340. When he entered the city, he begun praying to God to endow him with the same power endowed to the Apostles when they went to preach to the nations, and to help him "free the Christians from the heavy yoke of slavery".

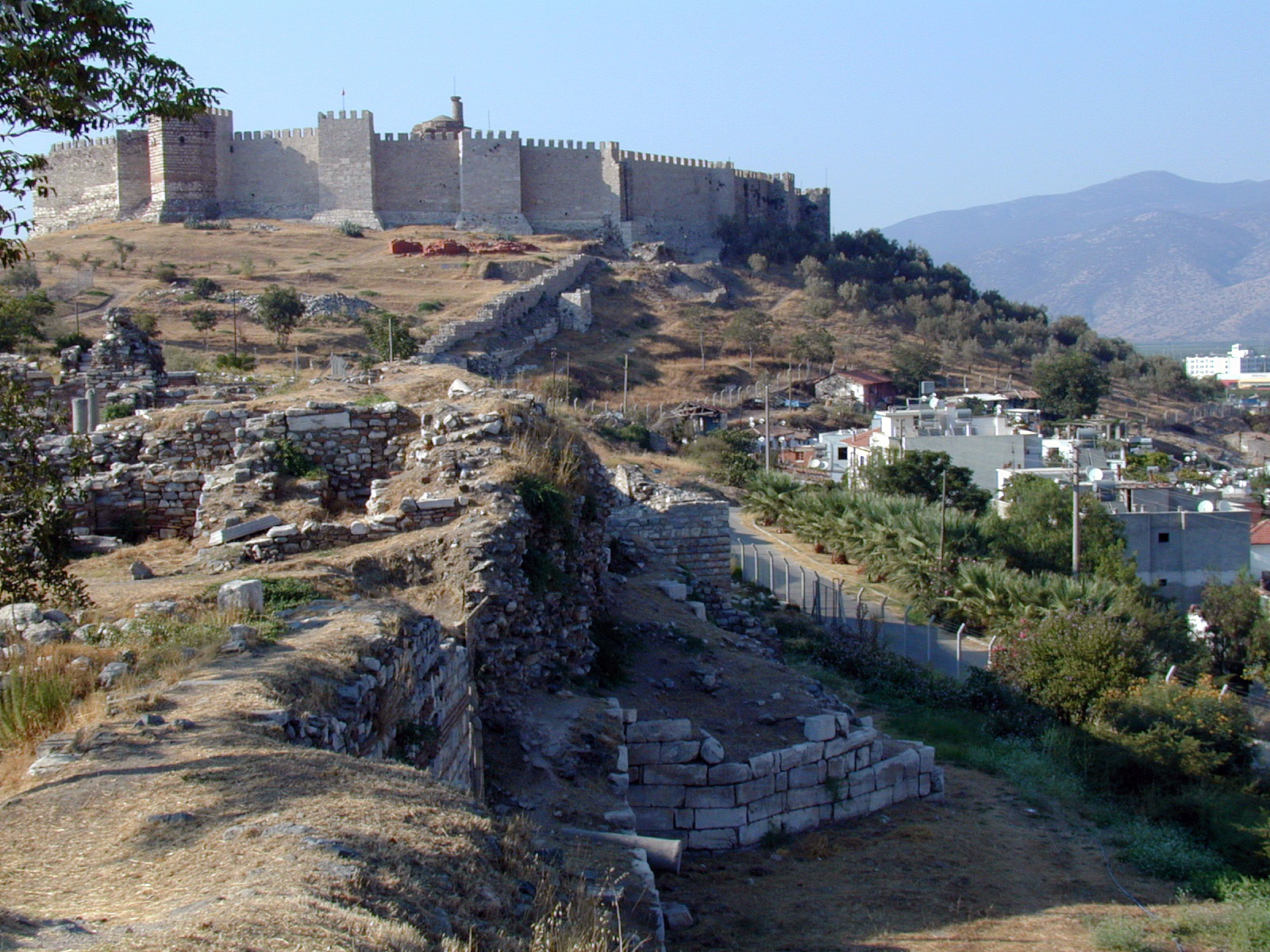
Ruins of the Byzantine ramparts of Ephesus

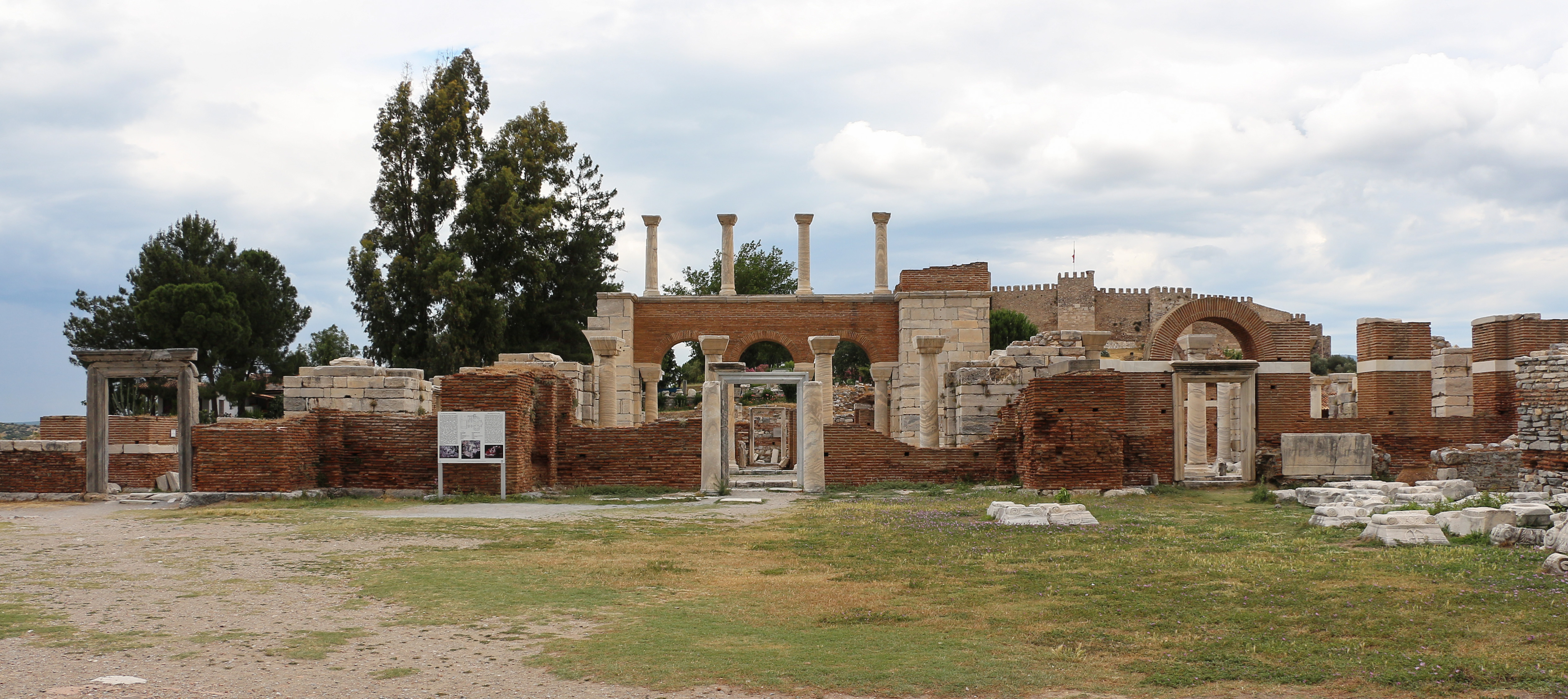
Ruins of the Basilica of Saint John

In Ephesus awaited the brother of Umur, Hidir, to whom Matthew gave gifts and requested the return of the church of Saint John, the house of the previous metropolitan and the properties of the metropolis, all of which had been seized by the Aydnids, but Hidir ignored the request. During the summer, Matthew fell ill and came close to dying because there were no physicians to care for him in the city, but he managed to recover. He then made the same request to Hidir, but the bey refused to return anything, as the church had been turned to a mosque, and the house of the previous metropolitan had been taken over by an Imam. Matthew continued to insist on getting back the properties of the metropolis, but Hidir refused every time, until he relented and gave him, and the other six clergymen that were with him, a small house he had taken from an old muslim woman. In his letters, Matthew sarcastically wrote that:

For having removed some old woman, and she an Ismaelite, from her own house he put in there, o wonder, the exarch of Asia [Metropolitan of Ephesus], and he gave such a gift, one might say, that if it were not worthy of the recipient, [at least] it was worthy of the giver (that I might say the opposite of what Diogenes said to Alexander). And he added to such a great benefaction a most small piece of land for cultivation, which being far from the city would constitute not [a source of] nourishment to its owner but [a source of] destruction.

He and the other six clergymen were "reduced to a very meager economic existence", while his flock mostly consisted of surviving inhabitants who had since become prisoners and slaves of the Aydnids. The new Muslim inhabitants of the city also acted aggressively towards the priests, as they frequently threw rocks at their small house during the night, but did not attack them during the day as to not disobey Hidir's command:

For it was not sufficient for the lawless ones that they neither wish to turn over to us the authority over the great church and house and property belonging to it from the beginning, [...] nor are they sparing of curses and blasphemies against God and us, but they have plotted an evil scheme either to kill us or at any rate to make us flee and some such evil are they contriving. Attacking with rocks in the depth of the night when the first cocks are not yet crowing, they hurl stones against our roof, aiming at the bed where we lie. These rocks, smashing the roof tiles, often fall inside.

Some of his letters during his time in Ephesus were seized by the Aydinids and did not reach Constantinople.

Sometime during his time as metropolitan, Matthew accused the metropolitan of Pyrgion (a seat which used to belong to Ephesus) of perjury and murder, while unlawfully treating the metropolis as a suffragan bishopric. He sent a letter to Umur, referring to the leader of Aydin as his "son", and asking for a deposition decree of Pyrgion’s bishop, falsely claiming to have the synod’s consent. A synod investigated the claims and acquitted the bishop of Pyrgion of all charges.

=== Excommunication and Death ===
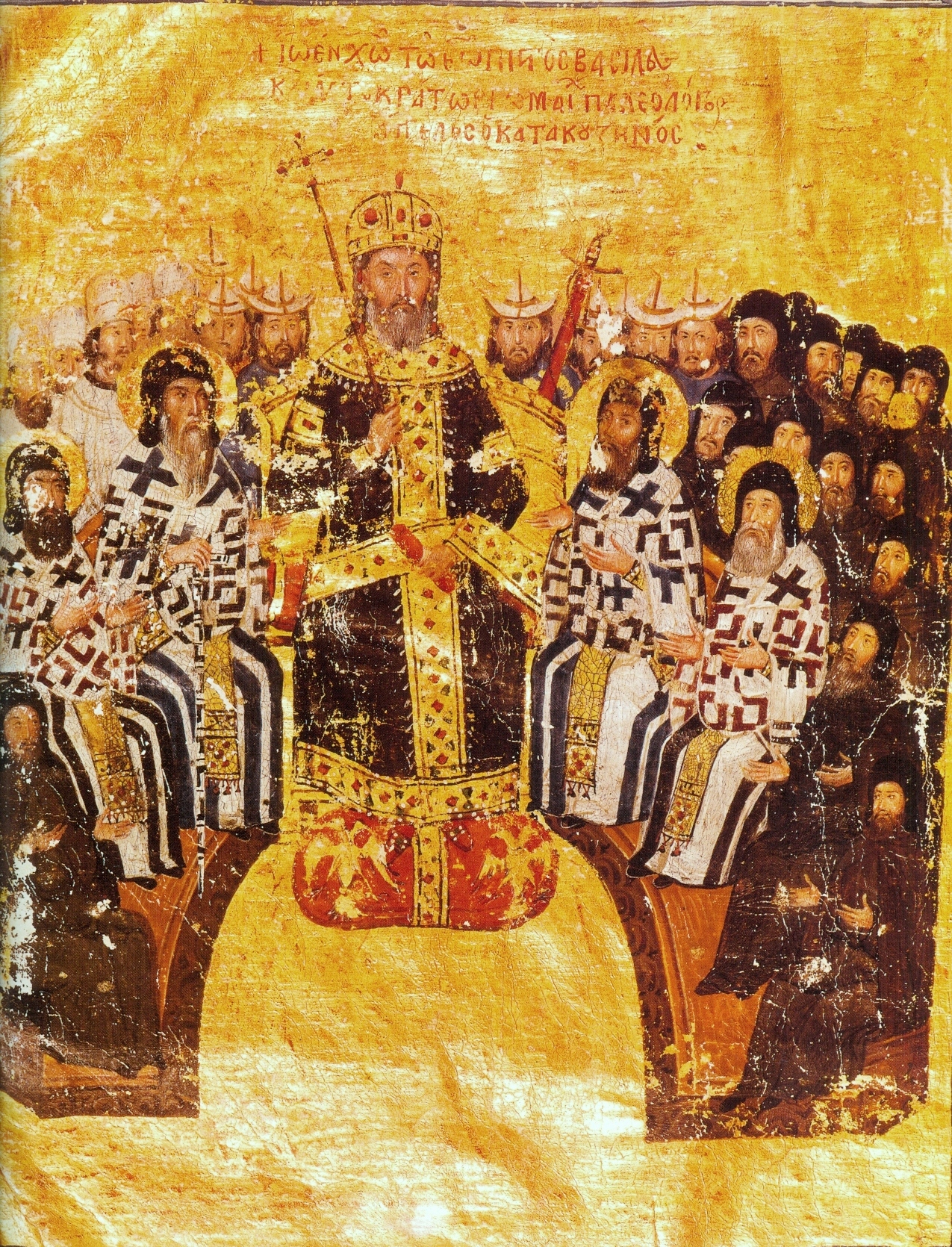
Byzantine Emperor John VI presiding over the Hesychast Council

Matthew likely returned to Constantinople in 1344 and lived in a cell at a local monastery. After two decades of serving as metropolitan in Ephesus, his false accusations against the metropolitan of Pyrgion, his ambitions for becoming patriarch, his 1347 involvement in the Hesychast controversy against Gregory Palamas, and his support for Barlaam of Seminara and Gregorios Akindynos, led to his deposition and condemnation in May or June 1351 by the Fifth Council of Constantinople, of Emperor John VI Kantakouzenos. His friend, Nikephoros Gregoras, wrote that the Palamites supposedly tore the garments and pulled the hair of Matthew and Joseph of Ganos during the synod of August 1351. After which, they were allowed to leave, but with prohibitions on writing and speaking. Matthew of Ephesus died excommunicated for “being driven away from the right path” sometime between 1355–1357.

== Character and works ==
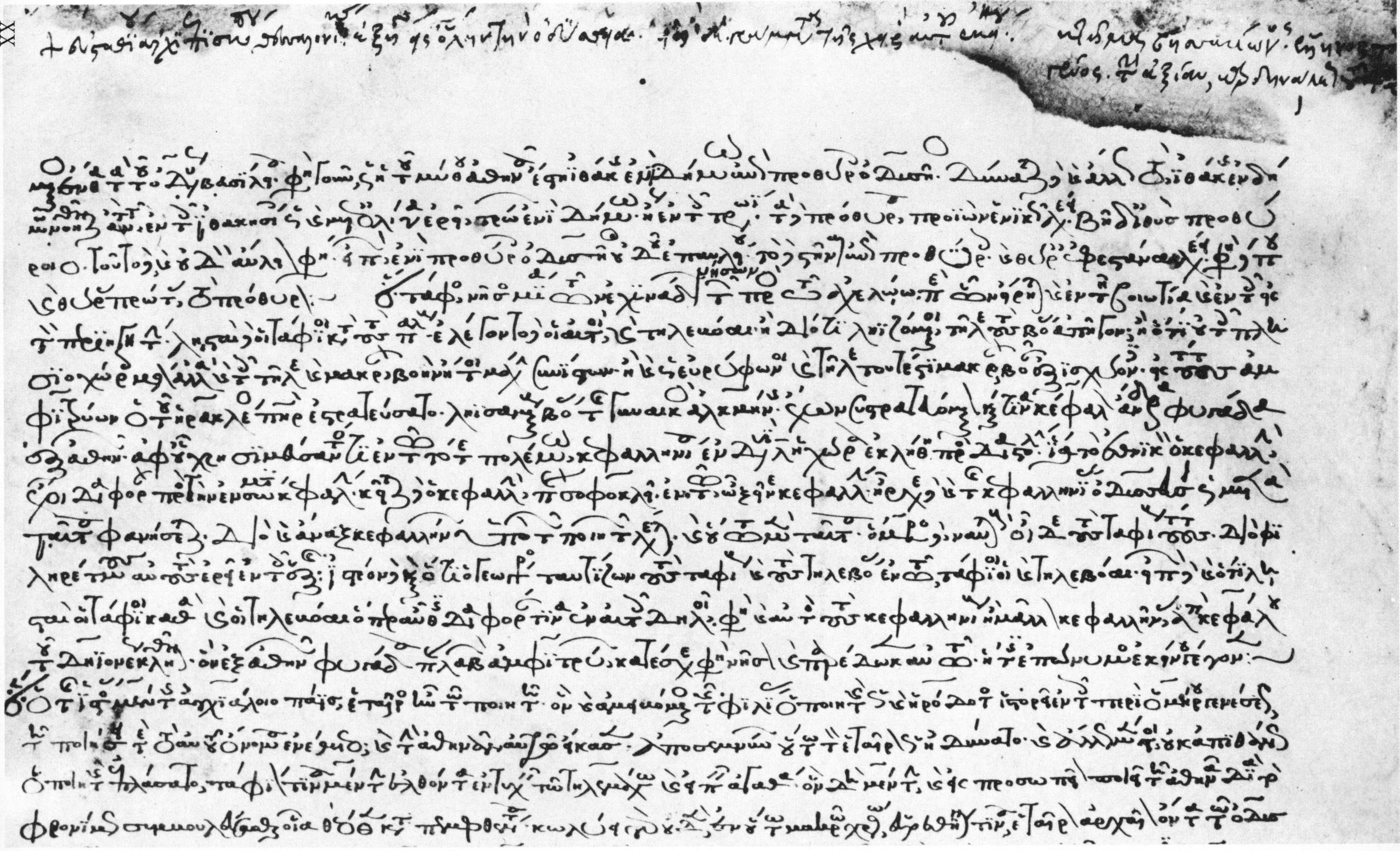
Commentary on the Odyssey by Eustathius of Thessalonica

Matthew was impacted greatly not just by contemporary religious figures, like Theoleptos of Philadelphia, George of Cyprus and George Pachymeres, but also by the classics and ancient Greek philosophy. He frequently referenced Homer, Plato and Plutarch in his writings, was interested in astronomy, Greek mythology and the Twelve Olympians, and was particularly fond of the Odyssey and the character of Odysseus, of whom he wrote extensively about. Overall, he produced a vast quantity of short writings during his lifetime, which connect his ascetical, theological and philosophical thought, the collection of which is known as the "200 Chapters".

He was well learned, ambitious and connected to some of the most learned and influential men within the Byzantine Empire, keeping contact with them through the frequent exchange of letters. Some of the most prominent figures he had contacts with were: Michael Gabras, Nikephoros Choumnos, Nikephoros Gregoras, Theodore Metochites, Irene-Eulogia Choumnaina, Joseph the Philosopher, Nikephoros Moschopoulos, Gregory of Dyrrachium, Theodore Kabasilas, Nicholas Philaretos, Gregory Kleidas, George Chatzikes, Theodore Xanthopoulos, the Megas Doux Syrgiannes Palaiologos Philanthropenos, the Patriarchs Nephon I and John Glykys, and the Emperors Andronikos II, Andronikos III and John VI Kantakouzenos.

His friend and associate, Nikephoros Gregoras, praises the strength and intellect of Matthew as such:

Moreover, the chief priest of the Ephesians was outstanding. He was an elderly man, for he had already passed his eightieth year, but his mind and all his senses were strong, and even stronger than when he was young. He possessed a dignified appearance, a smooth voice, and his philosophy had grown to include both Greek and divine wisdom.

However, his ambitions and anti-Palamite stance, along with the waning of his ecclesiastical influence during the reign of Kantakouzenos, led to his excommunication and deposition from Metropolitan. He and other prominent clergymen were replaced by new Palamite church leaders.

Amongst some his works are the "Dialogue on the Immortality of Adam and Eve", a theological text written between 1317 and August 1321, the "Personal Exhortation for Princess Irene-Eulogia on the Death of kyr Theoleptos of Philadelphia", a funeral oration written in 1323/24, the "Prayer Pronounced upon Our Entrance into Ephesus", which he read when he first arrived to the city in 1339/40, and "The Wanderings of Odysseus", a prosification of the Odyssey divided into 15 chapters, presenting Odysseus’ journey as an "ascetic quest for virtue, reminiscent of a saint’s life, filled with trials that lead to sanctification and divine reward". He also transcripted Aristotle's Topics and contributed to the transcription of George Pachymeres' "Commentary on Aristotle's Physics" and "Commentary on Aristotle's Organon".

== Bibliography ==
- Athanassios, Angelou (1984). Classical, Byzantine and Renaissance Studies for Robert Browning. Matthaios Gabalas and his Kephalaia. Vol. 5. Maistor. ISBN 978-0-9593626-1-9.
- Browning, Robert (1992). Homo Byzantinus: Papers in Honor of Alexander Kazhdan. A Fourteenth-Century Prose Version of the "Odyssey". Vol. 46. Dumbarton Oaks Papers. ISBN 9780884021988.
- "Database of Byzantine Book Epigrams. Person: Matthaios of Ephesus, also known as Manuel Gabalas (1271–1360)". Ghent University.
- Juan López, Juan Bautista (2024). Manuel Gabalas: Biography, Intellectual Network, Works and Thought (PDF) (PhD thesis). Department of Medieval Studies of the Central European University Private University, Vienna.
- Kourousis, Stavros I. (1972). Μανουὴλ Γαβαλᾶς εἴτα Ματθαῖος μητροπολίτης Ἐφέσου (1271/2-1355/60). Α΄: Τὰ βιογραφικά. Τυπογραφείον αδελφών Μυρτίδη.
- Monticini, Francesco (1 January 2019). "Azione come praxis. Riflessioni su scienza e conoscenza in Manuele Gabalas". Roma Tre University.
- Foss, Clive (1979). Ephesus After Antiquity. Cambridge University Press.
- Kaltsogianni, Eleni (2023). Alexakis, Alexander; Georgakopoulos, Dimitrios S. (eds.). Kalligraphos–Essays on Byzantine Language, Literature and Palaeography: From Byzantine Historiography to Post-Byzantine Poetry. Matthew of Ephesus and his Dialogue on the Immortality of Adam and Eve. Vol. 42. De Gruyter. ISBN 978-3111009810.
- Kazhdah, Alexander P. (1991). The Oxford Dictionary Of Byzantium. Vol. 2. Oxford University Press. ISBN 0-19-504652-8.
- Nicol, Donald M. (1994). "Eirene-Eulogia Choumnaina Palaiologina, princess and abbess, died c. 1355". The Byzantine Lady: Ten Portraits, 1250-1500. Cambridge University Press. ISBN 978-0-521-45531-2.
- Reinsch, Diether Roderich (1974). Die Briefe des Matthaios von Ephesos im Codex Vindobonensis Theol. gr. 174. Mielke.
- Treu, M. (1901). Matthaios metropolit von Ephesos: Uebcr sein leben und seine schriften. Potsdam.
- Ramsay, William (1890). The Historical Geography of Asia Minor. Royal Geographical Society.
- Sinkewicz, Robert E., ed. (1992). Theoleptos of Philadelphia: The Monastic Discourses. Toronto: Pontifical Institute of Medieval Studies. ISBN 0-88844-111-8.
- Vianès, Laurence; Samra, Abou (2003). "Revue interdisciplinaire sur la Grèce archaïque: Les Errances d'Ulysse par Matthieu d'Éphèse, alias Manuel Gabalas (XIVe siècle)". Gaia. No. 7. Erga. ISSN 1287-3349.
- Vryonis, Speros (1971). The Decline of Medieval Hellenism in Asia Minor and the Process of Islamization from the Eleventh through the Fifteenth Century. University of California Press. ISBN 0-520-01597-5.
