= Paul Palaiologos Tagaris =

14th-century Byzantine monk and imposter

- Latin Patriarch of Constantinople
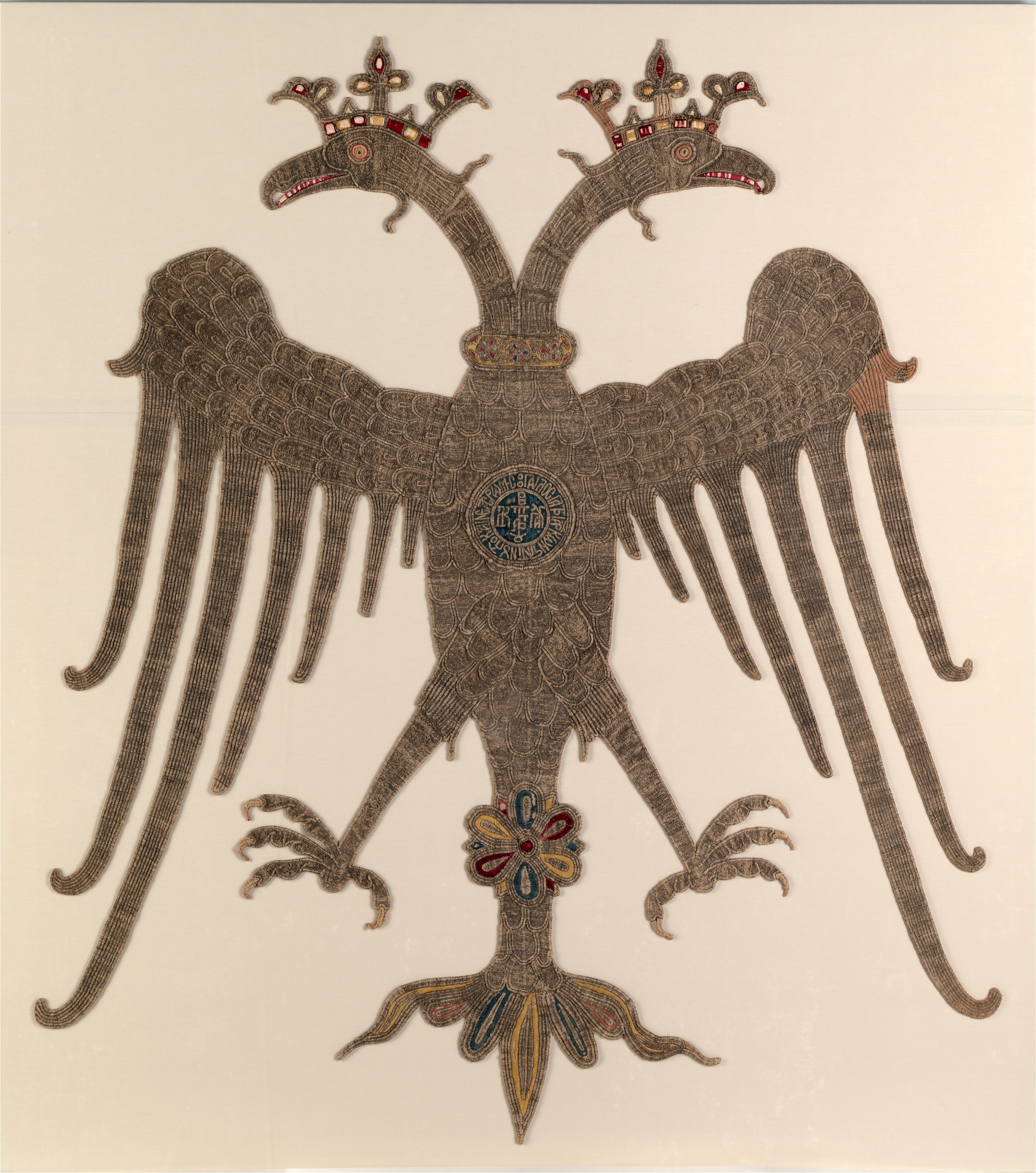
- Double-headed eagle on an altar cloth, believed to have belonged to Paul Tagaris, now in the Metropolitan Museum of Art
- Diocese: Constantinople (Roman Catholic)
- Installed: 1379/80
- Term ended: 1384
- Other post: Bishop of Taurezion (Greek Orthodox)
- Previous posts: Patriarchal exarch of Antioch (c. 1368–1370); Bishop of Taurezion (c. 1375)

Orders
- Ordination: c. 1368

Personal details
- Born: c. 1320/1340
- Died: after 1394
- Denomination: Eastern Orthodox, between 1379–1394 Roman Catholic

Paul Palaiologos Tagaris (Greek: Παῦλος Παλαιολόγος Τάγαρις, c. 1320/1340 – after 1394) was a Byzantine Greek monk and impostor. A scion of the Tagaris family, Paul also claimed a somewhat dubious connection with the Palaiologos dynasty that ruled the Byzantine Empire at the time. He fled his marriage as a teenager and became a monk, but soon his fraudulent practices embroiled him in scandal. Fleeing Constantinople, he traveled widely, from Palestine to Persia and Georgia and eventually, via Ukraine and Hungary to Italy, Latin Greece, Cyprus and France.

During his long and tumultuous career, Paul was appointed an Orthodox bishop, sold ordinations to ecclesiastical offices, pretended to be the Orthodox Patriarch of Jerusalem, switched from Greek Orthodoxy to Roman Catholicism and back again, supported both the See of Rome and the Avignon anti-popes in the Western Schism, and managed to be named Latin Patriarch of Constantinople. In the end, his deceptions unmasked, he returned to Constantinople, where he repented and confessed his sins before a synod in 1394.

== Early life and family ==
The main source on Paul's life is the document of his confession before the patriarchal synod in Constantinople, which is undated, but included among documents of the years 1394–1395. It was published in modern times by Franz Ritter von Miklosich and Joseph Muller (eds.), Acta et Diplomata Græca medii ævi sacra et profana, Vol. II, Acta Patriarchatus Constantinopolitanæ, Vienna 1860. The confession is complemented by an account of his visit to Paris in 1390, written by a monk of the Abbey of Saint-Denis and included in the anonymous Chronique du religieux de Saint-Denys, contenant le règne de Charles VI de 1380 à 1422.

Paul Tagaris was apparently a scion of the Tagaris family, a lineage which first appears in the early 14th century. His father is unnamed, but is described by Paul as a valiant and famous soldier, so that he is possibly identifiable either with the megas stratopedarches Manuel Tagaris, or with the latter's son, George Tagaris. Paul Tagaris claimed to be related to the ruling imperial dynasty of the Palaiologoi and adopted the surname for himself. Manuel Tagaris was indeed married to Theodora Asanina Palaiologina, daughter of Ivan Asen III of Bulgaria, and niece of Emperor Andronikos II Palaiologos, but even if Paul was Manuel's son, Theodora was, according to the Byzantinist Donald Nicol, "almost certainly not the mother of Paul".

According to Nicol, Tagaris was probably born in the 1320s, while other modern sources like the Oxford Dictionary of Byzantium and the Prosopographisches Lexikon der Palaiologenzeit put it later, around the year 1340. His parents arranged his marriage at the age of 14 or 15, but soon he abandoned his wife and left Constantinople to become a monk in Palestine. After a while he returned to Constantinople, where he quickly became embroiled in scandal: he claimed that an icon in his possession had miraculous properties, and made money out of gullible believers. This affair scandalized his family, but Patriarch Kallistos I declined to take action against him. It was not until the patriarch went on a visit to Serbia in July 1363 that his locum tenens, the hieromonk Dorotheos, confiscated the icon and forced Paul to return to Palestine.

== Career in the East ==
In Palestine, Paul was able to secure his ordination as a deacon by the Patriarch of Jerusalem Lazaros, who took him under his protection (c. 1364). Shortly after, Lazaros left for Constantinople, and his locum tenens Damianos brought charges against Paul, who was forced to abandon Jerusalem for Antioch. In Antioch, Paul once again managed to befriend an influential figure, the newly elected (1368) Patriarch Michael, who not only ordained him a priest, but eventually made him patriarchal exarch and administrator of the Patriarchate's affairs. It was not long before Paul began abusing his authority: he sacked serving bishops and put their sees up for sale, threatening to report those who complained to the Turkish authorities. Soon he claimed the title of Patriarch of Jerusalem for himself and began to ordain bishops, even in territories subject to the Patriarchate of Constantinople. In 1370, he went to Iconium and then to Persia and Georgia, where, according to his own recollection, he adjudicated a dispute among three rival claimants of the throne, finding in favour of the highest bidder. No such dispute is recorded in Georgian sources at this time.

At this point, again according to his own account, he felt remorse and considered returning to Constantinople, where he would give the fortune he had amassed to the poor, but he was forestalled by the Bishop of Tyre and Sidon, who found him and delivered an offer by the Patriarch of Antioch to name him bishop of Taurezion (an unidentified location, suggested as being either in the Taurus Mountains or in the Tauric peninsula, i.e. the Crimea). Paul accepted, and was apparently consecrated by the Bishop of Tyre and Sidon (c. 1375). At the same time, the Patriarch of Constantinople Philotheos I Kokkinos heard about his dealings in the east, and at Trebizond Paul was met by a messenger from the Patriarch who demanded his immediate return to Constantinople to stand trial.

== Latin Patriarch of Constantinople ==
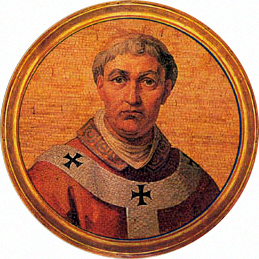
Pope Urban VI (modern painting, Basilica of Saint Paul Outside the Walls, Rome)

Reluctant to face the Patriarch's wrath, Paul once more decided to flee, and try his luck in Rome. Such a move would be highly unusual for an Orthodox priest, but may be explained, according to Nicol, by his family's links with pro-Catholic circles in the Byzantine capital: George Tagaris, his putative brother or father, was among those who supported the Union of the Churches and had received letters of encouragement from Pope Innocent VI. To avoid passing near Constantinople, Paul was forced to make a broad detour. He took a ship, probably from Trebizond, to the Crimea, where he presented the local governor of the Golden Horde with jewels from the treasure he had amassed. In exchange, he received an escort through the Horde lands (modern Ukraine) to the Kingdom of Hungary, and thence to Rome. There he secured an audience with Pope Urban VI, claiming to be the Orthodox Patriarch of Jerusalem. Paul presented himself to the Pope as a penitent, offered a confession, and embraced the Catholic faith. Impressed by Paul's humble demeanour, the Pope named him (in late 1379 or early 1380) to the titular post of Latin Patriarch of Constantinople, which had been vacant since September 1378, when its incumbent, Giacomo da Itri, had declared his allegiance to the Avignon anti-pope Clement VII. Urban also named Paul apostolic legate for all countries "east of Durazzo".

After his appointment to such a broad office, a "second Pope" as Paul called it, he abandoned his simple monastic habit and adopted magnificent vestments to suit his new rank, wore ostentatious jewellery, and, according to the chronicler of Saint-Denis, went about on horseback surrounded by a magnificently outfitted entourage. A likely example of Paul's splendid vestments and accoutrements at this time is a richly embroidered altar cloth, featuring a Byzantine double-headed eagle with a monogram on its breast and the legend "Paul, Patriarch of Constantinople and New Rome" in Greek, now in the collection of the Metropolitan Museum of Art in New York City.

As Constantinople had been recovered by the Byzantines in 1261, the seat of the Latin Patriarch of Constantinople had been moved to Negroponte, which still remained in Latin hands, in 1314. Soon after his investment, Paul stopped at Ancona, on his way to Greece. He remained in the city for several weeks, fêted by the locals, and presented them with purported relics: on 4 March 1380 the head of James the Just, followed on 17 April by the foot of Saint Anne and a nail from the True Cross. As Nicol comments, "one may be tempted to question the authenticity, and still more the provenance, of his donation". The documents of grant, preserved in the cathedral of Ancona, are signed by Paul and a certain "Alexios Palaiologos the Despot", allegedly a son of the Byzantine emperor but in reality, according to Nicol, probably "another figment of Paul's fertile imagination".

From 1380 until 1384, Paul remained at his see in Negroponte. A relative of his, George Tagaris—probably a different person than Manuel Tagaris' son—was called in to help with the administration of the patriarchal domains. His tenure was troubled, as the local Orthodox clergy appealed to the Venetian authorities for protection against his exactions, while the Latin Archbishop of Athens, Antonio Ballester, complained of the Patriarch's interference in his diocese. Furthermore, his lease of some of the Church lands in 1383 to a Venetian from Crete, Giacomo Grimani, proved a source of protracted legal trouble since Grimani, in the words of the French medievalist Raymond-Joseph Loenertz, "revealed himself as much a scoundrel as the Patriarch". In 1384, Paul was once again denounced as an impostor to the Pope, possibly by Ballester, who was named vicar-general of the Patriarchate in the same year, and who had held the same office during the 1378–1379 vacancy. Paul had apparently left his diocese before his denunciation, and resumed his wanderings. In 1385, he was in Cyprus, where he crowned James of Lusignan as King of Cyprus in exchange for 30,000 gold coins, and continued granting ecclesiastical appointments on the island as if he were still patriarch.

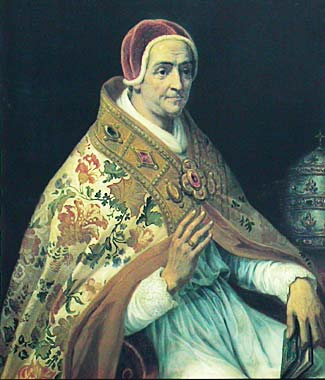
Avignon anti-pope Clement VII (modern painting by Calixte Serrur)

In 1388 he returned to Rome, possibly hoping that the accusations against him had been forgotten in the meanwhile. He was arrested, tried and imprisoned, but was released after Urban VI's death in October 1389 and the general amnesty granted by the new pope, Boniface IX. Leaving Rome, Paul went to the court of Amadeus VII of Savoy. There he presented himself as a distant relative to the Count—a claim likely relying on his tenuous links to the Palaiologoi, who in turn were remotely linked to the House of Savoy via Empress Anna of Savoy, Amadeus VII's great-aunt—and as a victim of papal persecution on account of his support for the Avignon papacy. Paul's claims of kinship were dubious, but Amadeus was moved by the plight of a fellow Avignon supporter, and accepted him as the legitimate Latin Patriarch of Constantinople. He provided Paul with money and an escort of twelve horses and twelve servants, and sent him on to the papal court of Avignon.

Paul received a magnificent welcome at Avignon, where he was fêted by Clement VII and his cardinals. Clement, moved by his guest's tales of suffering at the hands of the Roman popes, loaded him with gifts and honours and sent him north to Paris. There, King Charles VI of France likewise prepared a triumphal welcome for his illustrious guest. Paul was an exotic and popular sight in the French capital, and was lavishly hosted and entertained. He obviously enjoyed his long sojourn there, "safe in a place where his past was unknown and his deception was unlikely to be discovered", according to Nicol. For further safety, he communicated only via an interpreter in his employ. On his visit to the Abbey of Saint-Denis, he claimed that there were several relics of the abbey's patron saint—commonly confused with the Athenian saint Dionysius the Areopagite at the time—to be found back in Greece, and promised to help the monks bring them to France. His proposal was enthusiastically taken up, and two monks received permission and funds from the king to accompany Paul back to Greece. When the party arrived in the port in Italy from which they would sail for Greece, however, Paul bribed the captain of the ship to pretend that bad weather would delay their departure. In the same night, he and his servants set sail with their entire baggage, leaving the two monks behind. It was only in Rome, where the monks went in search of answers for Paul's behaviour, that they learned the true identity of their travelling companion. From them the chronicler of the abbey later received his information.

== Return to Constantinople ==
According to Nicol, the achievement of the "accomplished sinner" Paul was without parallel: "No-one ever made such a profitable business out of changing sides, first in the schism between the Greek and Latin Churches, and then in the schism between the pope in Rome and the pope in Avignon. It is no mean feat to arrive in Rome as Orthodox patriarch of Jerusalem and then to be received in Avignon as Catholic patriarch of Constantinople."

Now, though, having irreparably destroyed his reputation and ties with both papal courts, Paul was left with no option other than to return to Constantinople. In 1394, he was back in the Byzantine capital, where he appeared before Patriarch Antony IV, before whom he confessed his sins, abjured his conversion to Catholicism, and pleaded for mercy. As Nicol writes, "Only on one point did he protest that he had been wrongfully accused; for, despite rumours and tales contrived against him, he had never indulged in fornication, miracle-mongering, or the practice of magic". The Patriarch passed Paul's case on to the full patriarchal synod, before which Paul was obliged to repeat his confession twice, and then once more before an assembly of the people. The records of these sessions, kept by the patriarchal scribe Perdikes, are the main source on Paul's life. The final portion of the manuscript, containing the verdict, is missing, but both the synod and the people had recommended a pardon, so it is likely that he was forgiven. His subsequent life is unknown.

== Sources ==
- Ball, Jennifer L. (2006). "A Double-Headed Eagle Embroidery: From Battlefield to Altar". Metropolitan Museum Journal. 41: 59–64. doi:10.1086/met.41.20320660. ISSN 0077-8958. JSTOR 20320660. S2CID 191850328.
- Loenertz, R.-J. (1966). "Cardinale Morosini et Paul Paléologue Tagaris, patriarches, et Antoine Ballester, vicaire du Pape, dans le patriarcat de Constantinople (1332-34 et 1380-87)". Revue des études byzantines (in French). 24: 224–256. doi:10.3406/rebyz.1966.1373. ISSN 0771-3347.
- Nicol, Donald M. (1970). "The Confessions of a bogus Patriarch: Paul Tagaris Palaiologos, Orthodox Patriarch of Jerusalem and Catholic Patriarch of Constantinople in the fourteenth century". The Journal of Ecclesiastical History. 21 (4): 289–299. doi:10.1017/S0022046900049113. ISSN 0022-0469.
- Talbot, Alice-Mary (1991). "Tagaris, Paul Palaiologos". In Kazhdan, Alexander (ed.). The Oxford Dictionary of Byzantium. Oxford and New York: Oxford University Press. p. 2006. ISBN 0-19-504652-8.
- Trapp, Erich (1991). "Tagaris". In Kazhdan, Alexander (ed.). The Oxford Dictionary of Byzantium. Oxford and New York: Oxford University Press. p. 2006. ISBN 0-19-504652-8.
- Trapp, Erich; Beyer, Hans-Veit; Walther, Rainer; Sturm-Schnabl, Katja; Kislinger, Ewald; Leontiadis, Ioannis; Kaplaneres, Sokrates (1976–1996). Prosopographisches Lexikon der Palaiologenzeit (in German). Vienna: Verlag der Österreichischen Akademie der Wissenschaften. ISBN 3-7001-3003-1.

Catholic Church titles
Vacant Title last held by Giacomo da Itri	— TITULAR — Latin Patriarch of Constantinople; 1379/80–1384	Vacant Title next held by Angelo Correr
