= Monomachos (Byzantine family) =

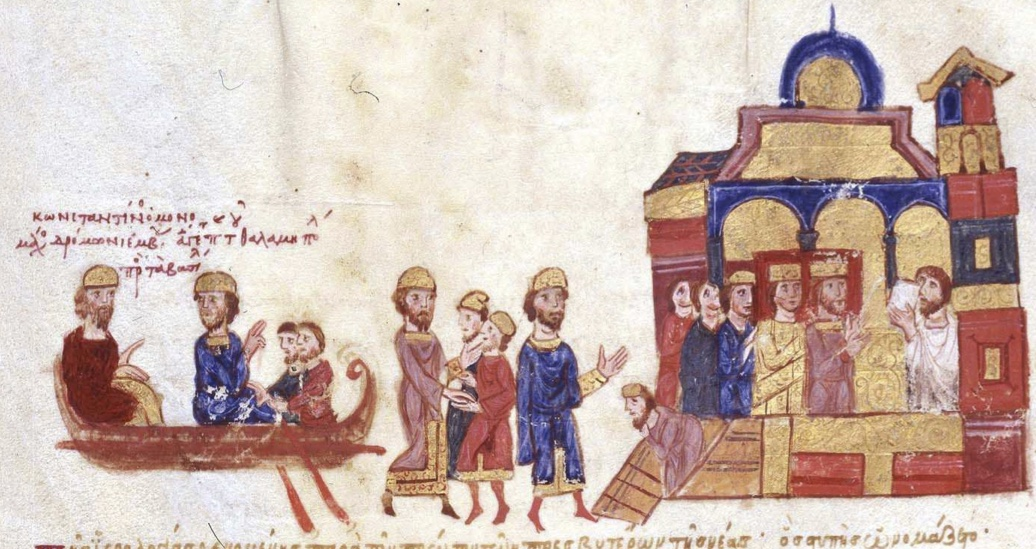
Emperor Constantine IX Monomachos arrives at Constantinople

The House of Monomachos, Latinized Monomachus (Greek: Μονομάχος, lit. 'Lone Warrior'), feminine form Monomachina (Μονομαχίνα), was the name of a Byzantine aristocratic family active in the 10th–15th centuries and possibly even before that. The name, Monomachos, means "the gladiator" in Greek. It produced several officials and military commanders, as well as one emperor, Constantine IX Monomachos (r. 1042–1055).

== History ==
The first occurrences of the name are unclear, and may refer to sobriquets rather than members of the family. An iconoclast bishop of Nicomedia with the name is alluded to in the 9th-century hagiography of St. Joannicius, whereas a fervently anti-iconoclast official was Patrikios Niketas Monomachos during the early 9th century, who was later declared a saint. The family was said to have been ‘ancient’ but did not come to the fore until the 10th and 11th centuries: firstly with Pavlos Monomachos, a wealthy merchant noble who may have married a Doukaina, followed by their son, Theodosios (born c. 970), an important bureaucrat under Basil II, and lastly, Constantine Monomachos who became emperor Constantine IX. A relative of Constantine IX married Vsevolod I of Kiev. Their son Vladimir II Monomakh adopted his mother's surname; indeed the Monomachos' legacy would flower with the famed Monomachos crown, and in imperial Russia with the legend of the Monomakh Cap, supposedly gifted by Constantine IX to his grandson, Vladimir II Monomakh.

By the late 11th century during the Komnenian period, the family had fallen into relative obscurity. The sole exception was George Monomachos, doux of Dyrrhachium under Nikephoros III Botaneiates (r. 1078–1081), but dismissed by Alexios I Komnenos (r. 1081–1118).

From the turn of the 13th century and until the loss of the region to the Turks in the early 14th century, family members are also recorded in Asia Minor, e.g. John Monomachos (fl. 1304–1324), a friend of the statesman Nikephoros Choumnos, and the general Alexios Philanthropenos. His contemporaries, the brothers George Atouemes Monomachos and Michael Senachereim Monomachos, became senior officials and generals. Among the last attested members of the family was the architect George Monomachos in Thessalonica in c. 1421.

== Sources ==
- Kazhdan, Alexander (1991). "Monomachos". In Kazhdan, Alexander (ed.). The Oxford Dictionary of Byzantium. Oxford and New York: Oxford University Press. p. 1398. ISBN 0-19-504652-8.
