= Yakub I of Germiyan =

Bey of Germiyan from c. 1300 to 1340

Yakub I
- Khan-i Germiyan; Sultan (Note: Long form: Sultan al-Germiyaniyya Chelebi al-Azam azzamallahu kadrehu)

Bey of Germiyan
- Reign: c. 1300 – c. 1340
- Successor: Mehmed Chakhshadan
- Died: c. 1340
- Issue: Mehmed Chakhshadan; Musa
- Dynasty: Germiyan
- Father: Karim al-Din Ali Shir
- Religion: Islam

Yakub I (died c. 1340) was the founder of the beylik of Germiyan, located in western Anatolia around Kütahya. Although Germiyan revolted against Mesud II (r. 1284–1297, 1303–1308), the Sultan of Rum, Yakub accepted vassalage under Kayqubad III (r. 1298–1302). The Sultanate of Rum disintegrated shortly after. At that point, Yakub's realm extended as far east as Ankara and incorporated various towns taken from the Byzantine Empire and the Catalan Company. Yakub was the suzerain of many of his neighbors, and his reign was described as economically prosperous by contemporary historians. He was succeeded by his son Mehmed, nicknamed Chakhshadan.

== Background ==
During the 11th century, much of West Asia was subject to Seljuk rule. A branch of the Seljuk dynasty formed the Sultanate of Rum, a Turkish Muslim state in Anatolia, which saw its height from the late 12th century to 1237. The Germiyan first appeared in 1239 under Kaykhusraw II's rule of the Sultanate of Rum. Muzaffar al-Din, Yakub I's paternal grandfather, was tasked with subduing Baba Ishak's rebellion in the area around Malatya. Kaykhusraw II faced a major defeat by the Mongol Empire at the Battle of Köse Dağ in 1243, which resulted in the vassalization of the Sultanate, which was forced to pay a major annual tax to the Mongols. With the division of the Mongol Empire, Anatolia came under the influence of the Ilkhanate, which was founded by Hulegu Khan (r. 1256–1265). During the chaos caused by the Anatolian campaign of the Mamluk Sultan Baibars of Egypt in 1277, Ala al-Din Siyavush, commonly known as Jimri, who was a pretender to the Seljuk legacy, revolted against the Mongols. Husam al-Din, a member of the Germiyanids, (Note: Husam al-Din was the brother of Yakub I according to İsmail Hakkı Uzunçarşılı.) fought against Jimri and Mehmed of Karaman in western Anatolia. Although Jimri and Mehmed were eliminated, the Karamanids' presence in Anatolia persisted, signaling further division in the region, which was symptomatic of the downfall of the Seljuks.

== Reign ==
The Germiyan attempted to declare independence from the Seljuk Sultanate of Rum when Mesud II became the sultan following the execution of his father, Kaykhusraw III, by the Mongols in 1283. The conflict between the Germiyanids and the Seljuks went dormant upon Mesud II's death, and Yakub agreed to become a vassal of the new ruler, Kayqubad III. At that time, Yakub's realm extended as east as Ankara. His domain included Denizli and Karahisar in western Anatolia, according to Nicephorus Gregoras, and Tripolis on the Meander, according to George Pachymeres.

The locations of towns in Anatolia.

Contemporary historian al-Umari described Yakub as the most powerful Turkish emir, being the suzerain of many of his neighbors, with the Byzantine Empire paying him 100,000 pieces of gold each year. Al-Umari further relayed the observations of travelers Haydar al-Uryan and Balaban, that Yakub's domains included about 700 settlements. He possessed 40,000 cavalry and was able to raise 200,000 troops in times of war, although historian Varlık considers this number exaggerated.

Yakub eventually conquered the regions of Simav and Kula, which were later regained by the Catalan Company. He unsuccessfully besieged Philadelphia but his force of 20,000 men was almost completely annihilated by the Catalans in April 1304 at Aulax. He besieged the city again in 1310/11 and in 1322-1324, failed to take it for a second and third time, but did force the Philadelphians to pay tribute. Yakub had hostile relations with the Ottoman Beylik, and provoked the Tatars of the Chavdar tribe near Karacahisar to attack them in 1313. After having eliminated the Hamidid and Eshrefid begs in 1325, Timurtash, the Ilkhanid governor of Anatolia, attempted to enact authority over the rulers of western Anatolia and seize the territory of Germiyan, Philadephila, Denizli, and Menteshe. Yakub's son-in-law, who was the lord of Afyonkarahisar, fled to Kütahya from Eretna, who was an officer under Timurtash tasked to capture the city. When Yakub was about to engage in a battle with Eretna, the latter was called back by Timurtash in 1327.

The region under Yakub was economically prosperous and saw an increase in literary and scientific patronage. Rumi's grandson Ulu Arif Chelebi visited the region by 1312 and maintained spiritual authority over Yakub.

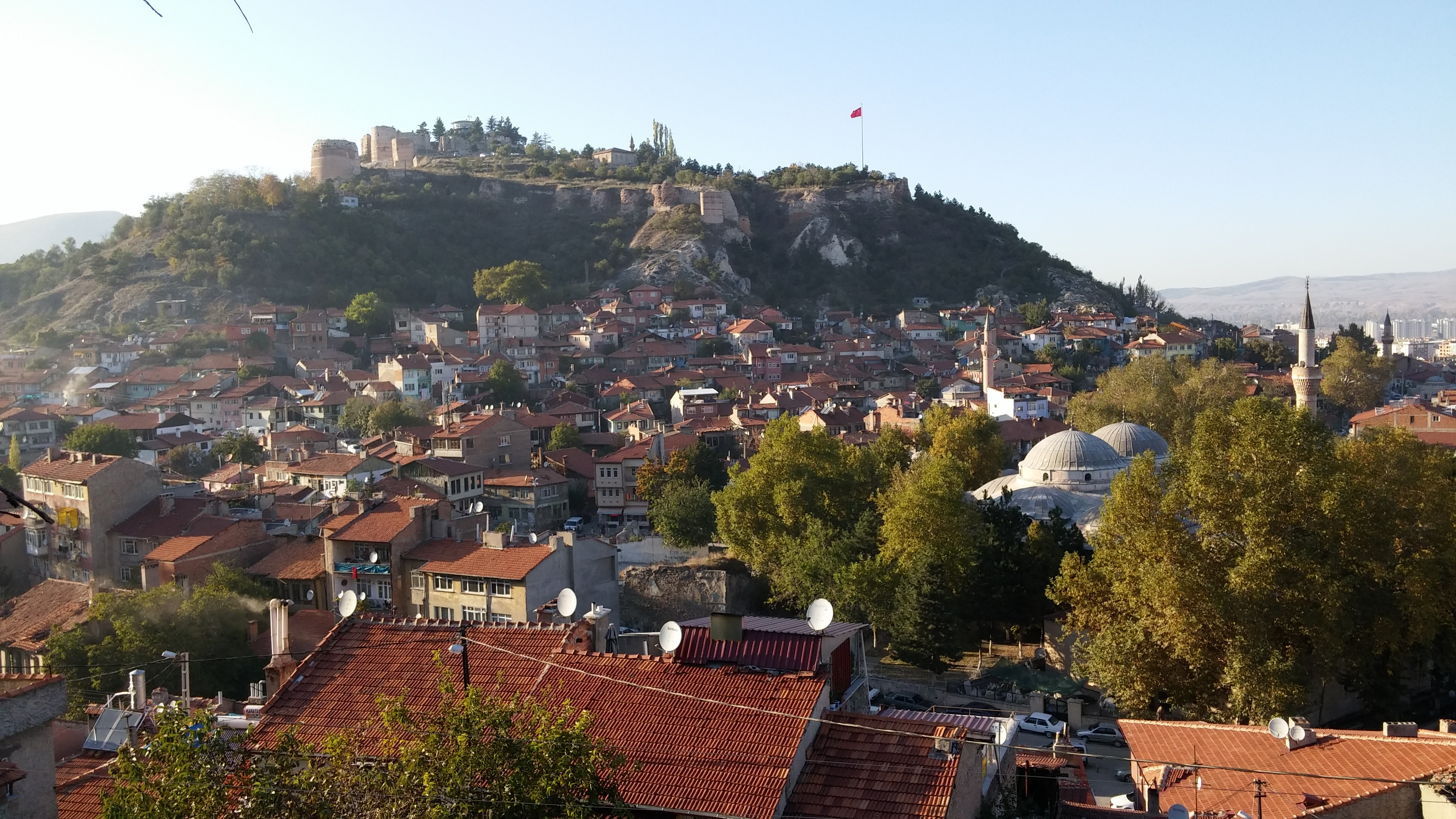
A view of Kütahya and its castle.

Yakub struck a single type of coin late into his reign. An unnamed coin minted in 1307 mentioning the title Khan-i Germiyan is identified with Yakub I. In the inscriptions of the castle of Sandıklı, which were later moved to a nearby fountain, he was referred to as Sultan al-Germiyaniyya Chelebi al-Azam azzamallahu kadrehu. Yakub owned a waqf (charitable endowment) for the mevlevihane (congregational place for the Mevlevi Order) of Karahisar. According to İsmail Hakkı Uzunçarşılı, he possibly owned another waqf at the zawiya of the village of Hacim near Uşak, which dates to 1321. However, there the owner's father was recorded as Mehmed.

Yakub is known to have exchanged letters with the Mamluk Sultanate in 1340; these are the latest known records of his life, and his exact year of death is unknown. According to the 17th-century traveler Evliya Çelebi, who wrote three centuries after Yakub's death, he was buried at the hill of Hıdırlık near Kütahya. Mehmed, nicknamed Chakhshadan, was the son and successor of Yakub.

== Family ==
Yakub's father was Karim al-Din Ali Shir, who was the son of Muzaffar al-Din Ali Shir and grandson of Ali Shir. Yakub had a brother known as Husam al-Din, and a sister, who was known to have had a son, Badr al-Din Murad. Yakub had two daughters. In addition to Mehmed, Yakub had another son named Musa according to a deed from 1363.

== In popular culture ==
In the Turkish historical fiction TV series Kuruluş: Osman, Yakup Bey was portrayed by Turkish actor Mirza Bahattin Doğan.

== Bibliography ==
- The Chronicle of Muntaner. Vol. II. Translated by Goodenough, Lady Anna Kinsky. Hakluyt Society. 1921.
- Juan López, Juan Bautista (2024). Manuel Gabalas: Biography, Intellectual Network, Works and Thought (PDF) (PhD thesis). Department of Medieval Studies of the Central European University Private University, Vienna.
- Foss, Clive (2022). The Beginnings of the Ottoman Empire. Oxford Studies in Byzantium. Oxford University Press. ISBN 978-0-19-886543-8.
- Mélikoff, I. (1965). "Germiyān-Og̲h̲ullari̊̊". In Lewis, B.; Pellat, Ch. & Schacht, J. (eds.). The Encyclopaedia of Islam, Second Edition. Volume II: C–G. Leiden: E. J. Brill. OCLC 495469475.
- Nicol, Donald M. (1993) [1972]. The Last Centuries of Byzantium, 1261–1453 (Second ed.). Cambridge: Cambridge University Press. ISBN 978-0-521-43991-6.
- Peacock, Andrew Christian Spencer (2000). "Saljuqs iii. Saljuqs of Rum". In Yarshater, Ehsan (ed.). Encyclopædia Iranica (Online ed.). Encyclopædia Iranica Foundation.
- Uzunçarşılı, İsmail Hakkı (1969). Anadolu Beylikleri Ve Akkoyunlu, Karakoyunlu Devletleri [Anatolian Beyliks and Aq Qoyunlu, Qara Qoyunlu States] (in Turkish). Turkish Historical Society Press. ISBN 9751624576. OCLC 563553149.
- Varlık, Mustafa Çetin (1996). "Germiyanoğulları". TDV Encyclopedia of Islam, Vol. 14 (Geli̇bolu – Haddesenâ) (in Turkish). Istanbul: Presidency of Religious Affairs, Centre for Islamic Studies. pp. 33–35. ISBN 978-975-389-441-8.
- Varlık, Mustafa Çetin (2013). "Yâkub Bey". TDV Encyclopedia of Islam, Vol. 43 (Vekâlet – Yûsî) (in Turkish). Istanbul: Presidency of Religious Affairs, Centre for Islamic Studies. pp. 278–279. ISBN 978-975-389-754-9.
