= Alexios Philanthropenos =

Byzantine nobleman

Alexios Doukas Philanthropenos
- Ἀλέξιος Δούκας Φιλανθρωπηνός

Doux of the Thracesian theme
- In office 1290s–1295
- Monarch: Andronikos II Palaiologos

Governor of Philadelphia
- In office 1324–1327
- Monarch: Andronikos II Palaiologos
- Preceded by: Manuel Tagaris

Governor of Lesbos
- In office 1327–1328
- Monarch: Andronikos II Palaiologos

Governor of Lesbos
- In office 1336–1340s
- Monarch: Andronikos III Palaiologos

Personal details
- Born: c. 1270
- Died: 1340s possibly Lesbos
- Spouse: Theodora Akropolitissa
- Children: Michael Philanthropenos

Military service
- Allegiance: Byzantine Empire
- Years of service: ca. 1293–1295, 1324–1340s
- Battles/wars: Meander campaigns of Alexios Philanthropenos; Third Siege of Philadelphia

Alexios Doukas Philanthropenos (Greek: Ἀλέξιος Δούκας Φιλανθρωπηνός) was a Byzantine nobleman and notable general of the Byzantine Empire. A relative of the ruling Palaiologos dynasty, he was appointed commander-in-chief in Asia Minor in 1293 and for a time re-established the Byzantine position there, scoring some of the last Byzantine successes against the Turkish beyliks. In 1295 he rose up in revolt against Andronikos II Palaiologos, but was betrayed and blinded. Nothing is known of him until 1323, when he was pardoned by Andronikos II and sent again against the Turks, relieving a siege of Philadelphia, allegedly by his mere appearance. He was then named briefly governor of Lesbos in 1328, and again in 1336, when he recovered the island's capital from Latin occupation. He ruled the island thereafter, probably until his death in the 1340s.

== Biography ==
=== Early life and family ===
Alexios was born c. 1270 as the second son of prōtovestiarios and megas domestikos Michael Tarchaneiotes. His mother, Maria, belonged to the noble family of the Philanthropenoi, which rose to prominence in the latter half of the 13th century. She was the daughter of prōtostratōr and megas doux Alexios Doukas Philanthropenos, after whom Alexios was named. On his father's side, Alexios was also closely related to the imperial family of the Palaiologoi, through his grandmother, Martha Palaiologina, a sister of Emperor Michael VIII Palaiologos (r. 1259–1261). Alexios married Theodora Akropolitissa, daughter of Constantine Akropolites and granddaughter of the historian George Akropolites. They had one child, Michael Philanthropenos, who also became a general.

=== First command in Asia Minor and uprising ===
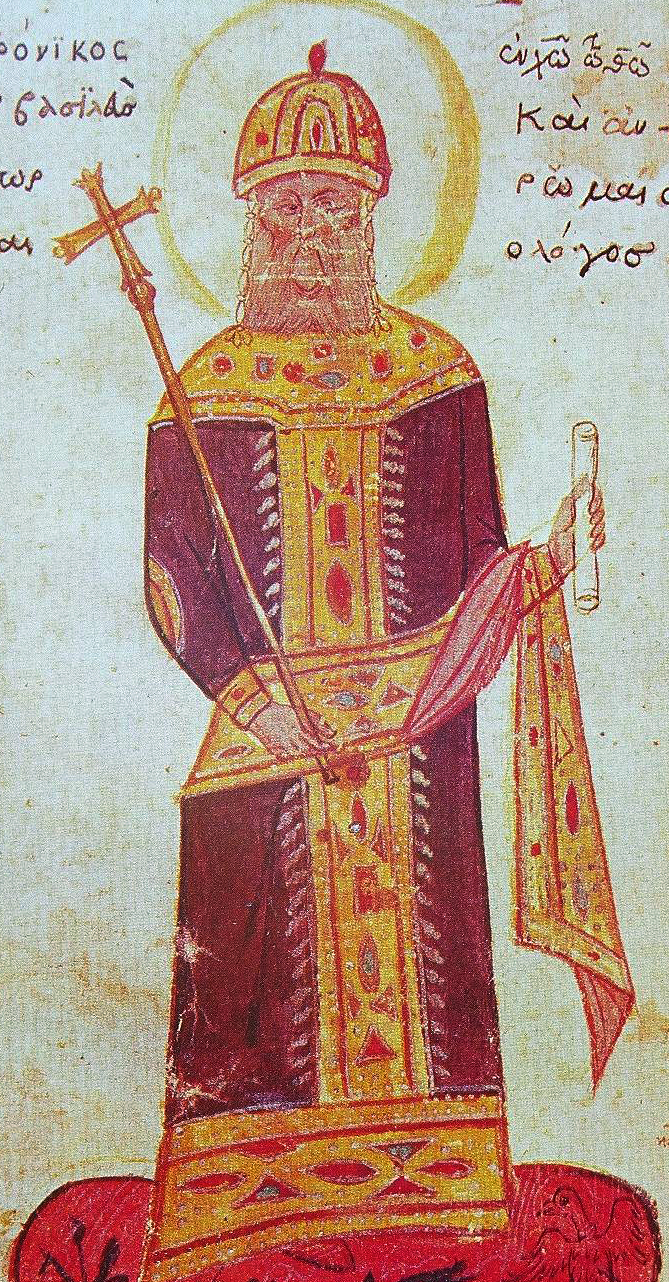
Miniature portrait of Andronikos II Palaiologos

Alexios's uncle, Emperor Andronikos II Palaiologos (r. 1282–1328), took an active interest in the defence of the Anatolian possessions of the Byzantine Empire against the encroaching Turkic emirates in the early 1290s: hoping to re-establish the akritai, he settled refugees from Venetian-held Crete in military colonies along the border and appointed Alexios as doux of the Thracesian theme, awarding him the high court title of pinkernēs.

Alexios commanded all of the Byzantine possessions in Asia, except for the Ionian coast, but his main area of responsibility was the interior of the old Thracesian Theme, which comprised the southeastern parts of Byzantine Anatolia. A certain Libadarios deputized for him in the northern provinces (Neokastra). During the next two years, Alexios achieved several victories: he defeated the Turks of Mysia at Achyraous and forced them to recognize Byzantine rule, and then moved south. Based at Nymphaion, he scoured the valley of the Maeander river, managing to stop the Turkish raids and advance into the Emirate of Menteshe, recapturing the fortress of Melanoudion, the town of Hieron, and rid Miletus of the payment of tribute to the Turks. Many Turks, fleeing from Mongol pressure, joined his army, and so many prisoners were made during his campaigns, that the monk and scholar Maximus Planudes, a friend of Alexios, wrote that "a sheep was more expensive to buy than a Muslim prisoner". His successes made him popular with the locals, who reportedly began suggesting that he should make himself emperor. Philanthropenos at first refused to heed them and even asked Andronikos to transfer him away from Anatolia, but in vain. In mid-1294, Philanthropenos was ordered by the emperor to transfer the region of Lydia to Libadarios's control. In summer 1295, while Philanthropenos was at Tralleis, a Turkish general named Karman used the opportunity to launch an attack on Priene, but was beaten back with heavy losses, and Philanthropenos's troops recovered Hieron.

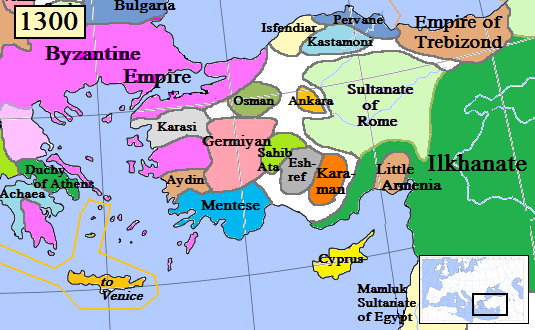
Map of Asia Minor ca. 1300, showing the Turkish encroachment on Byzantine territory following Philanthropenos' departure

At this point, in the autumn of 1295, Alexios rose up against Andronikos. The exact circumstances and reasons for this move remain obscure, but the revolt was fuelled by the discontent of the Asian provinces over high taxation and what many perceived as the neglect of the defence of Asia by the Palaiologoi. His rebellion certainly had the support of the people, as George Pachymeres recounts that:

"in the monasteries [...], the name of the Emperor was no longer commemorated, but only that of Philanthropenos."

At Ephesus Alexios seized Theodore Palaiologos, the Emperor's brother, but failed to gain the support of all provincial governors; Libadarios, most notably, who was also Theodore's father-in-law, remained loyal to Andronikos. Negotiations began, with Andronikos offering Alexios the title of Caesar to lull him into a false sense of security, while he prepared to get rid of him. Around Christmas, Libadarios persuaded some Cretan soldiers to seize Alexios and had him blinded, the punishment usually meted out to rebels.

=== Rehabilitation and rescue of Philadelphia ===
Alexios was replaced as commander by John Tarchaneiotes, first cousin of Andronikos II, and disappeared from the scene for 30 years. His successors proved greatly inferior, and by 1323, Byzantine possessions in Asia had been greatly reduced. At that point, Patriarch Jesaias urged Andronikos to recall the aged general. A desperate Andronikos agreed and pardoned Alexios in 1324. Alexios was tasked with relieving the isolated exclave of Philadelphia, which had been long under siege and was ready to fall. He was given no army, but, according to the Byzantine chroniclers, the mere news of Alexios's approach, and the respect in which the Turks held him, was enough for the siege to be lifted. Alexios was appointed governor of the city, a position he retained until 1327.

=== Governor of Lesbos ===
Philanthropenos remained at Philadelphia until 1326, possibly also 1327, but it appears that he was then appointed as governor of the strategically important Byzantine island of Lesbos, since he was dismissed from the same post in 1328 by Andronikos III Palaiologos.

In 1335, Lesbos was seized by a Latin army under the Genoese Lord of Phocaea, Domenico Cattaneo, and Andronikos III raised a fleet of 83 ships to recover the island, which arrived in June 1336. The fleet disembarked an army, led by Alexios Philanthropenos, which swiftly secured the entire island except for the capital, Mytilene. Philanthropenos countered the strong garrison of 500 Latin mercenaries by inducing them, group by group, to come over to him. The siege lasted until November, when Domenico capitulated, returning Lesbos and Phocaea to the Empire. In the next year, Philanthropenos was able to thwart a Turkish attack on the island by bribing the Turks. Exuberantly praised by contemporaries like Nikephoros Gregoras as the "Belisarius of the Palaiologan era", Alexios Philanthropenos was left by Andronikos III as governor of the island, where he lived until his death, which occurred probably in the 1340s.

== In popular culture ==
The 2020 novel "The usurper" by Emanuele Rizzardi focuses on the beginning of Alexios Philanthropenos' campaigns.

== Bibliography ==
- Angelov, Dimiter (2007). Imperial Ideology and Political Thought in Byzantium (1204-1330). Cambridge, United Kingdom: Cambridge University Press. ISBN 978-0-521-85703-1.
- Bartusis, Mark C. (1997). The Late Byzantine Army: Arms and Society 1204–1453. Philadelphia, Pennsylvania: University of Pennsylvania Press. ISBN 0-8122-1620-2.
- Juan López, Juan Bautista (2024). Manuel Gabalas: Biography, Intellectual Network, Works and Thought (PDF) (PhD thesis). Department of Medieval Studies of the Central European University Private University, Vienna.
- Kazhdan, Alexander, ed. (1991). The Oxford Dictionary of Byzantium. Oxford and New York: Oxford University Press. ISBN 0-19-504652-8.
- Nicol, Donald M. (1993) [1972]. The Last Centuries of Byzantium, 1261–1453 (Second ed.). Cambridge: Cambridge University Press. ISBN 978-0-521-43991-6.
- Radivoj, Radic (16 September 2003). "Alexios Philanthropenos". Encyclopedia of the Hellenic World, Asia Minor. Athens, Greece: Foundation of the Hellenic World. Archived from the original on 27 February 2012.
- Trapp, Erich; Beyer, Hans-Veit; Walther, Rainer; Sturm-Schnabl, Katja; Kislinger, Ewald; Leontiadis, Ioannis; Kaplaneres, Sokrates (1976–1996). Prosopographisches Lexikon der Palaiologenzeit (in German). Vienna: Verlag der Österreichischen Akademie der Wissenschaften. ISBN 3-7001-3003-1.
