= John Tarchaneiotes =

Byzantine aristocrat and general

- Ἰωάννης Ταρχανειώτης
- Born: before 1259
- Died: after 1304
- Military career
- Allegiance: Byzantine Empire
- Service years: 1260s, 1298–1300
- Conflicts: Wars against the Anatolian beyliks

John Tarchaneiotes (Greek: Ἰωάννης Ταρχανειώτης, romanized: Iōannēs Tarchaneiōtēs; fl. 1259–1304) was a Byzantine aristocrat and general under Emperor Andronikos II Palaiologos (r. 1282–1328). Although related by blood to the Palaiologos dynasty, he became notable as one of the main leaders of the "Arsenites", the supporters of the deposed Patriarch of Constantinople Arsenios Autoreianos, who challenged the dynasty's legitimacy. A capable soldier, he was released from prison in 1298 to take command against the Turks in Asia Minor. His administrative reforms and integrity shored up the Byzantine position, but aroused the ire of the local magnates, who forced him to abandon the province.

== Biography ==
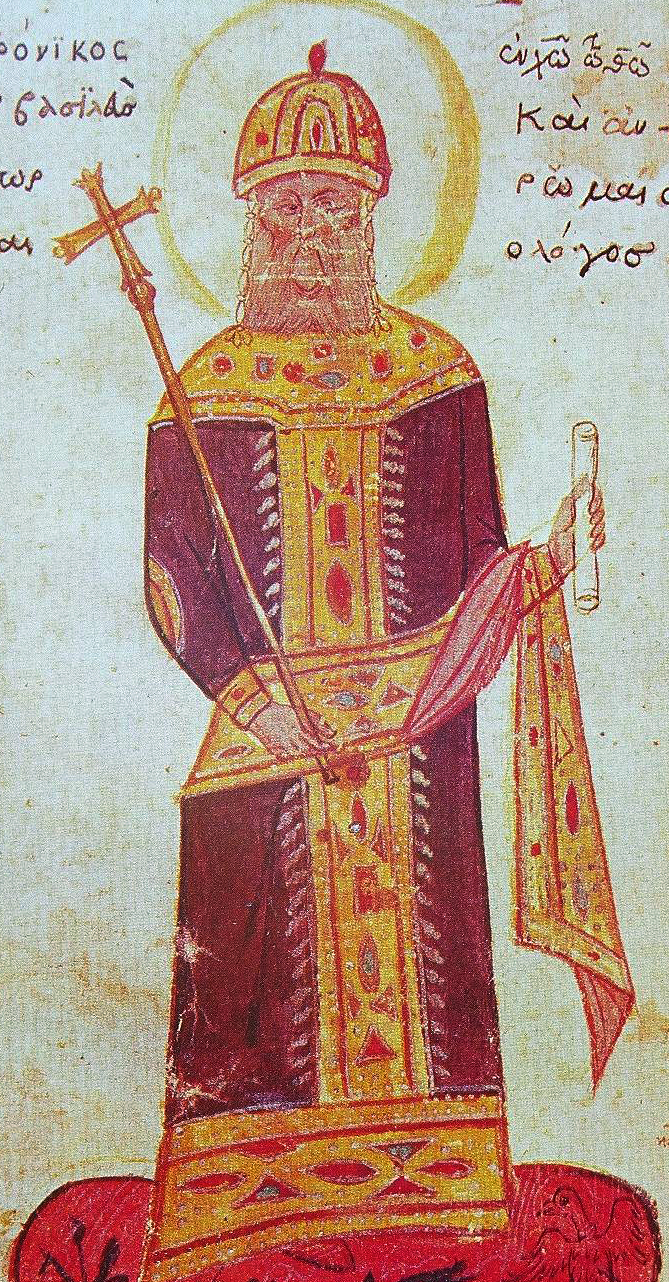
Miniature portrait of Andronikos II Palaiologos

John Tarchaneiotes hailed from a distinguished family: his father, Nikephoros Tarchaneiotes, had served as megas domestikos (commander-in-chief of the army) under the Nicaean emperor John III Doukas Vatatzes (r. 1221–1254) and had married Maria-Martha, the sister of Andronikos II's father, Michael VIII Palaiologos (r. 1259–1282), whom he had supported in his rise to the throne. Following the coronation of Michael VIII, John and his brothers had lived in the imperial palace. Tarchaneiotes distinguished himself early on as a soldier, fighting under his uncle, the despotes John Palaiologos, in the 1262 campaign against Michael II Komnenos Doukas, the ruler of Epirus.

Nevertheless, Tarchaneiotes soon came to oppose the Palaiologoi, and by 1266 he had emerged one of the leaders of the Arsenites, the supporters of the former Patriarch of Constantinople Arsenios Autoreianos, who had excommunicated Michael VIII for usurping the rights and the blinding of his predecessor, John IV Laskaris (r. 1258–1261). The Arsenites refused to recognize the Patriarch's subsequent deposition by the Emperor, and were savagely persecuted. They ipso facto refused to recognize the validity of Andronikos' claim to the throne as well, whom they regarded as "the son of the excommunicated usurper" (Nicol), and who had been crowned by an "illegitimate" patriarch, the anti-Arsenite Joseph I Galesiotes. After the failure of Andronikos' attempt at reconciliation with the Arsenites in the synod of Adramyttion in 1284, John Tarchaneiotes became the leader of the radical faction, while the moderates followed a monk, Hyakinthos. Consequently, Tarchaneiotes spent long periods in exile or in prison. He was banished to Chele in 1289, then placed under house arrest in Constantinople. Released c. 1296, he was arrested again in 1297 and thrown in the palace prison.

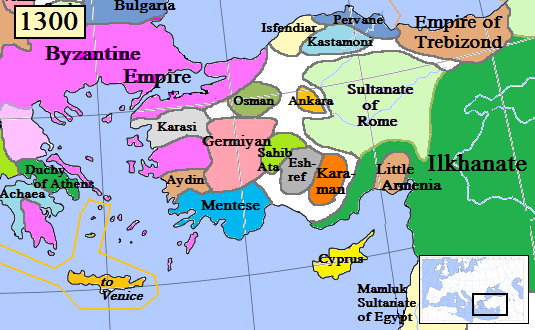
Map of Asia Minor c. 1300, showing the Turkish encroachment on Byzantine territory at the time of Tarchneiotes' governorship

Nevertheless, in 1298, Andronikos was in need of his cousin's military talent in Asia Minor, where the Turks of Menteshe were encroaching once more on Byzantine territory after having been beaten back in 1293–1295 by Alexios Philanthropenos. Philanthropenos had ended up rising in revolt, supported by the local populace which still largely cherished the memory of the Laskarids of Nicaea and resented the Palaiologoi; to prevent Tarchaneiotes, an avowed Arsenite, from following the same path as his predecessor, Andronikos first extracted from him a personal oath of loyalty and then appointed him commander in the southern and most endangered sector of the front, along the Maeander River. There Tarchaneiotes achieved swift success, not only in the field, but most importantly in reorganizing the local administration and ending corruption which had allowed the alienation of the pronoia estates, originally intended for the upkeep of the army, from their rightful holders. Tarchaneiotes seems to have engaged in a reassessment and redistribution of these lands, which was so successful that it resulted not only in an increase in the numbers of his army, but also in the equipment of a small squadron of ships.

Despite his success, Tarchaneiotes was resented by the local magnates, who had mostly profited from the previous situation and were most affected from his reforms and his honest administration, as well as by the anti-Arsenite establishment of the Church. In the end, some of the pronoia holders, who were deprived of land through John's reforms, approached the anti-Arsenite bishop of Philadelphia and accused Tarchaneiotes of plotting a revolt.

But the Patriarch never approved of his appointment because of his Arsenite past; and some of his own officers, who objected to a general who was unusually honest in financial affairs, made use of the Patriarch’s disapproval to denounce Tarchaniotes to Theoleptos, Bishop of Philadelphia. A charge of treason was trumped up against him and he fled to the Emperor who was then in Thessalonica.

Apparently Tarchaneiotes was imprisoned again, for he is last recorded as being released again from prison in 1304. Following his flight, the situation in Asia Minor deteriorated rapidly as his reforms were abandoned and reversed, and the army's pay was diverted into the pockets of the local elites. Consequently, within a short time the Byzantine army disintegrated, especially as the numerous mercenaries deserted it for want of pay, opening the path for the complete collapse of Byzantine authority in Asia Minor over the next decade.

== Sources ==
- Bartusis, Mark C. (1997). The Late Byzantine Army: Arms and Society 1204–1453. Philadelphia, PA: University of Pennsylvania Press. ISBN 0-8122-1620-2.
- Kazhdan, Alexander, ed. (1991). The Oxford Dictionary of Byzantium. Oxford and New York: Oxford University Press. ISBN 0-19-504652-8.
- Nicol, Donald M. (1993) [1972]. The Last Centuries of Byzantium, 1261–1453 (Second ed.). Cambridge: Cambridge University Press. ISBN 978-0-521-43991-6.
- Trapp, Erich; Beyer, Hans-Veit; Kaplaneres, Sokrates; Leontiadis, Ioannis (1991). Prosopographisches Lexikon der Palaiologenzeit (in German). Vol. 11. Vienna: Verlag der Österreichischen Akademie der Wissenschaften. ISBN 3-7001-3003-1.
