= Philanthropenos =

The House of Philanthropenos (Greek: Φιλανθρωπηνός), feminine form Philanthropene (Φιλανθρωπηνή), was the name of a noble Byzantine Greek family which appeared in the mid-13th century and produced a number of high-ranking generals and officials until the end of the Byzantine Empire. Their name derives from the monastery of Christ Philanthropos ("Christ Friend of Man") in Constantinople. Some members of the family use the composite surname Doukas Philanthropenos, and may, according to Demetrios I. Polemis, constitute a distinct branch of the family.

== History ==
The first known member of the family is Alexios Doukas Philanthropenos, first attested circa 1255 as a commander at Ohrid. He is usually equated with the distinguished admiral of the same name, who rose to the rank of protostrator and eventually megas doux. He died circa 1275. His daughter, Maria, married Michael Tarchaneiotes. Their second son was the pinkernes Alexios Philanthropenos, a general celebrated for his successes against the Turks, who rose up unsuccessfully against Andronikos II Palaiologos in 1295. He was pardoned in the 1320s and was again active in the field until 1334. A Michael Doukas Philanthropenos, epi tes trapezes and uncle of Andronikos II, is attested from 1286 to 1304, when he was sent to defend Magnesia from the Turks. A number of Philanthropenos women are known only from short references: Theodora Doukaina Philanthropene married John Komnenos Akropolites, perhaps a son of the historian George Akropolites; Irene Komnene Doukaina Philanthropene Kantakouzene, who died on 8 August 1292; and Eirene Komnene Philanthropene Doukaina, who died on 7 September 1303. Others are known only by their surname.

In the 14th century, a John Philanthropenos, megas droungarios tou ploimou, is attested in a synodal decision of 1324, George Doukas Philanthropenos, megas hetaireiarches and governor of Lemnos, is attested in 1346, and the megas stratopedarches Michael Philanthropenos, a cousin of John V Palaiologos, is attested in 1350. In Thessaly, Alexios Angelos Philanthropenos and Manuel Angelos Philanthropenos are attested in the 1380s and 1390s. Alexios ruled Thessaly with the title of Caesar from circa 1382 to 1389, and was succeeded by Manuel (either his son or his brother), who ruled until the Ottoman conquest in 1393/1394.

In the 15th century, the two most prominent members of the family are George Doukas Philanthropenos, mesazon to John VIII Palaiologos, and Alexios Laskaris Philanthropenos, megas stratopedarches, governor of Patras in 1445 and a friend of Bessarion.

== Sources ==
- Guilland, Rodolphe (1967). Recherches sur les Institutions Byzantines, Tomes I–II (in French). Berlin: Akademie-Verlag.
- Kazhdan, Alexander, ed. (1991). The Oxford Dictionary of Byzantium. Oxford and New York: Oxford University Press. ISBN 0-19-504652-8.
- Polemis, Demetrios I. (1968). The Doukai: A Contribution to Byzantine Prosopography. London: The Athlone Press.
