= George Choumnos =

George Choumnos (Greek: Γεώργιος Χοῦμνος, died after 1342) was a Byzantine statesman.

== Biography ==
George Choumnos was a younger son of the scholar and statesman Nikephoros Choumnos, and brother of the general and statesman John Choumnos. According to Rodolphe Guilland, he is possibly to be identified with the otherwise unknown megas stratopedarches Choumnos, attested in 1328. At that time, during the final stages of the Byzantine civil war of 1321–1328, he was the governor of Thessalonica and defended the city unsuccessfully against the forces of Andronikos III Palaiologos. He appears again in the late reign of Andronikos III, from 1337 on, holding the position of epi tes trapezes (head of the imperial table). He was evidently an influential person: his unnamed son had family ties to Andronikos III, and George himself is attested as speaking first in imperial councils, even before Andronikos III's close friend and aide, the megas domestikos John Kantakouzenos. In 1339, he is also attested as head (kephalatikeuon) of one of the districts of Constantinople.

In the civil war of 1341–1347 he remained loyal to Andronikos III's under-age son, John V Palaiologos, and opposed Kantakouzenos; as a reward, he was raised to the post of megas stratopedarches on the occasion of John V's coronation on 19 November 1341. One of his nieces even became the second wife of one of the chief leaders of John V's regency council, Alexios Apokaukos, but in late 1342 Choumnos fell out with Apokaukos when he pleaded in favour of making peace with Kantakouzenos, and was placed under house arrest. He is possibly to be identified with a monk named Gerasimos Choumnos, which would indicate that at some point soon after he was forced to retire to a monastery.

== Sources ==
- Guilland, Rodolphe (1967). Recherches sur les institutions byzantines [Studies on the Byzantine Institutions]. Berliner byzantinische Arbeiten 35 (in French). Vol. I. Berlin and Amsterdam: Akademie-Verlag & Adolf M. Hakkert. OCLC 878894516.
- Kazhdan, Alexander (1991). "Choumnos". In Kazhdan, Alexander (ed.). The Oxford Dictionary of Byzantium. Oxford and New York: Oxford University Press. p. 433. ISBN 0-19-504652-8.
- Trapp, Erich; Beyer, Hans-Veit; Kaplaneres, Sokrates; Leontiadis, Ioannis (1994). "30945. Χοῦμνος, Γεώργιος". Prosopographisches Lexikon der Palaiologenzeit (in German). Vol. 12. Vienna: Verlag der Österreichischen Akademie der Wissenschaften. ISBN 3-7001-3003-1.
