= Petraliphas =

Byzantine noble family

- Founder: Peter

The Petraliphas (Greek: Πετραλ[ε]ίφας, feminine form Petraliphaina, Πετραλίφαινα) was a Byzantine noble family that became prominent in the late 12th– and first half of the 13th century.

== History ==
The family's ancestor was Peter, a Norman possibly from Alifa, who first came to the Byzantine Empire during the Norman invasion of Robert Guiscard, but later entered the service of Emperor Alexios I Komnenos (r. 1081–1118). The earliest member of the family recorded was Alexios Petraliphas, according to John Kinnamos a general in charge of a military force sent by Emperor Manuel I Komnenos (r. 1143–80) to his subject Kilij Arslan II, Sultan of Rûm. According to The Byzantine Family of Raoul-Ral(l)es (1973) by Sterios Fassoulakis, Alexios Petraliphas married Anna Raoul, a daughter of John Roger Dalassenos (Raoul) and Maria Komnene. However, Kinnamos records that Anna was a daughter of John II Komnenos (r. 1118–43) and Piroska of Hungary. A son of Alexios Petraliphas and Anna Raoul reportedly married Helena of Bohemia. Helena was a daughter of Frederick of Bohemia and Elizabeth of Hungary; Elizabeth was a daughter of Géza II of Hungary and his wife, Euphrosyne of Kiev.

During the reign of Manuel I Komnenos, alongside Alexios, a Nikephoros Petraliphas is recorded as a distinguished general. Although the relation between them is unknown, perhaps they were among the four Petraliphas brothers from Didymoteichon recorded by Niketas Choniates. A Theodora Antiochitissa Petraliphaina is mentioned on a seal dated to c. 1200. Antiochitissa means "woman from Antioch".

The family became prominent in the late 12th and the first half of the 13th century: the sebastokrator John Petraliphas was governor of Thessaly and Macedonia, and played a leading role in the deposition of Isaac II Angelos (r. 1185–1195 and 1203–1204) in 1195. Another sebastokrator Nikephoros Komnenos Petraliphas is also attested circa 1200. The sebastokrator John's sister Maria Petraliphaina married the ruler of Epirus and Thessalonica Theodore Komnenos Doukas (r. 1215–1230), while John's daughter Theodora Petraliphaina married Michael II Komnenos Doukas (r. 1231–1266/1268). John's son Theodore was married to a daughter of Demetrios Tornikes, one of the leading ministers of John III Vatatzes (r. 1221–1254), and played a prominent role in the Nicaean-Epirote conflicts of the 1250s, first defecting to Nicaea and then back to his brother-in-law. A marriage to Alexios Slav, a vassal of the Latin emperor Henry of Flanders (r. 1206–1216) by an unidentified Petraliphaina, possibly John's other daughter Maria, is also reported by George Akropolites. A different branch of the family is attested in the Empire of Nicaea, where another John was megas chartoularios and military commander in the late 1230s.

== Sources ==
- Kazhdan, Alexander, ed. (1991). The Oxford Dictionary of Byzantium. Oxford and New York: Oxford University Press. ISBN 0-19-504652-8.
- Kinnamos, John (1976). Deeds of John and Manuel Comnenus. Translated by Brand, Charles M. New York: Columbia University Press. ISBN 0-231-04080-6.
- Macrides, Ruth (2007). George Akropolites: The History – Introduction, Translation and Commentary. Oxford, UK: Oxford University Press. ISBN 978-0-19-921067-1.
- Skoulatos, Basile (1980). Les personnages byzantins de l'Alexiade: Analyse prosopographique et synthèse [The Byzantine Personalities of the Alexiad: Prosopographical Analysis and Synthesis] (in French). Louvain-la-Neuve and Louvain: Bureau du Recueil Collège Érasme and Éditions Nauwelaerts.
