= Metropolis of Philadelphia =

Ecclesiastical territory in Asia Minor

The Metropolis of Philadelphia (Greek: Μητρόπολη Φιλαδελφείας) was an ecclesiastical territory (diocese) of the Ecumenical Patriarchate of Constantinople in western Asia Minor, modern Turkey. Christianity in the city of Philadelphia was introduced before the middle of the 1st century AD. Today the Metropolis of Philadelphia is the see of a titular Orthodox metropolitan.

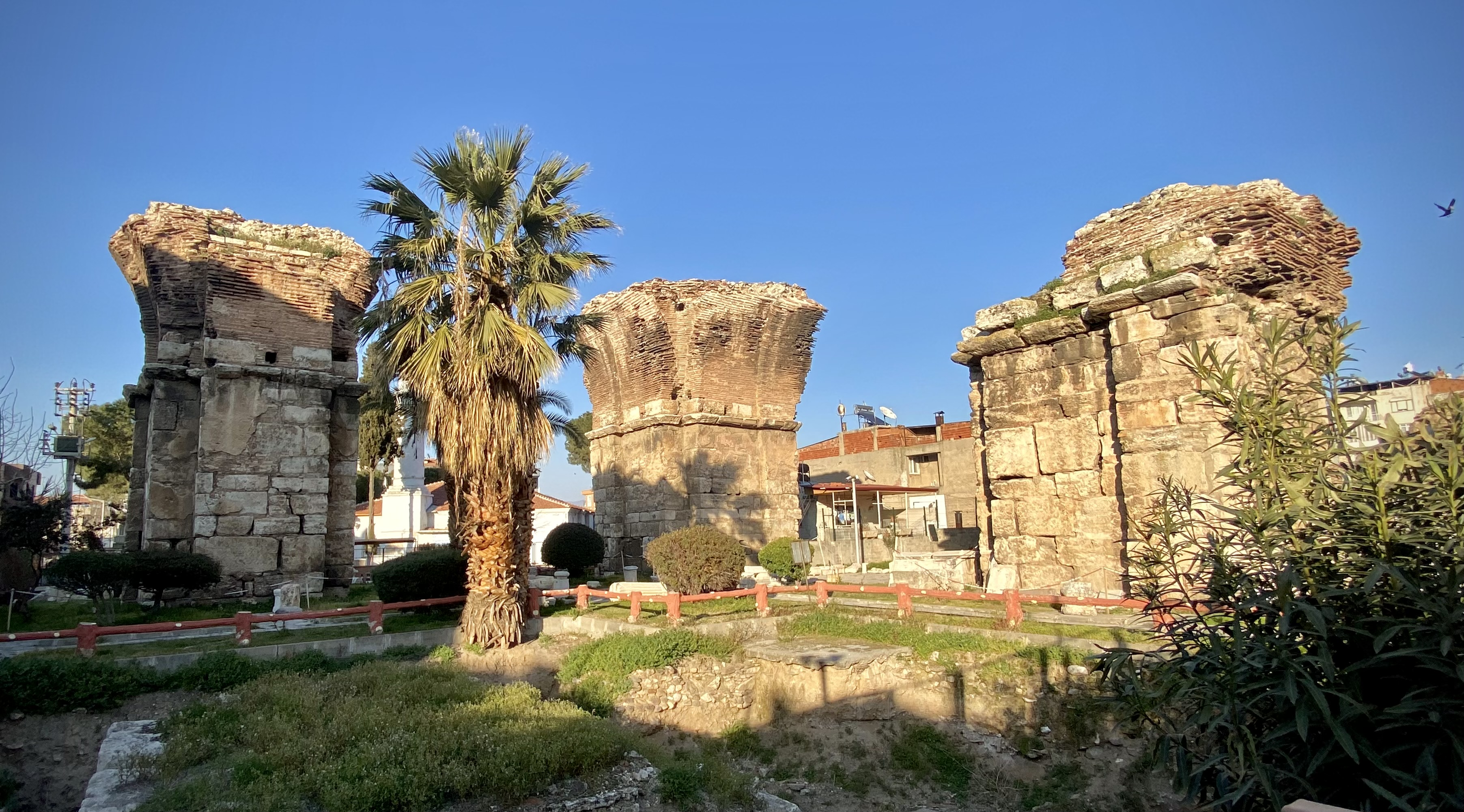
Ruins of the Church of Saint John of Philadelphia

== Early Christianity and Byzantine era ==
Philadelphia (modern Alaşehir) was one of the oldest dioceses of Asia Minor, established during the 1st century AD. It was one of the Seven Churches of Asia mentioned in the New Testament Book of Revelation, by John the Apostle.

From 325 AD it was the see of a bishop under the jurisdiction of the metropolitan of Sardis. The bishopric of Philadelphia was promoted to metropolis in ca. 1190, during the reign of Byzantine Emperor Isaac II Angelos (1185–1195).

As a result of the gradual Turkish conquest of western Anatolia during the 14th century, the Christian population decreased dramatically and consequently several bishoprics and metropolises became inactive. Philadelphia however managed to avoid the fate of the rest of the Byzantine domains in the region, and remained an isolated Byzantine exclave surrounded by various Turkish states. At that time the local metropolitans played an essential role in the city's affairs, as exemplified by the metropolitan and scholar Theoleptos (1293 – before 1326), who was also in charge of the defence of Philadelphia when it was besieged by the Turks in 1310: he was considered by contemporary chroniclers as the "savior of the city". In 1382 the local metropolis was expanded and incorporated parts of the former metropolis of Lydia. In 1385, metropolitanate of Philadelphia assumed the diocese of Hierapolis and Synnada.

== Ottoman era ==
Greek-Orthodox metropolises in Asia Minor, ca. 1880.

In 1390 the city fell to the Ottomans. In May 1394, a new metropolitan was appointed and the area of the local metropolis was further expanded over the nearby regions of Koula, Kolis and Synnada again. The sacking of the city by the army of Timur in 1402 resulted in a substantial decline of the local Christian element. However, the latter did not disappear and the city remained the seat of a metropolitan. However, probably due to the further decrease of the Christian population, the local metropolis eventually became inactive, and in 1577 the see was transferred to Venice and the title of the metropolitan of Philadelphia was used by the prelate of the Greek Orthodox community of the city until 1712.

At the beginning of the 18th century, with the demographic and financial revival of the Orthodox communities in Anatolia, new prelates were sent to Philadelphia, and in 1725 the metropolis of Philadelphia was re-established. The increase of the Christian population continued until the 19th century. Accordıng to Greek estimates, published in 1905, the metropolis of Philadelphia included 19 Orthodox communities, most of them Turkish-speaking Christians, consisting of 14,003 people, 25 parishes and 23 priests. The most numerous and active communities, apart from the one found in the city of Philadelphia itself, were in Kula region, Uşak, Denizli, Salihli and Afyon Karahisar.

Most of the metropolis became part of the Greek-controlled Smyrna Occupation Zone in 1919. However, due to the developments of the Greco-Turkish War of 1919–1922, the local Orthodox element evacuated the region entirely in the Greek-Turkish population exchange of 1923. From 1990, the titular metropolitan of Philadelphia, appointed by the Ecumenical Patriarchate of Constantinople, is Meliton Karras.

== Known Bishops ==
- Hetimasius, present at the Council of Nicæa (325);
- Cyriacus (at the Council of Philippopolis, 344)
- Theodosius (deposed at the Council of Seleucia, 359)
- Theophanes (at the First Council of Ephesus, 431)
- John (at the Third Council of Constantinople, 680)
- Stephanus at Nicæa (787)
- Michael under Leo the Armenian;
- Theoleptus of Philadelphia (1283–1322): led defense of the city against Turkish attack in 1310; writings include religious poetry, monastic treatises, anti-Arsenite writings, letters
- Macarius Chrysocephalas (1336–82): candidate for patriarchate in 1353, wrote Rhodonia (anthology of proverbs and gnomai), catenae (“chains,” quotations from theologians attached to Bible verses) on Matthew and Luke, homilies, and a vita of St. Meletios of Galesios
- Gabrius Severus (1577), wrote works against the Latins
- Gerasimus Blachus (1679), author of numerous works
- Meletius Typaldus (1685), deposed for becoming a Catholic

...

- Saint Prokopios Lazaridis, (1906-1911)
- Chrysostomos, (1913-1921)

== Sources ==
- Kiminas, Demetrius (2009). The Ecumenical Patriarchate. Wildside Press LLC. ISBN 9781434458766.
- Moustakas, Konstantinos (2002). "Diocese of Philadelpheia". Encyclopaedia of the Hellenic World, Asia Minor.
