= Alaşehir =

- District and municipality
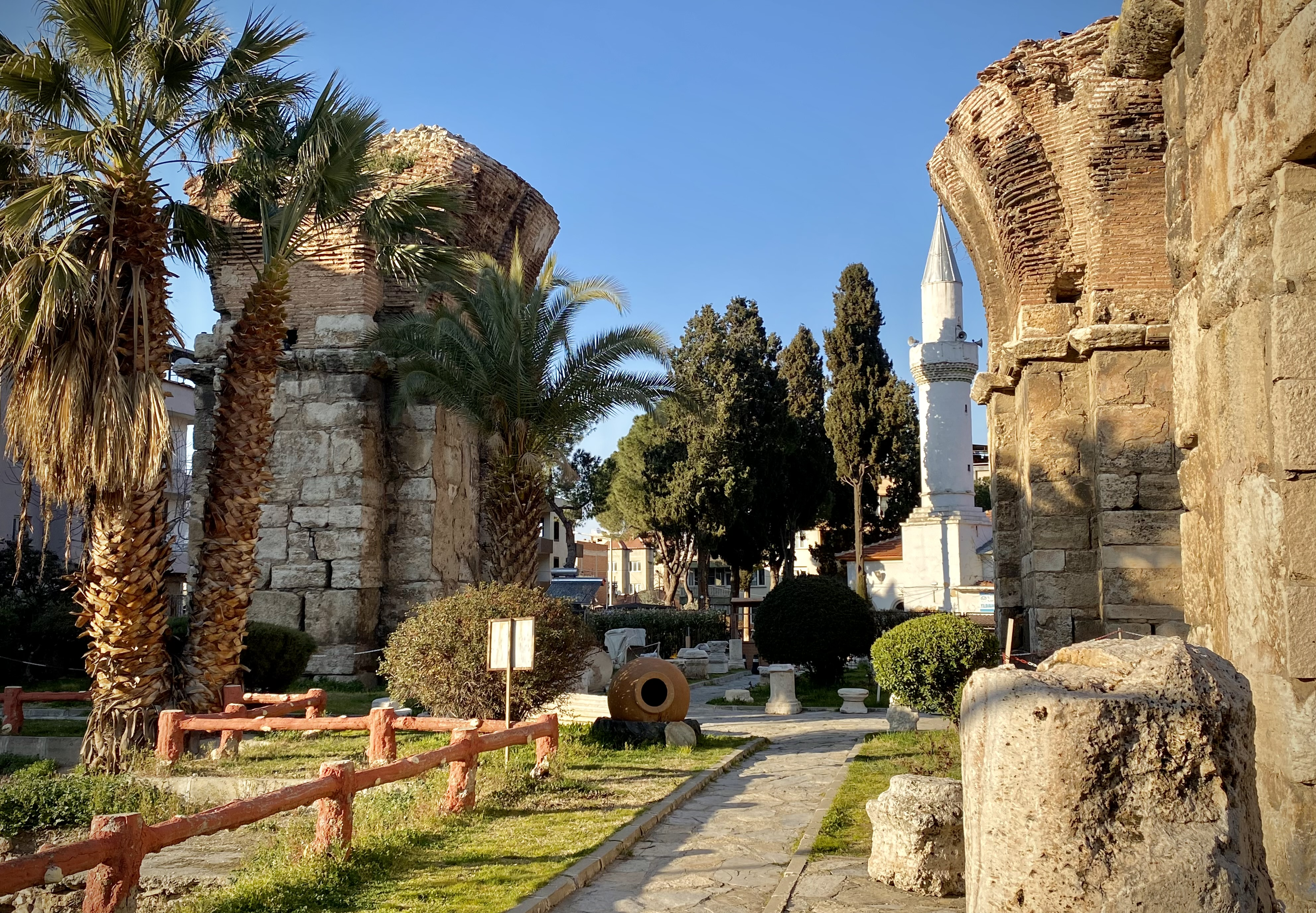
- Ruins of the St. Jean Church, or ("Seven Churches of Revelation") in Philadelphia

- Logo

- Map showing Alaşehir District in Manisa Province

- Location within Turkey Location within Turkey Aegean
- Coordinates: 38°21′N 28°31′E
- Country: Turkey
- Province: Manisa
- Area: 971 km^{2} (375 sq mi)
- Population (2022): 104,717
  - Density: 108/km^{2} (279/sq mi)
- Time zone: UTC+3 (TRT)
- Area code: 0236
- Website: www.alasehir.bel.tr

Alaşehir (Turkish pronunciation: [aˈɫaʃehiɾ]) is a municipality and district of Manisa Province, Turkey. Its area is 971 km^{2}, and its population is 104,717 (2022). It is situated in the valley of the Kuzuçay (Cogamus in antiquity), at the foot of the Bozdağ Mountain (Mount Tmolus in antiquity). The town is connected to İzmir by a 105 km (65 mi) railway.

Founded in antiquity as Philadelphia (Greek: Φιλαδέλφεια, i.e., "the city of him who loves his brother"), the town was known as such until it was conquered by the Ottomans in 1390.

Alaşehir stands on elevated ground commanding the extensive and fertile plain of the Gediz River (Hermus in antiquity), presenting an imposing appearance when seen from a distance. It has about 45 mosques. There are small industries and a fair trade. From one of the mineral springs comes a heavily charged water popular around Turkey.

Within Turkey, the city's name is synonymous with the dried Sultana raisins, although cultivation for the fresh fruit market, less labour-intensive than the dried fruit, has gained prominence in recent decades. As Philadelphia, Alaşehir was a highly important center in the Early Christian and Byzantine periods. It remained a strong center of Orthodox Christianity until the early 20th century, and remains a titular see of the Roman Catholic Church.

== Name ==
The Turkish name Alaşehir, which translates as "multicolored town", is first attested in the memoir of the 13th-century historian Ibn Bibi. The town was founded by King Attalus II Philadelphus (r. 159–138 BC) of Pergamon with the Greek name "Philadelphia". According to numismatic evidence, Philadelphia was briefly given the Latin name "Neocaesarea" during the reigns of the Roman emperors Caligula (r. 37–41) and Claudius (r. 41–54). The town reverted to its original name Philadelphia after Claudius, but under Emperor Vespasian (r. 69–79), the town used the Latin appellation Flavia to honor the imperial house (i.e. "Flavia Philadelphia"). The town remained known as Philadelphia until the Ottoman conquest in 1390.

== Geography ==
Philadelphia was historically located in Lydia near the northeast foot of Mount Tmolus (modern-day Bozdağ) in the rich valley of the Cogamis river, which was a southern tributary of the Hermus River (modern-day Gediz). It was located in southern Catacecaumene, on the road connecting Sardis and Laodicea. Philadelphia was well known for its vulnerability to earthquakes.

== History ==
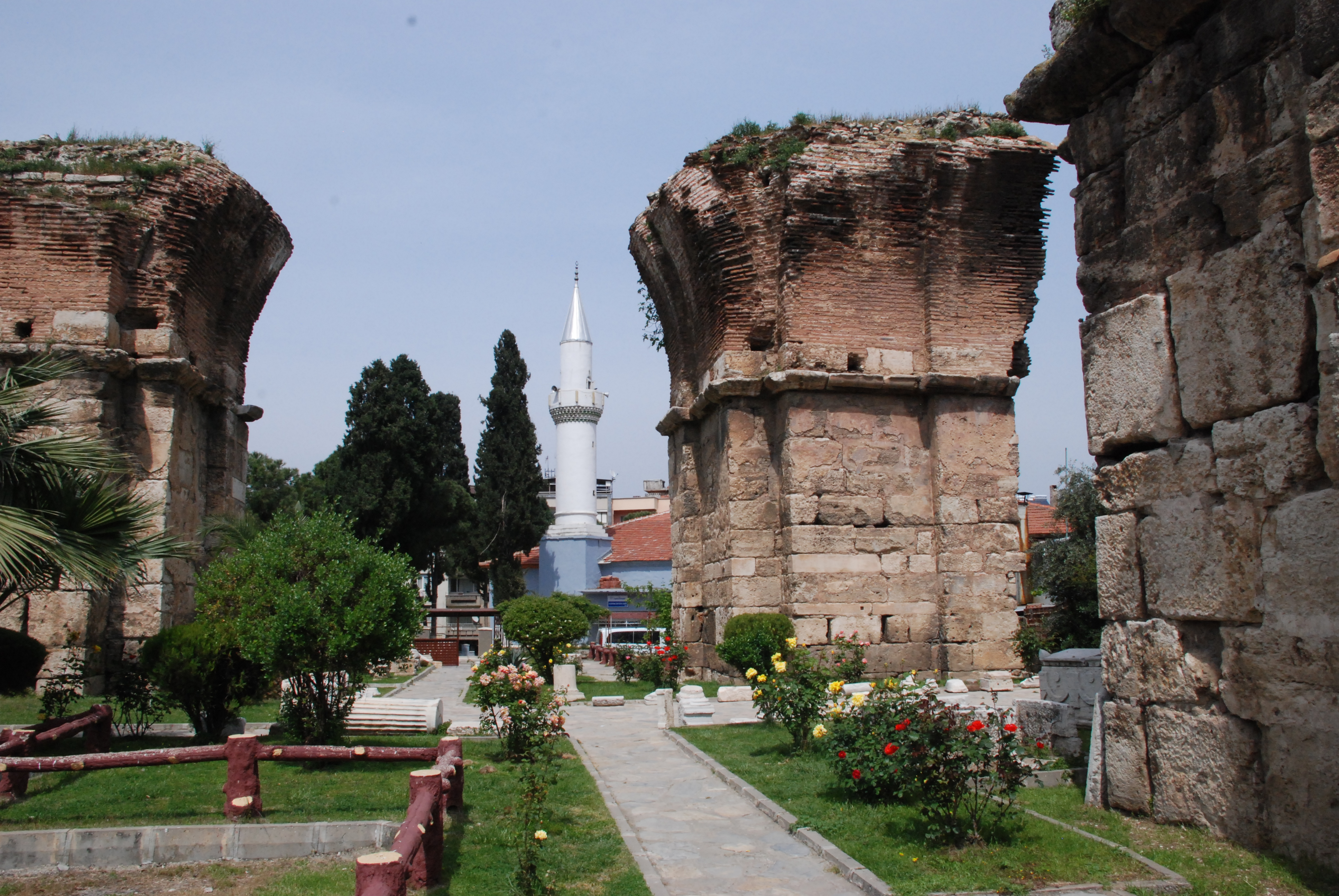
Church of St John, Philadelphia (Alaşehir)

Ancient episcopal sees of the late Roman province of Lydia are listed in the Annuario Pontificio as titular sees:

=== Ancient Philadelphia ===
Alaşehir began as perhaps one of the first ancient cities with the name Philadelphia. It was established in 189 BC by King Eumenes II of Pergamon (197–160 BC). Eumenes II named the city for the love of his brother, who would be his successor, Attalus II (159–138 BC), whose loyalty earned him the nickname, "Philadelphos", literally meaning "one who loves his brother". The city is perhaps best known as the site of one of the seven churches of Asia in the Book of Revelation.

Lacking an heir, Attalus III Philometer, the last of the Attalid kings of Pergamum, bequeathed his kingdom, including Philadelphia, to his Roman allies when he died in 133 BC. Rome established the province of Asia in 129 BC by combining Ionia and the former Kingdom of Pergamon.

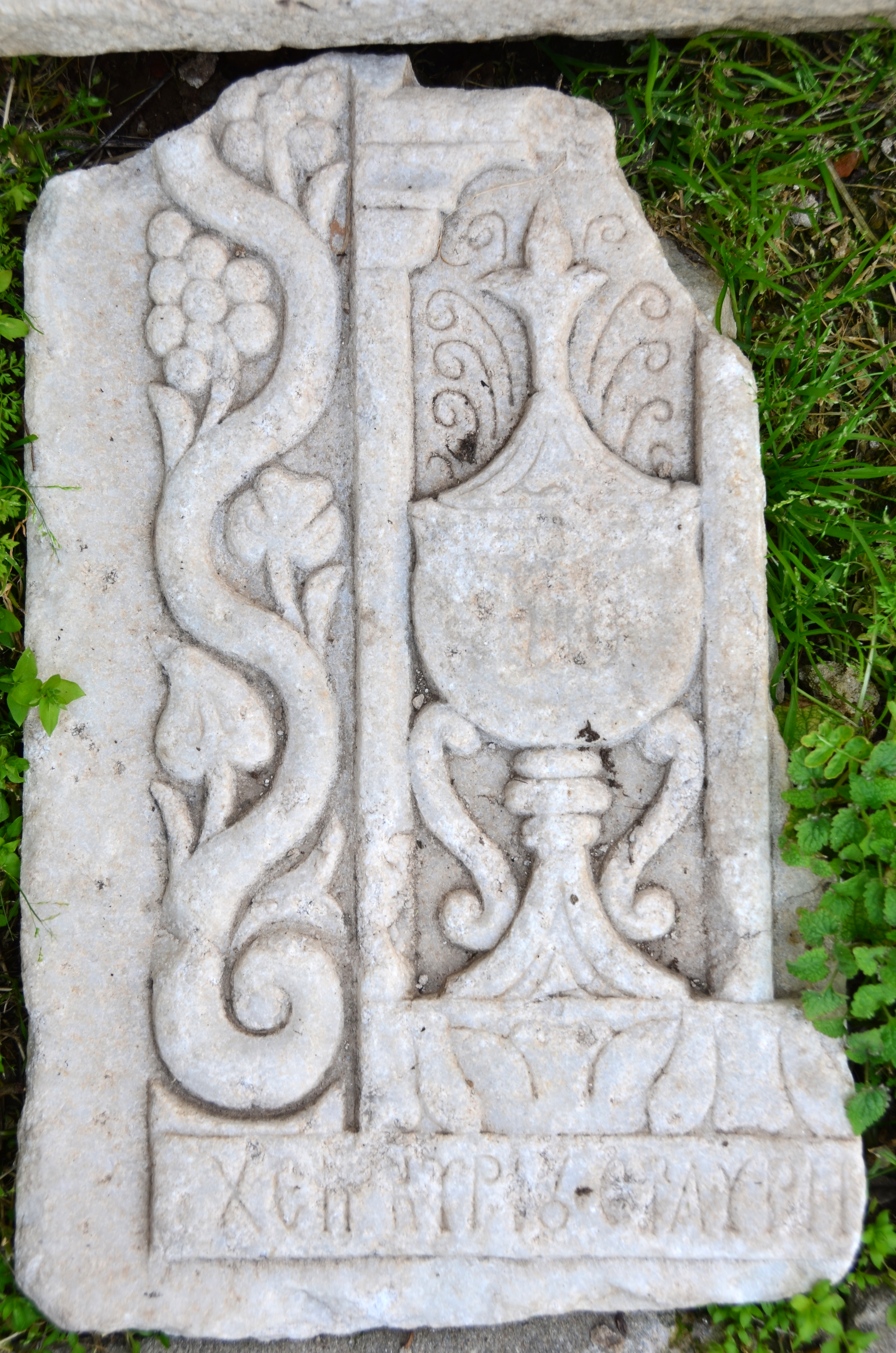
St. Jean Church, carved stone slab lying on the floor in Alaşehir

=== Roman Philadelphia ===
Philadelphia was in the administrative district of Sardis (Pliny NH 5.111). In AD 17, the city suffered badly in an earthquake, and Roman Emperor Tiberius relieved it of having to pay taxes (Tacitus Annales 2.47, cf. Strabo 12.8.18, 13.4.10, John Lydus de mensibus 4.115). In response, the city granted honors to Tiberius. Evidence from coinage reveals that Caligula helped the city; under Vespasian, Philadelphia received his cognomen, Flavia. Under Caracalla, Philadelphia housed an imperial cult. Its coins bore the word Neokoron (literally, "temple-sweeper", caretaker of the temple). A small theatre, located at the northern edge of Toptepe Hill, is all that remains of Roman Philadelphia.

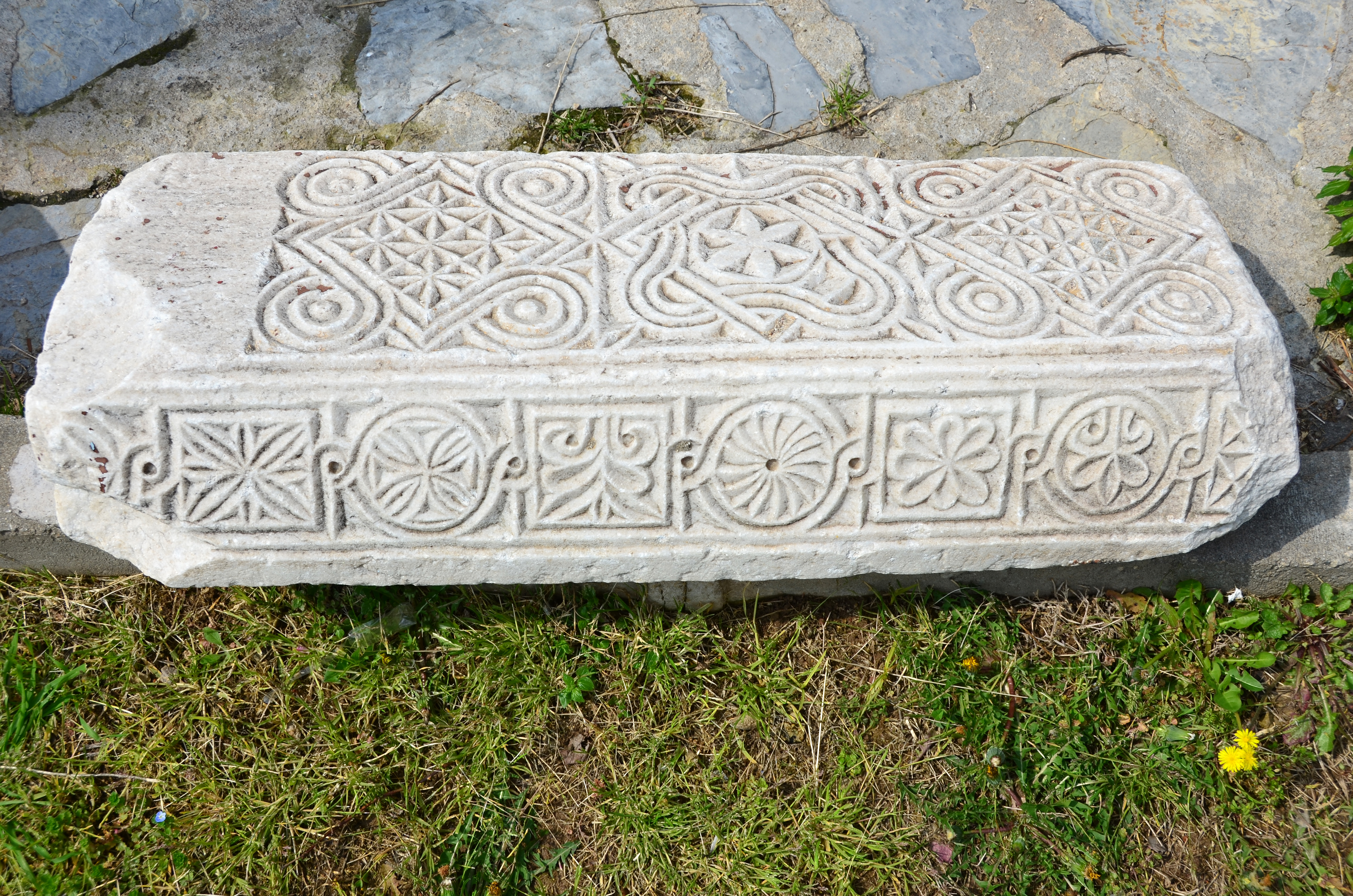
St. Jean Church, carved stone slab lying on the floor in Alaşehir

=== Philadelphia in the Book of Revelation ===
Although several ancient cities bore the name of Philadelphia, it is generally agreed to be the one listed among the seven churches written to by John in the Book of Revelation. Philadelphia is listed as the sixth church of the seven. A letter specifically addressed to the Philadelphian church, a community with "little power", is recorded in Revelation 3:7–13. The city's history of earthquakes may lie behind the reference to making her church "a pillar in the temple" (Revelation 3:12).

Together with Smyrna, Philadelphia is one of only two of the seven churches of Asia whose messages in Revelation contain no rebuke. This may explain why modern Protestant churches sometimes use "Philadelphia" as a component in the local church's name as a way of emphasizing its faithfulness. Although the community is described as having "little power", it is commended for keeping Christ's word and not denying his name. The description of Christ as the one who has the "key of David" (Revelation 3:7) alludes to Isaiah 22:22, while the promise to the one who conquers of becoming "a pillar in the temple of my God" and bearing the names of God, the New Jerusalem, and Christ (Revelation 3:12) anticipates imagery developed later in the book. In the Orthodox patristic tradition, Andrew of Caesarea interpreted the "key of David" as a symbol of Christ's authority and also associated the key with the Holy Spirit, through whom the treasures of Scripture are opened; he understood the promised "pillar" as the victor's steadfast establishment in the truth.

=== Philadelphia in Patristic literature ===
Philadelphia remained a major Christian center also after the New Testament period. One of Ignatius of Antioch's epistles in early 2nd century was addressed to the Christians of that city.

Church historian Eusebius recognized Ammia of Philadelphia, an early Christian prophetess active in the late 1st and early 2nd centuries CE, as a key contributor to the apostolic prophetic tradition in the Philadelphia community. Her ministry aligned with orthodox Christianity, adhering to mainstream beliefs of the time. Eusebius described her as one who "prophesied under the New Covenant," distinguishing her from Montanism, who sought to claim her legacy.

=== Byzantine Philadelphia ===
Philadelphia was a prosperous Byzantine city that was called the "little Athens" in the 6th century AD because of its festivals and temples. Presumably, that indicates that the city was not entirely converted to Christianity. In about 600, the domed Basilica of St. John was built, remains of which are the main archaeological attraction in the modern city. The Byzantine walls that once surrounded the city have all but crumbled away. A few remnants are still visible at the northeast edge of town, near the bus stand. The city was taken by the Seljuk Turks in 1074 and 1093–1094. In 1098, during the First Crusade, it was recovered by Byzantine Emperor Alexios I. In the 11th to the 15th centuries AD, it was the seat of the doux (governor) and stratopedarches (military commander) of the Thrakesion theme.

It was the centre of several revolts against ruling Byzantine emperors: in 1182, led by John Komnenos Vatatzes, and 1188–1205 or 1206, led by Theodore Mangaphas, a local Philadelphian, against Isaac II Angelos. At that time, the bishopric of Philadelphia was promoted to metropolis. In the 14th century, Philadelphia was made the metropolis of Lydia by the Greek Orthodox patriarch of Constantinople, a status that it still holds. It was granted this honour because the city did not capitulate to the Ottomans. The city was prosperous especially in the 13th and 14th centuries: there was a Genoese trading colony, and the city was an important producer of leather goods and red-dyed silk (whence, perhaps, its Turkish name, which probably means "red city"). By the 14th century, the city was surrounded by Ottoman emirates but maintained nominal allegiance to the Byzantine emperor. The city remained prosperous through trade and its strategic location.

Philadelphia was an independent neutral city under the influence of the Latin Knights of Rhodes, when it was taken in 1390 by Bayezid I. Prior to Bayezid I's conquest, it was the last Byzantine Greek stronghold in Asia Minor. Twelve years later, it was captured by Timur, who built a wall with the corpses of his prisoners. Later, it passed into the rule of Junayd until it was ultimately captured by Murad II.

=== Modern period ===
From 1867 until 1922, Alaşehir was part of the Aidin Vilayet of the Ottoman Empire. In 1890, its population consisted of 17,000 Muslims and 4,000 Greeks according to Vital Cuinet. Through the end of the Greco-Turkish War, Alaşehir was largely destroyed by fires set by retreating Greek forces. Patrick Kinross wrote, "Alaşehir was no more than a dark scorched cavity, defacing the hillside. Village after village had been reduced to an ash-heap." It is estimated that some 3,000 people died, and 4,300 out of 4,500 buildings were destroyed in the burning of Alaşehir.

A suburb of Athens, Nea Filadelfia ("New Philadelphia"), is named from the Greek refugees from Alaşehir (in Greek known as "Philadelphia") who settled there following the war and the population exchange between Greece and Turkey of 1923.

The city was the site of the Alaşehir Congress in 1919.

In 1969, a magnitude 6.7 earthquake struck the city and killed 53 people.

== Archaeological remains ==
For survey of remains see Erdoğan (2015).

- Ancient Theater (38.345933°N 28.513970°E)
- Ancient Stadium (38.345633°N 28.511265°E)
- Ancient Temple (38.345505°N 28.514556°E)
- Necropolis and hypogea (38.348176°N 28.507955°E)
- Byzantine city walls (38.350563°N 28.523595°E)
- Basilica of St John (38.349191°N 28.517434°E)

== Composition ==
There are 87 neighbourhoods in Alaşehir District:

- Akkeçili
- Alhan
- Aydoğdu
- Azıtepe
- Badınca
- Bahadır
- Bahçedere
- Bahçeliköy
- Baklacı
- Barış
- Belenyaka
- Beşeylül
- Caberburhan
- Caberfakılı
- Caberkonaklı
- Çağlayan
- Çakırcaali
- Çamlıbel
- Çarıkbozdağ
- Çarıkkaralar
- Çarıktekke
- Çeşneli
- Dağarlar
- Dağhacıyusuf
- Delemenler
- Erenköy
- Esentepe
- Evrenli
- Fatih
- Girelli
- Göbekli
- Gülenyaka
- Gülpınar
- Gümüşçay
- Gürsu
- Hacıbey
- Hacıhaliller
- Horzumalayaka
- Horzumembelli
- Horzumkeserler
- Horzumsazdere
- Ilgın
- Ilıca
- Işıklar
- İsmailbey
- İsmetiye
- İstasyon
- Karacalar
- Karadağ
- Kasaplı
- Kavaklıdere
- Kemaliye
- Kestanederesi
- Killik
- Kozluca
- Kurtuluş
- Kurudere
- Matarlı
- Menderes
- Narlıdere
- Örencik
- Örnekköy
- Osmaniye
- Piyadeler
- Şahyar
- Sakarya
- Sarıpınar
- Sarısu
- Selce
- Serinköy
- Serinyayla
- Şeyhsinan
- Sobran
- Soğanlı
- Soğuksu
- Soğukyurt
- Subaşı
- Tepeköy
- Toygarlı
- Türkmen
- Uluderbent
- Üzümlü
- Yeni
- Yenice
- Yeniköy
- Yeşilyurt
- Yuvacalı

== Notable people from Alaşehir ==
- Joannes Laurentius Lydus (b. 490) Byzantine Greek administrator and writer.
- Constantine Angelos (c. 1093 – after 1166), Byzantine aristocrat, military commander and sebastohypertatos
- Theodore Mangaphas known also as Morotheodoros (fl. c. 1188–1205), Byzantine Greek military officer and usurper.
- Matthew of Ephesus (1272/3–1355/7), Byzantine Greek theologian, writer and Metropolitan of Ephesus.
- Kenan Evren, Turkish president and general.
- Ange Postecoglou, Greek-Australian professionall football manager and former player, has ancestral ties to the town through his paternal grandparents who were from Alasehir and migrated to Athens, Greece during the Greek-Turkish populations exchange in 1923.

== Notable bishops ==
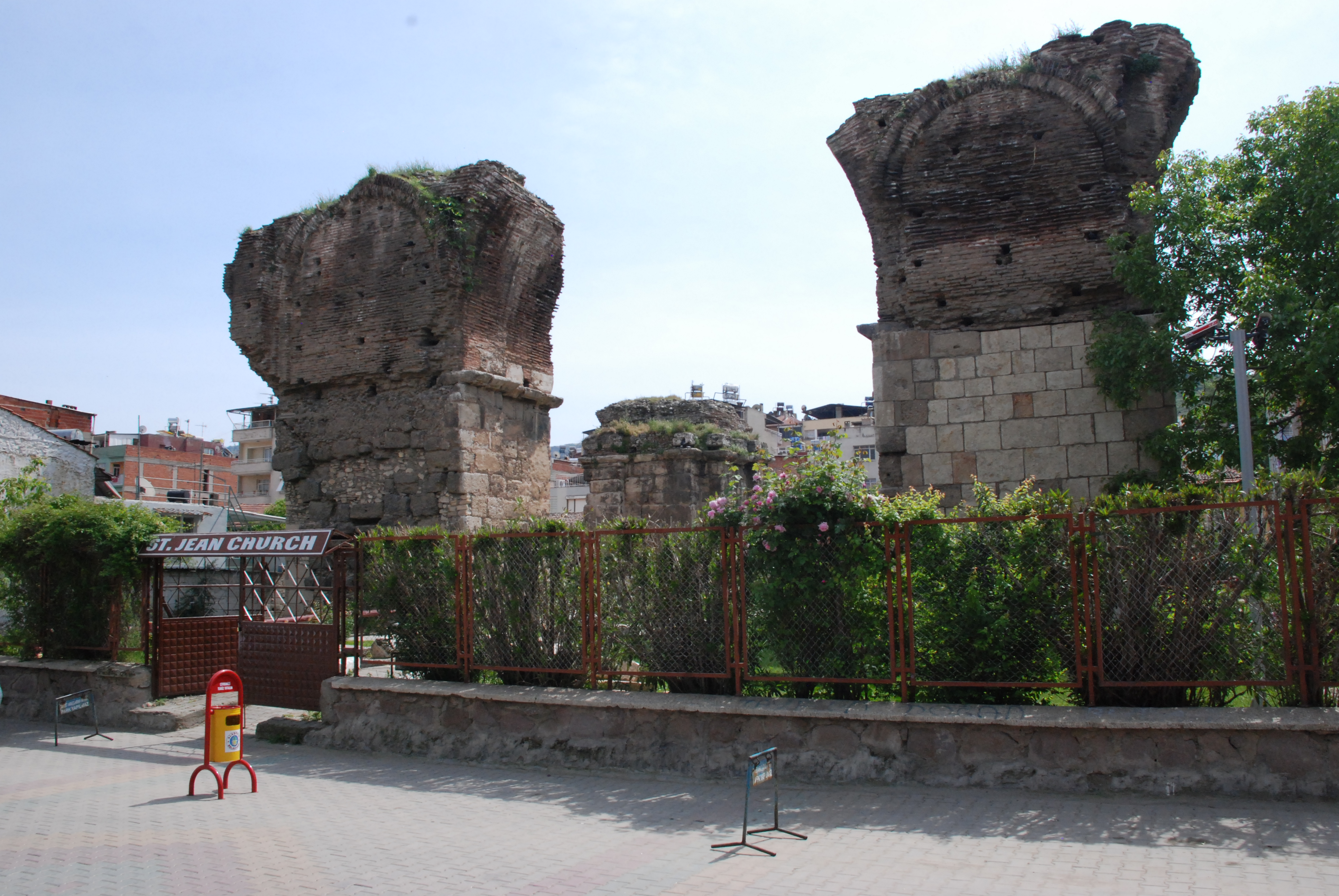
Church of St. John.

- Cyriacus (at the Council of Philippopolis, 344)
- Theodosius (deposed at the Council of Seleucia, 359)
- Theophanes (at the First Council of Ephesus, 431)
- John (at the Third Council of Constantinople, 680)
- Theoleptos of Philadelphia (1283–1322): led defense of the city against the Turks during the Second Siege of Philadelphia. His writings include religious poetry, monastic treatises, anti-Arsenite writings and a series of letters.
- Macarius Chrysocephalas (1336–1382): candidate for patriarchate in 1353, wrote Rhodonia (anthology of proverbs and gnomai), catenae ("chains", quotations from theologians attached to Bible verses) on Matthew and Luke, homilies, and a vita of Saint Meletios of Galesios.

Greek-Orthodox metropolises in Asia Minor, c. 1880.

- Gabrius Severus (1577) wrote works against the Latins
- Gerasimus Blachus (1679), author of numerous works
- Meletius Typaldus (1685), deposed for becoming a Catholic

Philadelphia remains the seat of the Metropolis of Philadelphia, which has been a titular see since the Greco-Turkish population exchange.

Although the Philadelphia area was an Orthodox area, the Roman Catholic Church have maintained a rival titular bishop of Philadelphia since the 1500s. Catholic bishops have included:

- Bernardo Jordán, (14 Apr 1535 Appointed – 1539)
- Philippe Musnier (15 Jun 1545 –)
- Marcus Lyresius (8 Jan 1603 Appointed – 28 Jun 1611)
- Georg Christoph Rösch (16 Jul 1612 Appointed – 30 Nov 1634)
- Michael Dalmeras (23 Oct 1623 Appointed – 13 Dec 1629)
- William Giles (9 Sep 1904 Appointed – 28 Jul 1913)
- Domenico Pasi (9 Sep 1913 Appointed – 15 Dec 1919)
- Francis Vazhapilly (7 Apr 1921 Appointed – 21 Dec 1923)
- Agnello Renzullo (11 Apr 1924 Appointed – 20 Oct 1925)
- Luigi Mazzini (24 Jun 1926 Appointed – 13 Dec 1950 Died)
- Pietro Zuccarino (5 Jan 1951 Appointed – 29 Nov 1953)
- João de Deus Ramalho, (9 Dec 1953 Appointed – 25 Feb 1958)
- Augustin Arce Mostajo (22 May 1958 Appointed – 26 Nov 1970)

== See also ==
- Nea Filadelfeia, a suburb of the Athens agglomeration, Greece
- Philadelphia, a city in the US state of Pennsylvania
- Christianity in the 1st century
- Christianity in the 2nd century
- Early centers of Christianity
- Early Christian art and architecture
- Early Christianity
- List of earthquakes in Turkey
