= Theoleptos of Philadelphia =

Byzantine monk, writer and metropolitan bishop

Saint Theoleptos

Metropolitan Bishop of Philadelphia
- Born: c. 1250; Nicaea
- Died: 1322; Philadelphia
- Venerated in: Eastern Orthodox Church
- Feast: 25 June
- Influences: Nikephoros the Monk, Neilos of Sicily
- Influenced: Gregory Palamas, Matthew of Ephesus, Nikephoros Choumnos, Irene Choumnaina Theology career
- Theological work
- Tradition or movement: Hesychasm
- Main interests: Eastern Christian monasticism, Christian mysticism, Hierocratism
- Major works: On Inner Work in Christ and the Monastic Profession, Philokalia

Theoleptos of Philadelphia (Greek: Θεόληπτος Φιλαδελφείας, c. 1250–1322) was an influential 13th and 14th century Byzantine Greek monk, Christian mystic, theological polemicist, writer and saint. He served as the metropolitan bishop of Philadelphia from 1284 to 1322, from where he remained active in both the religious and the political life of the early Palaiologan period. He was an anti-Unionist, an anti-Arsenite, an advocate for the expansion of ecclesiastical authority, and was militarily involved in the defence his metropolis twice from besiegment by Turkoman ghazis. Because of his disagreements with the emperor's reconciliatory religious policy, he led a brief six-year-long schism centred in Philadelphia.

== Biography ==
=== Early life and monastic activity ===
Theoleptos was born in Nicaea around 1250. He was a married deacon and a father. He would often retire into the countryside around Nicaea in order to practise asceticism in nearby monasteries, and in 1275 he left his family and property in order to become a monk. He was a strong opponent of the union of the Eastern Orthodox and Roman Catholic churches, which had been agreed at the Second Council of Lyon in 1274 with the intent of mending the Great Schism. After the union was proclaimed in Constantinople on 16 January 1275, he and others monks near Nicaea protested against it. Theoleptos was arrested and brought before the Byzantine Emperor Michael VIII Palaiologos in the capital. There, he accused the emperor of perverting the sacred scriptures, and was promptly beaten and briefly imprisoned. For his opposition to the union, he was also excommunicated by Patriarch John XI Bekkus. While imprisoned, he probably met and became the disciple of Nikephoros the Monk around 1276.

After being released, he went back to being a monk in Nicaea. Fot a year, his wife attempted to persuade him to return to her without success. During the 8 years he spent as an ascetic, he was sought out by many who believed him to be a defender of Orthodoxy and a spiritual advisor. He also became acquainted with the monk Neilos of Sicily, who acted as his guide, and allegedly also appeared in his dreams three days after he had died, which greatly impacted Theoleptos. He then spent time in the monastic community of Mount Athos, where he became acquainted with the mystical traditions of Orthodox monasticism.

=== Metropolitan bishop of Philadelphia ===
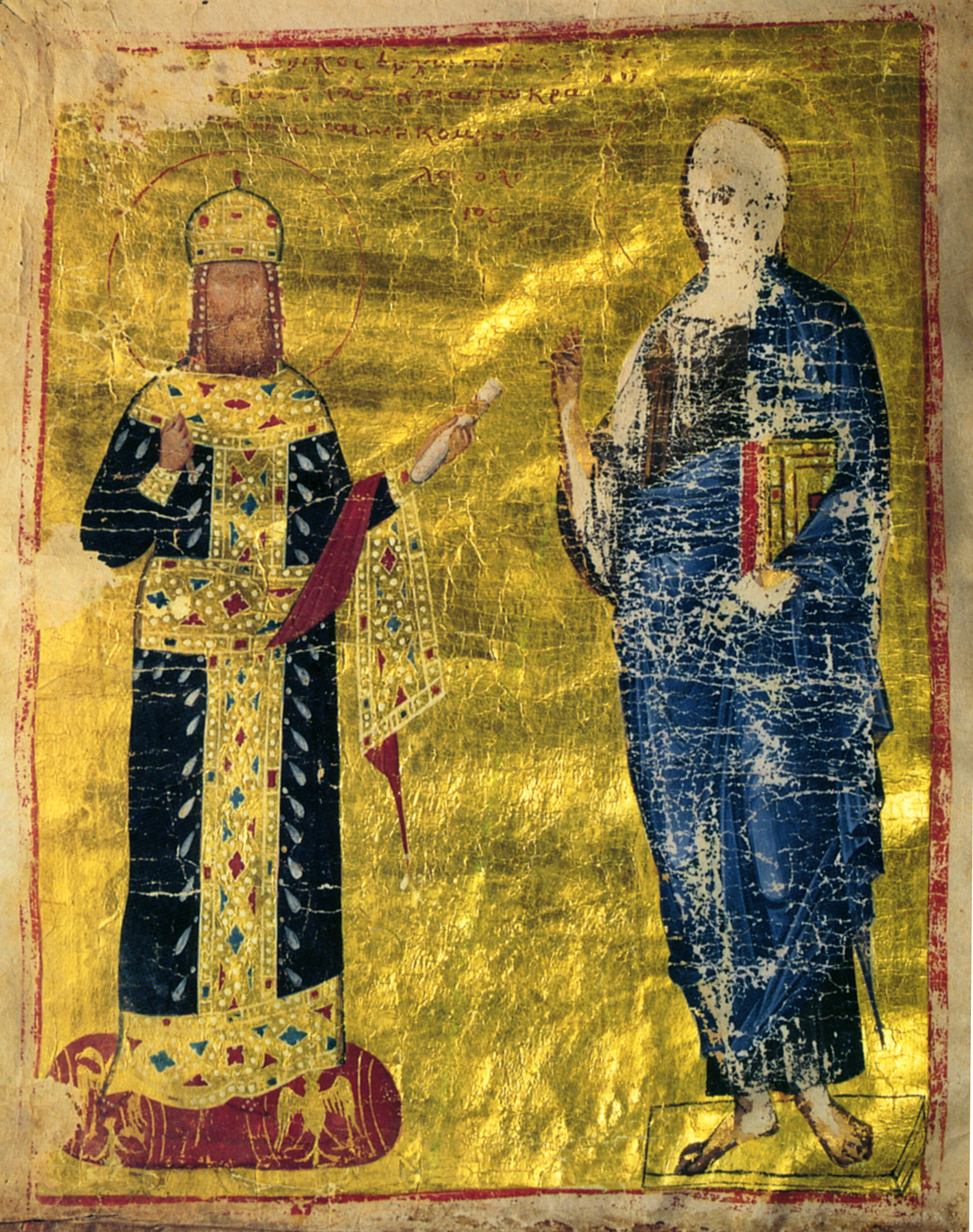
Chrysobull depicting the Byzantine Emperor Andronikos II next to Christ Pantocrator

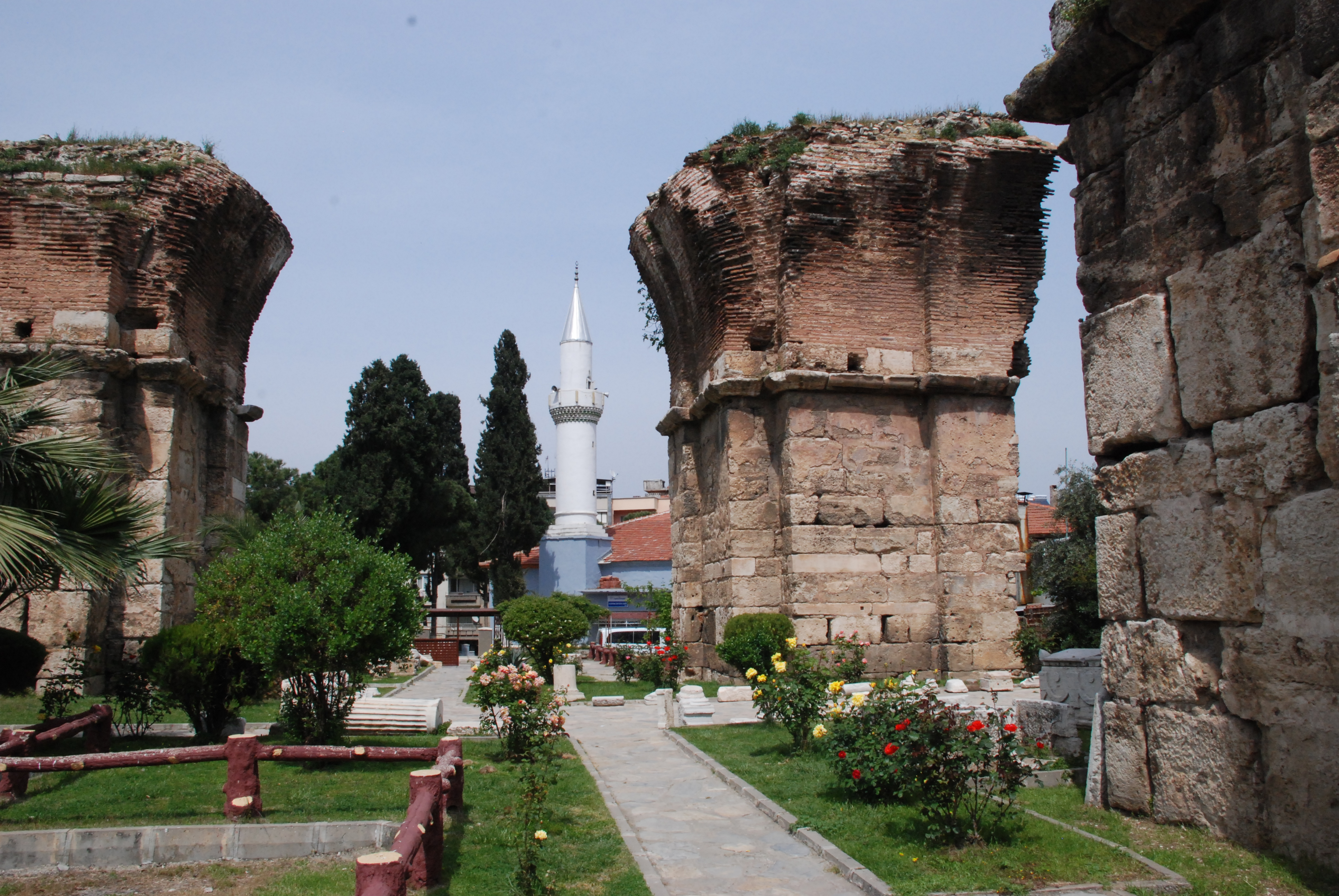
Ruins of the Basilica of Saint John of Philadelphia

After the union of the churches broke down following Michael's excommunication by Pope Martiv IV, and after the emperor himself died and was succeeded by his son, the anti-Unionist Andronikos II Palaiologos, Theoleptos became the metropolitan bishop of Philadelphia, the spiritual leader of the ecclesiastical province, in 1283/84, at the age of 33. He remained in his see for forty years until his death, and played a decisive role in the political and religious affairs of the city during this period.

==== Involvement in Gregory II's resignation ====
During the 1285 Council of Constantinople, which was a response to the Second Council of Lyon, the Patriarch Gregory II attempted to more closely define the Orthodox position on the matter of the Filioque in the Tomos of Blachernai. However, a portion of the clergy stood against his views on the matter, most prominent of which was Theoleptos. The situation was escalated when the former student of Gregory II, a monk named Mark, published his own commentary on the Tomos of Blachernai in hopes to mediate the controversy. The opposition to the patriarch eventually divided into two groups. The first group was led by the Metropolitan of Ephesus John Cheilas and Daniel of Kyzikos, and sought the removal of Gregory II and the condemnation of his position. The second group was led by Theoleptos, who (after consulting with Theodoros Mouzalon) had changed his views and considered Mark to be responsible for the controversy, and not Gregory II. According to historian Robert Sinkewicz:

The affair was finally settled in June 1289 at an assembly in the imperial palace. Theoleptos pronounced publicly on the patriarch's orthodoxy and attributed the cause of all the troubles to Mark. As he had agreed to do, for the sake of the peace of the church, Gregorios offered his script of resignation on the next day–but without his signature. This provoked a certain amount of consternation but the metropolitan of Philadelpheia [sic] managed to quell the objection and the patriarch dutifully retired.

==== Accusations against John Tarchaneiotes ====
Around 1300, Theoleptos was approached by members of the provincial aristocracy, who convinced him to denounce the Arsenite general John Tarchaneiotes on the grounds of planning a rebellion. Their motives lay to their dissatisfaction with Tarchaneiotes' military reforms, redistribution of pronoia, and fight against corruption within the army. After the accusations began, the general was forced to flee to a monastery in Pyrgion. There, Theoleptos and Tarchaneiotes' enemies presented their accusations from outside the monastery walls. Tarchaneiotes denied all accusations, but was forced to flee from Asia Minor.

==== Ecclesiastical activity ====
While being metropolitan of Philadelphia, Theoleptos was also a signatory in synodal decisions under the patriarchates of Gregory II and John XII, travelling to the capital in 1288 and 1297 respectively. In 1301, he again travelled to Constantinople to support John XIII, in opposition to the restoration of John Cheilas to the metropolis of Ephesus, after his removal from the see in 1289 for refusing to recognize the orthodoxy of Gregory II. In July 1302, he once more travelled to the capital to support the patriarch and condemn the Metropolitan of Selymbria Hilarion, on the charge of calumny.

When Theoleptos stayed the capital in 1307–1308, he met and taught monastic practices to the young Gregory Palamas, who regarded Theoleptos as a forerunner of his own mystical doctrine of Hesychasm.

==== Role in the First Siege of Philadelphia ====
In 1304, Philadelphia was besieged by the Germiyanids of Yakub I and the Aydınids of Mehmed. As its metropolitan, Theoleptos contributed to the defence of the city, which was eventually relieved by the Catalan Company of Roger de Flor. The Catalan chronicle of Francisco de Moncada describes that: "...Theoleptus, their bishop, a man of rare sanctity, whose prayers had done more to defend the city than had the arms of the people who guarded it...".

==== Role in the Second Siege of Philadelphia ====
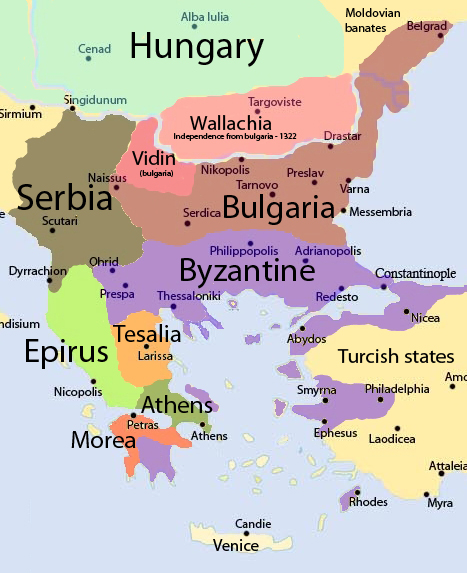
The Byzantine Empire in 1307, when Philadelphia (southeastern corner of the map) became surrounded by Turkish beyliks

Theoleptos also contributed to the city's successful defence against the Germiyanids during the Second Siege of Philadelphia in 1310/11. He took personal control of the administration and defence of the city, as he helped maintain morale, organized the distribution of food and negotiated with the Turks. He probably negotiated tribute payment in the spring of 1311.

However, Theoleptos often clashed with the city's military governor, Manuel Tagaris, insisting that the soldiers should obey him. During the siege, he sent his protonotarios, Manuel Gabalas, to Constantinople, in order to request aid against the Turks and rally support for the removal of Tagaris from his position, although he was unsuccessful in both endeavours.

==== Theoleptos' Schism ====
On 14 September 1310, Patriarch Niphon I and Emperor Andronikos II organized a conciliation ceremony in the Hagia Sophia, in which the Arsenite Schism was resolved. However, Theoleptos criticized the patriarch for conducting the conciliaton ceremony without his presence, as he could not travel to Constantinople during the siege. He also opposed the reconciliation of the Church with the Arsenite faction, and refused communion with Constantinople. This resulted in Theoleptos' Schism between himself and the Patriarchate of Constantinople, which lasted from 1311 to 1317.

During the schism, Theoleptos placed Manuel Gabalas under canonical censure and barred him from participating in church duties. The reasons behind this lay in Gabalas' disagreements with Theoleptos' hierocratic ideas, his support of a reconciliation with the Arsenites, him being originally sympathetic towards Manuel Tagaris, and him reporting the corruption, forgery and adultery of Theoleptos' nephew to the emperor.

In 1313, Andronikos II called upon Theoleptos to come to Constantinople to justify his actions, but the metropolitan declined, asserting that "it is not within the competence of the emperor to correct an erring priest".

After six years, communion between Philadelphia and Constantinople was reestablished, as between September 1317 and February 1319, Theoleptos assisted to a series of synodal decisions in the capital. Due to his position within the clergy, he faced minimal consequences for his schism. Manuel Gabalas may have contributed as mediator between Theoleptos and Patriarch John XIII. By 1317, Theoleptos and Manuel had also probably reconciled, as they travelled together to Constantinople.

==== Later activity and death ====
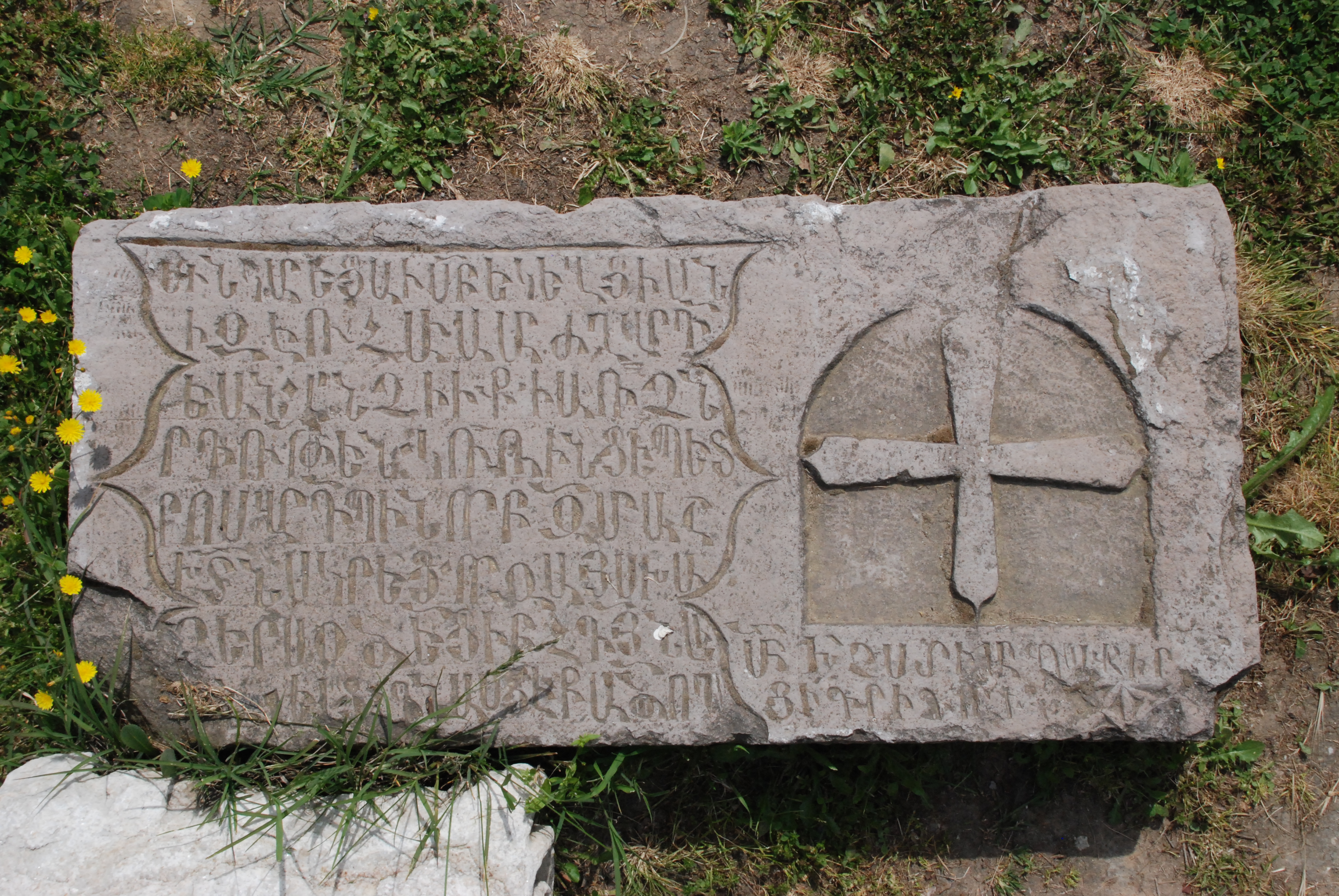
Christian tombstone, located amongst the ruins of the Basilica of Saint John of Philadelphia, where Theoleptos would preach

In 1321, Theoleptos was in Constantinople alongside Gabalas and Tagaris. He participated in the emperor's embassy to Adrianople, which sought the reconciliation between Andronikos II and his rebelling grandson, the future Emperor Andronikos III.

Theoleptos and Gabalas probably returned to Philadelphia around November of the same year. After returning to his see, Theoleptos wrote several texts between May 1321 and 1322. He died around November 1322, following a rapid illness.

After his death, the statesman and scholar Nikephoros Choumnos, and his disciple Manuel Gabalas, wrote funeral orations on him. Theoleptos became regarded as a saint by the Orthodox Church and is commemorated on June 25.

== Character and Works ==
=== Writings and influence on Hesychasm ===
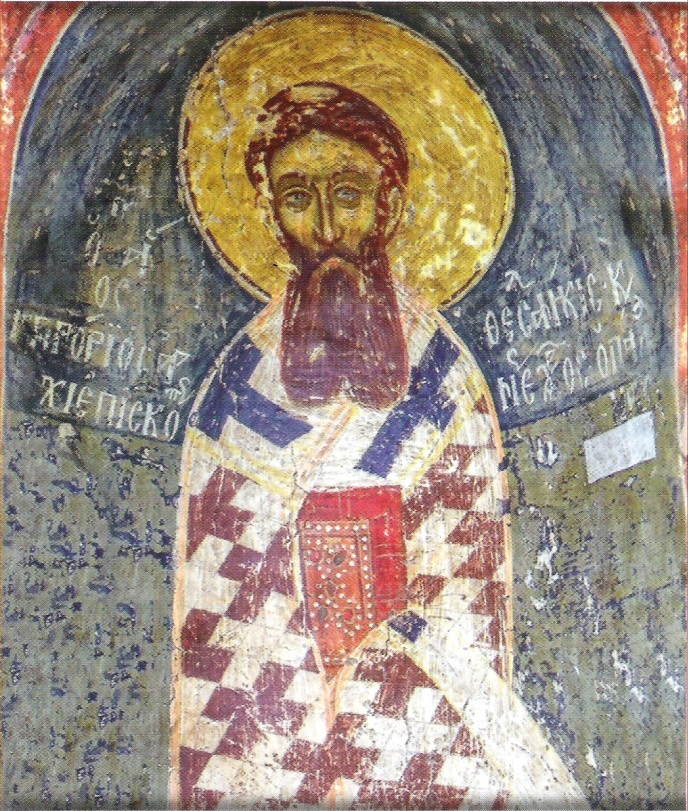
1401 fresco of Gregory Palamas from the Church of the Three Saints, in Kastoria

Some of Theoleptos' writings are found in the Philokalia collection, although most of his writings remain unpublished. He was involved in Christian mysticism and wrote a series of discourses on monasticism and asceticism. He greatly contributed to the revival of Byzantine spirituality and influenced Gregory Palamas and his theological doctrine of Hesychasm, which would spark the Hesychast controversy and would eventually lead to the Fifth Council of Constantinople.

In his in Defence of the Holy Hesychasts, Palamas describes him as such:

...this true theologian, the most certain of contemplators of the true mysteries of God, who was renowned in our own time; I am speaking of Theoleptos, he who was truly inspired by God, the bishop of Philadelphia, who from Philadelphia, as from a lampstand, illuminated the whole world.

=== Hierocratism ===
Theoleptos was associated with the Patriarch Athanasios I, with whom he shared similar anti-Asrenite and anti-Unionist beliefs, and the same ideals of poverty, charity, moral integrity, and the Church's role. They were also both advocates for the idea of hierocratism and the further empowerment of the church, as opposed to that of the secular authorities.

In a homily delivered in Philadelphia at a time of drought, entitled "A Hortatory Address to the Faithful Walking in a Litany with the Holy Icons", Theoleptos incites the citizenry to repent, while referring to the conflict between himself and the secular authorities of the city. According to Byzantinist Dimiter Angelov:

Theoleptos castigated the civil officials of the city, who did not want to participate in church services together with the common folk out of sheer snobbery, boasted a vain sense of blood nobility, and accumulated their wealth in an unlawful manner. But the high point of the sermon was the demand that his flock fully obey the metropolitan, who was both their spiritual and military leader: "I am a general; if you listen to me and obey me, you will be saved. If not, the reverse will occur. I am a shepherd [John 10:14], and if you follow me, you will find your pasture; if not, the opposite will happen."

=== Influence on the Choumnos family ===
Theoleptos maintained close ties with the influential Choumnos family. He served as spiritual guide to both the statesman Nikephoros Choumnos, and to his daughter, the Basilissa Irene Choumnaina. Under his guidance, Irene would become an abbess and the founder of the Monastery of Christ Philanthropos in Constantinople. Theoleptos even travelled to Constantinople to perform her tonsure ceremony in 1308. It is through his correspondence with her that his theological views are best known, as the majority of his surviving 23 speeches were directed to the monastic community of Christ Philanthropos.

=== List of works ===
==== Letters ====
Theoleptos' surviving letters are the following:

1. First Letter (late spring to summer 1307)
2. Second Letter (between December 1321 and spring 1322)
3. Third Letter (between December 1321 and spring 1322)
4. Fourth Letter (between December 1321 and spring 1322)
5. Fifth Letter (November 1322)

==== Monastic discourses ====
Theoleptos' surviving monastic discourses are the following:

1. Hidden Activity in Christ (1307)
2. Vigilance and Prayer (1307)
3. Deliverance from Egypt (1307)
4. Tenth Sunday of Luke (26 November 1307)
5. Transfiguration (8 August 1308)
6. Hesychia and Prayer (Unknown)
7. Discernment of Passions (Unknown)
8. Submission to the Superior (Unknown)
9. Monastic Community (Unknown)
10. Silence (Unknown)
11. Cheesefare Sunday (5 March 1318)
12. Fasting (March 1318)
13. Christ's Birth (December 1319/20)
14. Humility (Unknown)
15. Spiritual Love (13–15 April 1321)
16. Untitled (Unknown)
17. Easter Sunday (19 April 1321)
18. Third Sunday after Easter: Myrrophores (3 May 1321)
19. Fourth Sunday after Easter: Paralytic (17 May 1321)
20. Fifth Sunday after Easter: Samaritan (17 May 1321)
21. Sixth Sunday after Easter: Man Blind from Birth (24 May 1321)
22. Pentecost (7 June 1321)
23. Spiritual Testament (early 1322)

==== Liturgical Compositions ====
The compositions attributed to Theoleptos are the following:

1. Canon in dulcissimum Iesum (Greek: ’Ιησοῦ γλυκύτατε Χριστέ, ’Ιησοῦ µακρόθυµε)
2. Canon Compunctionis (Greek: ’Απωσαµένη φροντίδας βιωτικάς)
3. In sanctum lohannem Damascenum (Greek: Ἡ μὲν χεὶρ τοῦ βαπτιστοῦ δεσποτικῆς κορυφῆς)
4. Ad regem caelestem (Greek: Οὐράνιε βασιλεῦ, φιλάνθρωπε κύριε, µακρόθυµε)
5. In monachos defunctos (Greek: Τὴν πολυτάραχον θάλασσαν)

== Bibliography ==
- Angelov, Dimiter (2007). Imperial Ideology and Political Thought in Byzantium (1204-1330). Cambridge University Press. ISBN 978-0-521-85703-1.
- Bartusis, Mark C. (1997). The Late Byzantine Army: Arms and Society 1204–1453. University of Pennsylvania Press. ISBN 0-8122-1620-2.
- Brombin, Alessia (2024). "Hesychast Prayer and Ascetic Virtue in Theoleptos of Philadelphia and Gregory Palamas: A Comparative Exploration". Dialogue. 8 (17). Sulkhan-Saba Orbeliani University.
- "Theoleptus Of Philadelphia. Greek Orthodox bishop". Encyclopaedia Britannica.
- Geanakoplos, Deno John (1959). Emperor Michael Palaeologus and the West, 1258–1282: A Study in Byzantine-Latin Relations. Cambridge, Massachusetts: Harvard University Press.
- Juan López, Juan Bautista (2024). Manuel Gabalas: Biography, Intellectual Network, Works and Thought (PDF) (PhD thesis). Department of Medieval Studies of the Central European University Private University, Vienna.
- Meyendorff, Jean (1959). Défense des saints hésychastes (in French). Louvain.
- Nicol, Donald M. (1993) [1972]. The Last Centuries of Byzantium, 1261–1453 (Second ed.). Cambridge University Press. ISBN 978-0-521-43991-6.
- "Saint Theoleptos, Metropolitan of Philadelphia". Orthodox Church in America.
- Palmer, G.E.H.; Sherrard, Philip; Ware, Kallistos, eds. (1995). The Philokalia: The Complete Text, Volume 4; Compiled by St. Nikodimos of the Holy Mountain & St. Markarios of Corinth. Faber and Faber. ISBN 9780571193820.
- Sinkewicz, Robert E., ed. (1992). Theoleptos of Philadelphia: The Monastic Discourses. Pontifical Institute of Medieval Studies. ISBN 0-88844-111-8.
- Talbot, Alice-Mary (1991). "Theoleptos". In Kazhdan, Alexander (ed.). The Oxford Dictionary of Byzantium. Oxford University Press. pp. 2056–2057. ISBN 978-0-19-504652-6.
- Trapp, Erich (2001). Prosopographisches Lexikon der Palaiologenzeit. Austrian Academy of Sciences. ISBN 978-3700130031.
