= Bishop of Philadelphia =

Bishop of Philadelphia can refer to the head of the following ecclesiastical dioceses:

- Metropolis of Philadelphia, one of the historical Seven Churches of Asia, in what is now Turkey
- Roman Catholic Archdiocese of Philadelphia, in the United States
- Ukrainian Catholic Archeparchy of Philadelphia, in the United States
