= John Palaiologos (son of Andronikos II) =

John Palaiologos (Greek: Ἱωάννης Παλαιολόγος; 1286–1307) was a son of the Byzantine Emperor Andronikos II Palaiologos (reigned 1282–1328) and his second wife, Irene of Montferrat.

He received the supreme courtly dignity of Despot on 22 May 1295, and married Irene Choumnaina, the daughter of Nikephoros Choumnos, in 1303. The pair did not have any children. From 1304, he served as governor of Thessalonica, where he made donations of property to the Hodegon Monastery. In 1305, the throne of the March of Montferrat became vacant and his mother wanted to send John to take it up, but was successfully opposed by the Patriarch of Constantinople, Athanasius I, so that John's younger brother Theodore was sent instead. John Palaiologos died in 1307 in Thessalonica. In 1321, his body was transferred to Constantinople and buried in the Pantokrator Monastery.

== Sources ==
- Trapp, Erich; Beyer, Hans-Veit; Kaplaneres, Sokrates; Leontiadis, Ioannis (1989). "21475. Παλαιολόγος Ἱωάννης". Prosopographisches Lexikon der Palaiologenzeit (in German). Vol. 9. Vienna: Verlag der Österreichischen Akademie der Wissenschaften. ISBN 3-7001-3003-1.
