= Nikephoros Choumnos =

13th and 14th-century Byzantine scholar

Mesazōn of the Byzantine Empire
- In office 1294–1305
- Monarch: Andronikos II Palaiologos
- Preceded by: Theodore Mouzalon
- Succeeded by: Theodore Metochites

Personal details
- Born: c. 1253
- Died: 16 January 1327 (aged c. 74) Constantinople, Byzantine Empire
- Children: John, George, Irene

Nikephoros Choumnos (Greek: Νικηφόρος Χοῦμνος; c. 1253 – 16 January 1327) was a Byzantine scholar and official of the early Palaiologan period, one of the most important figures in the flowering of arts and letters of the so-called "Palaiologan Renaissance". He is notable for his eleven-year tenure as chief minister of emperor Andronikos II Palaiologos, his intense intellectual rivalry with fellow scholar and official Theodore Metochites, and for building the monastery of the Theotokos Gorgoepēkoos (Θεοτόκος Γοργοεπήκοος) in Constantinople.

== Life ==
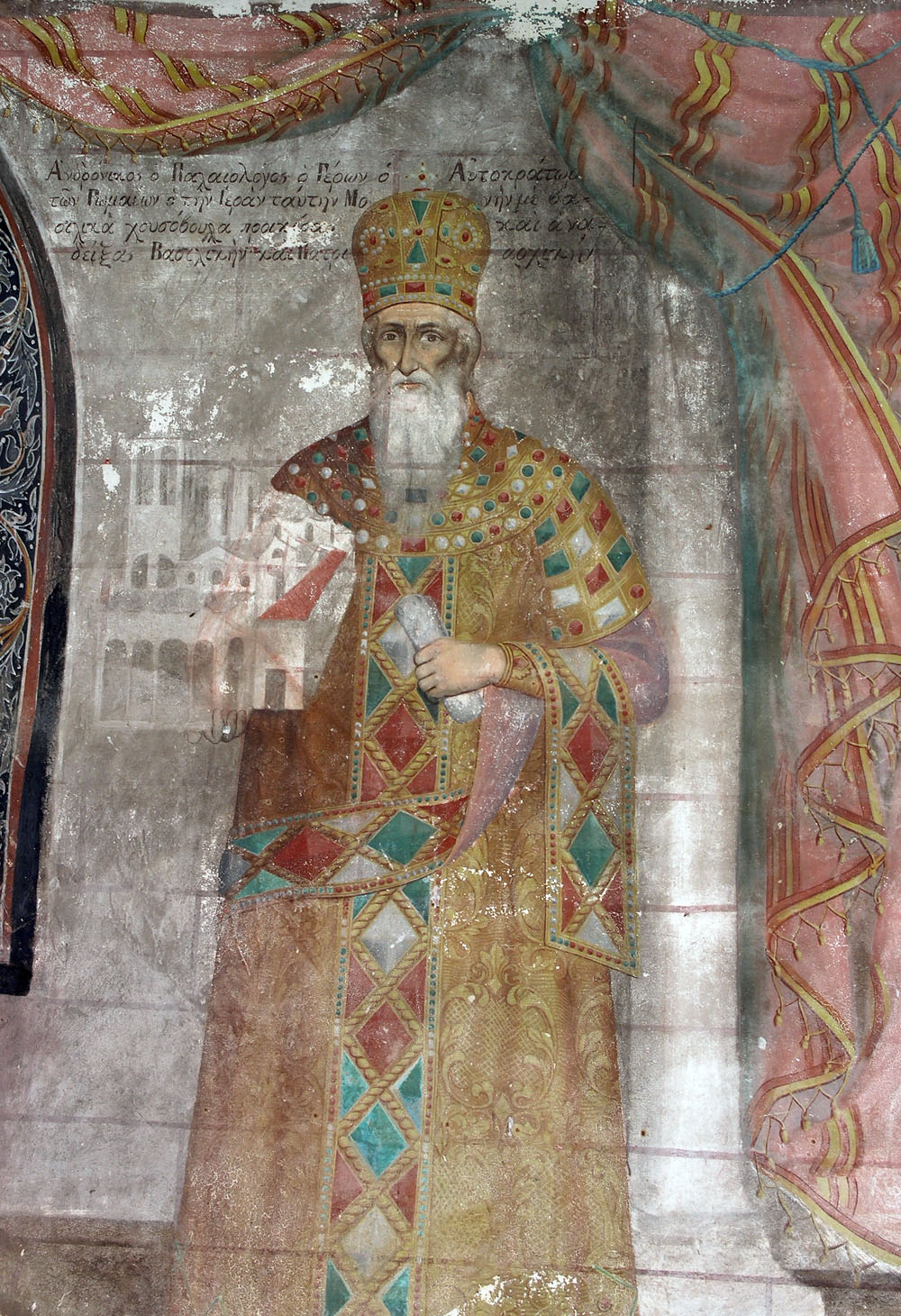
The emperor Andronikos II Palaiologos, a devout but ineffective ruler, surrounded himself with scholars and intellectuals such as Choumnos and his great rival, Theodore Metochites.

Choumnos was born between 1250 and 1255. He came from an already distinguished family, which since the 11th century had provided several high-ranking officials. Nikephoros studied rhetoric and philosophy under the future Patriarch of Constantinople Gregory of Cyprus, and upon conclusion of his studies entered the imperial bureaucracy. He makes his first appearance in history c. 1275, with the lowly rank of quaestor, as head of an embassy to the Mongol Ilkhanid ruler of Persia, Abaqa Khan. Although under Michael VIII Choumnos too had embraced the Union of the Churches, under his successor, the staunchly Orthodox and pious Andronikos II Palaiologos, he recanted. Around 1285, he composed a panegyric in honour of the emperor, duly emphasizing not only his virtues and martial accomplishments, but also his opposition to the Union. Henceforth, his rise in the hierarchy was rapid: in early 1294, following the death of Theodore Mouzalon, Andronikos II named him mystikos (privy councillor) and mesazōn (in effect, chief minister), while in 1295 he also received the office of epi tou kanikleiou, becoming head of the imperial chancellery. As George Pachymeres reports, the emperor increasingly took absence from his administrative duties in order to devote himself to prayer and fasting, leaving Choumnos to effectively handle the governance of the state. Choumnos' growing influence also led to a clash with the deposed patriarch Athanasios I, in whose dismissal in 1293 he may have had a role. Their enmity, which was likely founded on Choumnos' centralizing tendencies and on his classicizing and humanist education, ran deep and was marked by the exchange of mutual accusations of corruption.

In 1303, after a planned marriage of his daughter Eirene to Alexios II failed, and despite the opposition of Empress Irene, he secured his ties to the ruling dynasty by marrying her to the emperor's third son, the despotēs John Palaiologos (c. 1286–1308). Nevertheless, two years later, he was dismissed and replaced as mesazōn by Metochites. During his tenure, he amassed a great fortune, especially estates in Macedonia, through bribes, the selling of offices and tax farming. These practices were quite common among the Palaiologan bureaucracy, whose corrupt administration was especially burdensome on the Empire's subjects. Part of this fortune was used in the establishment and endowment of the monastery of the Theotokos Gorgoepekoos in Constantinople.

In 1309–1310, Choumnos served as governor of the Empire's second-largest city, Thessalonica, but thereafter withdrew from public office. During the 1320s, he engaged in a protracted exchange of polemics with his chief intellectual and political rival, Theodore Metochites. While Choumnos derided his opponent's lack of clarity, Metochites attacked Choumnos' disinterest in physics and his ignorance of astronomy, which he held as the "highest form of science". In c. 1326, Choumnos retired as a monk, under the monastic name Nathanael, to the monastery of Christ Philanthropos in Constantinople, which had been founded by his daughter Eirene. There he died on 16 January 1327.

== Writings ==
Choumnos was a prolific writer, greatly influenced by the Classics, which he had studied as a young pupil. His works, several of which remain unpublished, include rhetorical pieces, such as the eulogy to Andronikos II, as well as treatises on philosophy, especially on elemental theory, meteorology, cosmology and theology. Several of these treatises often appear to have been composed on the occasion of literary gatherings within the court, sometimes with the emperor presiding. From his extensive correspondence, 172 letters survive.

In his philosophical works, Choumnos proves himself an "ardent and skillful" defender of Aristotle. Nevertheless, he does not embrace Aristotelianism, but is rather interested to provide a rigidly rational philosophical justification for the doctrines held by Christian theology. In his attacks on the Platonic theories of substance and forms or in his refutation of Plotinus' theories on the soul, Choumnos tries to prove Christian theological teaching.

According to the French Byzantinist Rodolphe Guilland, "by his love of antiquity, passionate, although a little servile, and by the variety of his knowledge Choumnos heralds Italian humanism and the western Renaissance."

== Family ==
Nikephoros' brother Theodore was also a court official. From his marriage to an unknown wife, Choumnos had several children:

- John Choumnos, parakoimōmenos (chamberlain) and general.
- George Choumnos, epi tēs trapezēs (head of the imperial table) and megas stratopedarchēs (grand master of the camp).
- Irene Choumnaina, married the despotēs John Palaiologos. Following his death in 1308, and having no children, she became a nun by the name of Eulogia, and founded the monastery of Christ Philanthrōpos in Constantinople. Despite her retreat into the convent, she remained very active in the intellectual life of the capital, maintaining a large library, commissioning copies of manuscripts, as well as conversing and corresponding with scholars.

== Sources ==
- Angelov, Dimiter (2007). Imperial ideology and political thought in Byzantium (1204–1330). Cambridge University Press. ISBN 978-0-521-85703-1.
- Boojamra, John Lawrence (1993). The Church and social reform: the policies of Patriarch Athanasios of Constantinople. Fordham University Press. ISBN 978-0-8232-1335-1.
- Cavallo, Guglielmo (1997). The Byzantines. University of Chicago Press. ISBN 978-0-226-09792-3.
- Craig, Edward (1998). Routledge Encyclopedia of Philosophy. Taylor & Francis. ISBN 978-0-415-07310-3.
- Ierodiakonou, Katerina; Bydén, Börje (2008). "Byzantine Philosophy". Stanford Encyclopedia of Philosophy. Stanford University.
- Kazhdan, Alexander, ed. (1991). The Oxford Dictionary of Byzantium. Oxford and New York: Oxford University Press. ISBN 0-19-504652-8.
- Moutafakis, Nicholas J. (2003). Byzantine philosophy. Hackett Publishing. ISBN 978-0-87220-563-5.
- Nicol, Donald M. (1993) [1972]. The Last Centuries of Byzantium, 1261–1453 (Second ed.). Cambridge: Cambridge University Press. ISBN 978-0-521-43991-6.
- Necipoğlu, Nevra (2001). Byzantine Constantinople: monuments, topography, and everyday life. BRILL. ISBN 978-90-04-11625-2.
- Ševčenko, Ihor (1962). Études sur la polémique entre Théodore Métochite et Nicéphore Choumnos (in French). Brussels: Éditions de Byzantion.
- Vasiliev, Alexander A. (1958). History of the Byzantine Empire, 324–1453. University of Wisconsin Press. ISBN 978-0-299-80926-3.
- Verpeaux, Jean (1959). Nicéphore Choumnos. homme d'état et humaniste Byzantin (ca 1250/1255-1327) (in French). Paris: A. et J. Picard.
