= John Petraliphas =

John Petraliphas (Greek: Ἰωάννης Πετραλίφας) was a Byzantine noble and governor of Thessaly and Macedonia in the late 12th/early 13th century with the rank of sebastokrator.

== Biography ==
John was a member of the Petraliphas family, which was of Italo-Norman origin. According to the hagiography of his daughter, Theodora of Arta, John was married to a woman called Helena, from an unspecified noble house of Constantinople, and after being raised to the very high rank of sebastokrator, was dispatched by Byzantine emperor Isaac II Angelos (r. 1185–1195 and 1203–1204) to govern Thessaly and Macedonia. Nevertheless, in 1195, he was among the leading nobles who conspired and overthrew Isaac II and installed Alexios III Angelos (r. 1195–1203) in his place.

After 1204, when Constantinople fell to the Fourth Crusade, he supported the ruler of Epirus Theodore Komnenos Doukas, to whom his sister Maria was married. He died probably sometime between 1224 and 1230. Some authors (Donald Nicol and Demetrios Polemis) have equated him with another John Petraliphas, who was a megas chartoularios in the employ of the Empire of Nicaea circa 1237, but this identification is most likely false.

== Family ==
From his marriage, John had several children. The hagiography records several sons, but only one son and two daughters are known by name:

- Theodore Petraliphas, he married a daughter of Demetrios Tornikes, one of the leading ministers of John III Vatatzes of Nicaea (r. 1221–1254). Theodore defected to Nicaea in 1252/1253, only to defect back to Epirus a short while later.
- Theodora, she was wed as a child to Michael II Komnenos Doukas (r. 1231–1266/68), and was later canonized as Saint Theodora of Arta.
- Maria, she married a member of the Sphrantzes family and later widowed. The parakoimomenos Gabriel Sphrantzes may have been her son. It is also possible that she is the unidentified Petraliphaina reported by George Akropolites to have married Alexios the Slav, a cousin of Boril of Bulgaria and vassal of the Latin emperor Henry of Flanders.

== Sources ==
- Kazhdan, Alexander, ed. (1991). The Oxford Dictionary of Byzantium. Oxford and New York: Oxford University Press. ISBN 0-19-504652-8.
- Macrides, Ruth (2007). George Akropolites: The History. Oxford: Oxford University Press. ISBN 978-0-19-921067-1.
- Talbot, Alice-Mary (1996). "A Saintly Empress: Saint Theodora of Arta" (PDF). Holy Women of Byzantium: Ten Saints' Lives in English Translation. pp. 323–333. ISBN 0-88402-241-2.
- Trapp, Erich; Beyer, Hans-Veit; Walther, Rainer; Sturm-Schnabl, Katja; Kislinger, Ewald; Leontiadis, Ioannis; Kaplaneres, Sokrates (1976–1996). Prosopographisches Lexikon der Palaiologenzeit (in German). Vienna: Verlag der Österreichischen Akademie der Wissenschaften. ISBN 3-7001-3003-1.
