= Irene Choumnaina =

Byzantine basilissa, abess and intellectual

- Basilissa
- Born: 1291
- Died: c. 1355
- Spouse: John Palaiologos
- House: Palaiologos (by marriage)
- Father: Nikephoros Choumnos
- Mother: Unknown
- Religion: Eastern Orthodoxy

Irene Choumnaina or Irene Choumnaina Palaiologina (Greek: Ειρήνη Χούμναινα Παλαιολογίνα; 1291–c. 1355) was a Byzantine basilissa, scholar, monastic founder, abbess, and theologian, who would take the monastic name of Eulogia (Greek: Ευλογία).

== Biography ==
=== Early life ===
Born in 1291, she was the daughter of the influential scholar and prominent official Nikephoros Choumnos. Little is known about her mother aside from her devotion to Christianity. Irene was to be wed to the nephew of Alexios II of Trebizond by Byzantine Emperor Andronikos II in 1299, and for the occasion she was given the title of despotissa. However, after the plan for the marriage failed, Irene was instead married to the Despot John Palaiologos (the son of Andronikos II and Irene of Montferrat) in Easter 1303, at 12 years old. As the wife of a despot, she was entitled empress (basilissa), a title of which she was very proud of and retained for the rest of her life.

=== Monastic and intellectual life ===
Widowed in 1307 at age 16, she was devastated and withdrew into isolation. After a period of seclusion, she wished to become a nun under the influence of Theoleptos of Philadelphia, who was her spiritual advisor. (Note: The majority of Theoleptos' 23 speeches survive through their correspondence.) Under his influence, she took the veil under the name Eulogia and devoted a large part of her fortune in helping the poor, ransoming prisoners of war, and in establishing the Monastery of Christ Philanthropos in Constantinople, which she also entered and administered in 1308, after Theoleptos performed the tonsure ceremony.

After the death of Theoleptos in 1322, she continued his legacy and commissioned copies of his letters and monastic orations. An unknown younger monk from Thessaloniki became her spiritual guide for 12 months between 1334-1335, (Note: The texts of 22 letters (14 from him and 8 from Eulogia) have survived from their correspondence, mainly regarding ancient Greek literature and philosophy.) but otherwise she remained without a spiritual guide for a decade or more, until Gregory Akindynos (Note: whom she sheltered while he was on the run.) filled that role. She remained active in the intellectual life of the capital, maintaining a large library, commissioning copies of manuscripts, and corresponding with scholars of the time.

Her friend and fellow student of Theoleptos, Matthew of Ephesus, commended her as such for her spiritual and intellectual achievements:

You have become a paradigm of virtue to both women and men. [...] a reminder of the highest philosophy and endurance.

Her other friend, Nikephoros Gregoras, described her as a "true princess" in character and wisdom and a "true basilissa".

=== Involvement in the Hesychast controversy and death ===
As a Palaiologos by marriage, she was against the rebellion of John Kantakouzenos and held an anti-Palamite stance during the Second Palaiologan Civil War. The leader of the Hesychasts, Gregory Palamas, described her as a "small woman, invested with some authority", who behaved as if she were a real empress. She was possibly condemned for her Akindynist and anti-Palamite stance in 1351 by the Fifth Council of Constantinople. In late 1355, she became gravely ill and her final act was to make over some inherited land in Macedonia into a monastery. She died soon afterwards at the age of 65.

== Bibliography ==
- Brombin, Alessia (2024). "Hesychast Prayer and Ascetic Virtue in Theoleptos of Philadelphia and Gregory Palamas: A Comparative Exploration". Dialogue. 8 (17). Sulkhan-Saba Orbeliani University.
- Cavallo, Guglielmo (1997). The Byzantines. University of Chicago Press. ISBN 978-0-226-09792-3.
- Juan López, Juan Bautista (2024). Manuel Gabalas: Biography, Intellectual Network, Works and Thought. Department of Medieval Studies of the Central European University Private University, Vienna.
- Nicol, Donald M. (1994). "Eirene-Eulogia Choumnaina Palaiologina, princess and abbess, died c. 1355". The Byzantine Lady: Ten Portraits, 1250-1500. Cambridge University Press. ISBN 978-0-521-45531-2.
- Nicol, Donald M. (1993) [1972]. The Last Centuries of Byzantium, 1261–1453 (Second ed.). Cambridge: Cambridge University Press. ISBN 978-0-521-43991-6.
- Necipoğlu, Nevra (2001). Byzantine Constantinople: monuments, topography, and everyday life. BRILL. ISBN 978-90-04-11625-2.
- Trapp, Erich (2001). Prosopographisches Lexikon der Palaiologenzeit. Austrian Academy of Sciences. ISBN 978-3700130031.
- Vasilopoulou, Nausika B. (2016). The Imperial Arranged Marriages During the Palaiologan Period (1258–1453). A Political Approach (Thesis). National and Kapodistrian University of Athens. Department of History and Archaeology.
- Palmer, G.E.H.; Sherrard, Philip; Ware, Kallistos, eds. (1995). The Philokalia: The Complete Text, Volume 4; Compiled by St. Nikodimos of the Holy Mountain & St. Markarios of Corinth. Faber and Faber. ISBN 9780571193820.
- Talbot, Alice-Mary (1991). "Theoleptos". In Kazhdan, Alexander (ed.). The Oxford Dictionary of Byzantium. New York and Oxford: Oxford University Press. pp. 2056–2057. ISBN 978-0-19-504652-6.
