= Siege of Constantinople (1260) =

1260 Nicaean siege of Constantinople

Coordinates: 41.0167°N 28.9769°E

- Part of the Nicaean–Latin wars
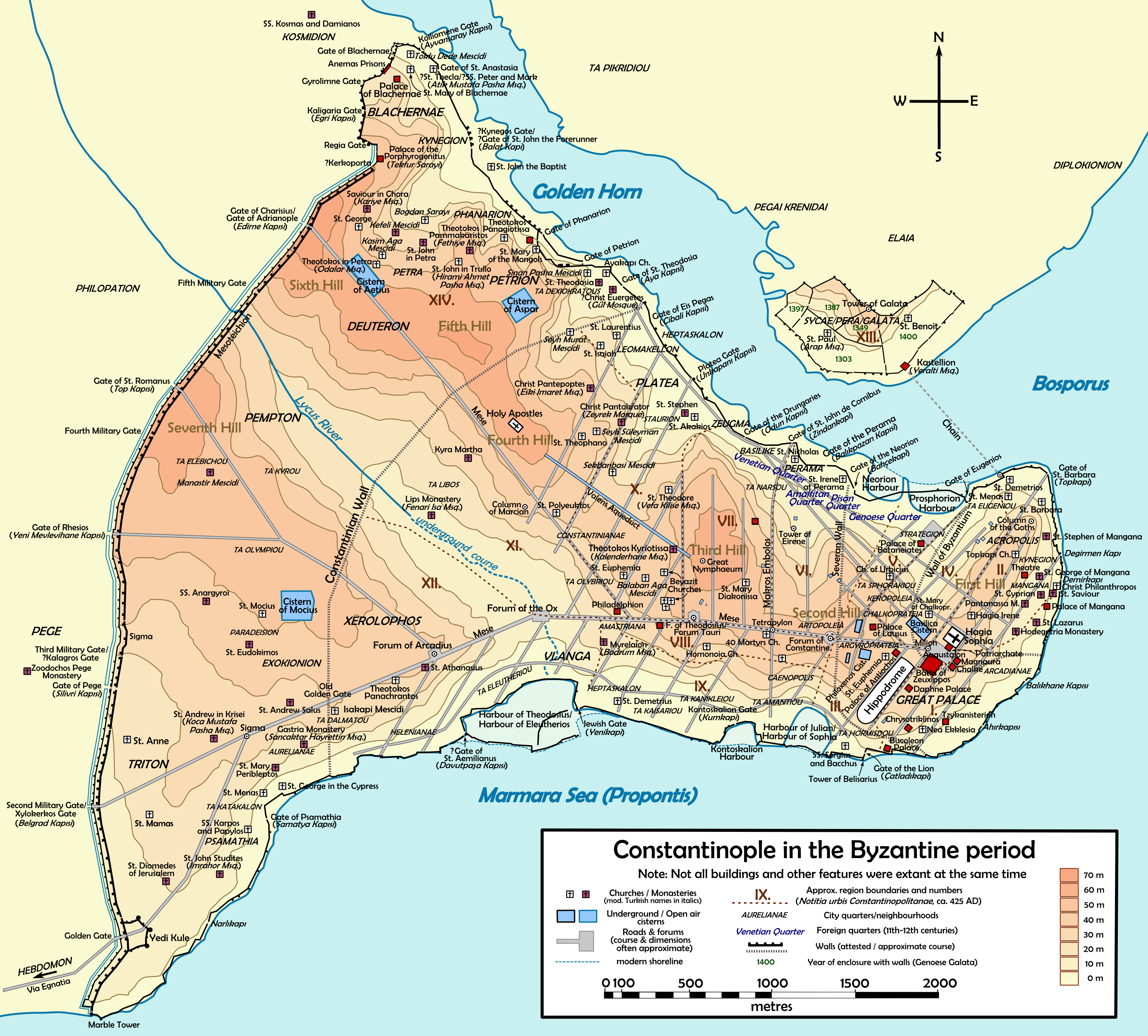
- Map showing Constantinople and its walls during the Byzantine era
Date	1260
Location	Constantinople, Latin Empire (modern-day Istanbul, Turkey)
Result	Latin victory

Belligerents
Empire of Nicaea	Latin Empire

Commanders and leaders
Michael VIII	Baldwin II

Strength
Unknown	Unknown

Casualties and losses
Unknown	Unknown

The siege of Constantinople in 1260 was the failed attempt by the Nicene Empire, the major remnant of the fractured Byzantine Empire, to retake Constantinople from the Latin Empire and re-establish the City as the political, cultural and spiritual capital of a revived Byzantine Empire.

== Background ==
Following the Sack of Constantinople by the Fourth Crusade in April 1204, the Byzantine Empire was divided among Latin Crusader states and a few Byzantine Greek remnants, the chief of which were the Despotate of Epirus in western Greece and Albania, and the Nicaean Empire in western and northwestern Asia Minor. Both of the latter claimed to represent the legitimate Empire, and in view of the weakness of the Latin Empire, vied for the recovery of Constantinople. At first it seemed as if the city would fall to Epirus, whose ruler Theodore Komnenos Doukas crowned himself emperor at Thessalonica in 1225/1227. Epirote power however was broken at the Battle of Klokotnitsa in 1230 against Bulgaria.

Thus the path opened up for Nicaea, under John III Doukas Vatatzes (r. 1221–1254), to intervene in Europe. Allied with the Bulgarians, Vatatzes established a first foothold in Thrace in 1234. Together with the Bulgarians, he then undertook an unsuccessful siege of the city in 1235–6. Thereafter, the Nicaean ruler switched his aim to increasing his territory in Europe. Under Vatatzes, the Nicaeans seized most of Thrace and Macedonia from Epirus and Bulgaria, becoming the strongest state of the region. Reduced to Constantinople and the territory immediately surrounding it, surrounded on east and west by Nicaea and without sufficient funds to attract any armed support, the Latin Empire seemed ripe for the taking by the time of Vatatzes' death. Even the papacy seemed willing to accept the inevitable in exchange for concessions in theological matters and the question of papal primacy. The Latin Empire gained a short reprieve with Vatatzes' death, as his son and successor Theodore II Laskaris (r. 1254–1258) was forced to confront numerous attacks on his territories in the Balkans.

Soon after Theodore II's death, the ambitious Michael VIII Palaiologos (r. 1259–1282) ascended the throne, at first ostensibly as guardian of the infant John IV Laskaris (r. 1259–1261). At this juncture, a coalition of Nicaea's enemies was formed, comprising Epirus, the Principality of Achaea, and the Kingdom of Sicily. The alliance however was dealt a crushing blow at the Battle of Pelagonia in summer 1259. With his chief enemies either dead, in captivity or temporary exile after Pelagonia, Palaiologos was free to turn his sight towards Constantinople.

== Siege ==
After wintering in Lampsacus, in January 1260 Palaiologos crossed the Hellespont with his army and headed towards Constantinople. The accounts of the Byzantine chroniclers on the subsequent events however differ greatly with each other.

According to the account of George Akropolites, the emperor relied on the promises of treason of a certain Latin noble "Asel" (variously identified either with Ansel de Toucy or Ansel de Cahieu), who owned a house adjacent to the city walls and had promised to open up a gate to the Nicaean troops. Consequently, the expedition was not large enough for a serious assault on the city. Michael led his men to encamp at Galata, ostensibly preparing to attack the fortress of Galata on the northern shore of the Golden Horn, while he awaited Asel's treason. Asel however did not act, and claimed that his keys had been taken by the city's ruler. Akropolites then says that Michael obtained a one-year truce and abandoned the siege.

The other chroniclers (George Pachymeres, Nikephoros Gregoras, and others) present the expedition in a very different light, as a large-scale undertaking, with a determined and prolonged effort against the city itself. It involved a preliminary campaign to isolate the city by capturing the outlying forts and settlements controlling the approaches, as far as Selymbria (some 60 km from the city), as well as a direct assault on Galata. This was a large-scale affair, supervised personally by Michael from a conspicuous elevated place, with siege engines and attempts at undermining the wall. Galata however held due to the determined resistance of its inhabitants and the reinforcements shipped over from the city in rowboats. In the face of this, and worried by news of imminent relief for the besieged, Michael lifted the siege.

The difference in the two accounts is attributed by modern scholars to Akropolites' known tendency to minimize the failures of Michael VIII. The two narratives, which both feature an attempt against Galata, are clearly referring to the same event, and the plot of Asel may indeed reflect a genuine episode of the siege which was given undue prominence by Akropolites.

== Aftermath ==
In August 1260, an armistice was signed between Michael VIII and Baldwin II for the duration of one year (until August 1261). Although the siege failed, Michael VIII set about making plans for another try. In March 1261, he negotiated with the Republic of Genoa the Treaty of Nymphaeum, which gave him access to their warfleet in exchange for trading rights. The treaty also functioned as a defense pact between the two states against the Republic of Venice, Genoa's main antagonist and the major supporter of the Latin Empire. However, Michael's preparations were rendered redundant, as on 25 July 1261, an advance force sent to scout the city's environs, headed by Alexios Strategopoulos, managed to penetrate the city under the cover of darkness and retake it from the Latins.

== Bibliography ==
- Angold, Michael (1999), "Byzantium in exile", in Abulafia, David (ed.), The New Cambridge Medieval History: Volume V, c. 1198–c. 1300, Cambridge University Press, pp. 543–568, ISBN 0-521-36289-X
- Bartusis, Mark C. (1997), The Late Byzantine Army: Arms and Society 1204–1453, University of Pennsylvania Press, ISBN 0-8122-1620-2
- Fine, John V. A. (1994) [1987]. The Late Medieval Balkans: A Critical Survey from the Late Twelfth Century to the Ottoman Conquest. Ann Arbor, Michigan: University of Michigan Press. ISBN 978-0-472-10079-8.
- Geanakoplos, Deno John (1959). Emperor Michael Palaeologus and the West, 1258–1282: A Study in Byzantine-Latin Relations. Cambridge, Massachusetts: Harvard University Press.
- Jacoby, David (1999), "The Latin empire of Constantinople and the Frankish states in Greece", in Abulafia, David (ed.), The New Cambridge Medieval History: Volume V, c. 1198–c. 1300, Cambridge University Press, pp. 525–542, ISBN 0-521-36289-X
- Kazhdan, Alexander, ed. (1991). Oxford Dictionary of Byzantium. Oxford University Press. ISBN 978-0-19-504652-6.
- Macrides, Ruth (2007), George Akropolites: The History - Introduction, translation and commentary, Oxford University Press, ISBN 978-0-19-921067-1
- Nicol, Donald M. (1993) [1972]. The Last Centuries of Byzantium, 1261–1453 (Second ed.). Cambridge: Cambridge University Press. ISBN 978-0-521-43991-6.
- George Ostrogorsky, History of the Byzantine State, Rutgers University Press, 1968.
