= Demetrios Chrysoloras =

Demetrios Chrysoloras (Greek: Δημήτριος Χρυσολωρᾶς; fl. 1403–1416) was a Byzantine politician and writer, who served under emperors Manuel II Palaiologos and John VII Palaiologos.

== Life and works ==
Born in the noble Chrysoloras family, his relationship with the more famous Manuel Chrysoloras is unclear. He was friends with Manuel II and from 1403 to 1408 he served as mesazōn in Thessaloniki, under John VII Palaiologos. The last datable event of his life is his participation in the synod that elected Patriarch Joseph II (1416). However, Vasilios Pasiourtides argued that he could have survived Manuel II (d. 1425).

Unlike Manuel Chrysoloras, Demetrios Chrysoloras was firmly against the Church union and wrote against the Latins, Thomism and Demetrios Kydones. He was in epistolary contact with Manuel II and the distinguished scholar John Chortasmenos.

Among his surviving works are six speeches for the festivals of Orthodoxy; a praise of St Demetrios, which he wrote during his time in Thessaloniki; a short treatise on the Hodegetria; two panegyrics to Manuel II, one of which in the form of an epistolary collection, and the other being a long letter that compares Manuel II to the ancient rulers of Rome; a dialogue against Kydones and Thomas Aquinas. While at Thessaloniki, he also composed the preambles for two acts issued by John VII. Many of his works are still unedited.

== Bibliography ==
- Cammelli, G. (1941). I dotti bizantini e le origini dell'Umanesimo. Vol. I. Manuele Crisolora. Florence: Vallecchi.
- Crisolora, D. (1984). Conti Bizzarro, F. (ed.). Cento epistole a Manuele II Paleologo. Naples: D'Auria.
- Dennis, G. T., ed. (1977). The Letters of Manuel II Palaeologus. Corpus Fontium Historiae Byzantinae, 8. Dumbarton Oaks: Centre for Byzantine Studies.
- Dessilani, M. (2024). "Demetrio Crisolora, Discorso su San Demetrio (BHG 545): Edizione critica, con una prima biografia dell'autore e uno studio delle fonti". Jahrbuch der österreichischen Byzantinistik. 74: 117–179. doi:10.1553/joeb74s117.
- Dessilani, M. (2025). "Two Chrysobulls That Demetrios Chrysoloras Wrote". Parekbolai. 15: 121–137. doi:10.26262/par.v15i1.10375.
- Γουρουνά, Μ. (2024). Δημητρίου Χρυσολωρά Σύγκρισις παλαιῶν ἀρχόντων καὶ νέου, τοῦ νῦν αὐτοκράτορος: Κριτική έκδοση με εισαγωγή και σχόλια. Μεταπτυχιακή διδακτορική εργασία (in Greek). Ιωάννινα: Πανεπιστήμιο Ιωαννίνων. Φιλοσοφική Σχολή. doi:10.26268/heal.uoi.18215.
- Hunger, H., ed. (1969). Johannes Chortasmenos (ca. 1370—ca. 1436–37). Briefe, Gedichte und kleine Schriften. Wiener Byzantinistische Studien, 7. Wien: H. Böhlaus.
- Λάμπρος, Σ. Π. (1926). "[Δημητρίου τοῦ Χρυσολωρᾶ] Σύγκρισις παλαιῶν ἀρχόντων καὶ νέου, τοῦ νῦν αὐτοκράτορος [Μανουὴλ Παλαιολόγου]". In Βογιατζίδης, Ι. Κ. (ed.). Παλαιολόγεια καὶ Πελοποννησιακά (in Greek). Vol. III. Athens: [n.d.] pp. 222–245.
- Laurent, V., ed. (1971). Les « Mémoires » du Gran Ecclésiarque de l'Église de Constantinople Sylvestre Syropoulos sur le Concile de Florence (1438–1439). Paris: Éditions du CNRS.
- Pasiourtides, V. (2013). An Annotated Critical Edition Of Demetrios Chrysoloras' Dialogue On Demetrios Kydones' Antirrhetic Against Neilos Kabasilas. University of London: Royal Holloway and Bedford New College.
