= John Choumnos =

John Komnenos Choumnos (Greek: Ἰωάννης Κομνηνός Χοῦμνος, before 1290 – before 1339) was a Byzantine general, scholar and statesman.

He was the eldest son of the scholar and statesman Nikephoros Choumnos. The date of his birth is unknown, however in ca. 1290–1294, when he is known to have fallen ill, he was still very young. Through the influence of his father, he quickly rose in the imperial hierarchy and was named parakoimomenos tou koitonos. He also led Byzantine forces against the Ottoman Turks in Bithynia in 1300–1306, under Michael IX Palaiologos. His campaigns apparently met with some success, since he acquired a reputation for ability in warfare. In 1307 he was promoted one rank to parakoimomenos tes sphendones. In 1308/1309 he married an unknown lady related to the ruling Palaiologos dynasty, with whom he had a son and a daughter. Their names are unknown. His stance in the Byzantine civil war of 1321–1328 is unknown, but his brother George Choumnos appears to have been a partisan of Andronikos II Palaiologos. Like his father, John was a learned man, having studied rhetoric, philosophy and medicine. A collection of his letters survives, as well as a medical treatise on the proper diet for gout. He died sometime between 1332 and 1338, while serving as governor of Chios.

== Sources ==
- Guilland, Rodolphe (1967). Recherches sur les institutions byzantines [Studies on the Byzantine Institutions]. Berliner byzantinische Arbeiten 35 (in French). Vol. I. Berlin and Amsterdam: Akademie-Verlag & Adolf M. Hakkert. OCLC 878894516.
- Kazhdan, Alexander, ed. (1991). The Oxford Dictionary of Byzantium. Oxford and New York: Oxford University Press. ISBN 0-19-504652-8.
- Trapp, Erich; Beyer, Hans-Veit; Kaplaneres, Sokrates; Leontiadis, Ioannis (1994). "30954. Χοῦμνος, Ἰωάννης Κομνηνός". Prosopographisches Lexikon der Palaiologenzeit (in German). Vol. 12. Vienna: Verlag der Österreichischen Akademie der Wissenschaften. ISBN 3-7001-3003-1.
