= Gabriel Sphrantzes =

Gabriel Sphrantzes (Greek: Γαβριήλ Σφραντζῆς, fl. before 1280) was a Byzantine aristocrat and courtier.

Very little is known about him. He was possibly the son of Maria Sphrantzaina, daughter of John Petraliphas and a sister-in-law of Michael II Komnenos Doukas, Despot of Epirus. She was widowed in 1257 and then remarried, first to the governor of Arbanon Constantine Chabaron, and finally to Filippo Chinardo, the Sicilian admiral of Corfu. At some point he served as parakoimomenos of the great seal to Emperor Michael VIII Palaiologos (r. 1259–1282), but was blinded by him sometime before 1280. He is last mentioned in that year, when he accompanied the emperor to Nicomedia, along with his cousin John Doukas.

== Sources ==
- Trapp, Erich; Beyer, Hans-Veit; Walther, Rainer; Sturm-Schnabl, Katja; Kislinger, Ewald; Leontiadis, Ioannis; Kaplaneres, Sokrates (1976–1996). Prosopographisches Lexikon der Palaiologenzeit (in German). Vienna: Verlag der Österreichischen Akademie der Wissenschaften. ISBN 3-7001-3003-1.
