= Peter Aliphas =

Norman knight in the service of the Byzantine Empire

Peter of Aliphas
- House: Petraliphas
- Religion: Christianity

Peter Aliphas was an 11th-century Frankish knight who served first under Robert Guiscard and later under the Byzantine Empire.

== Biography ==
Peter Aliphas is typically identified with the Provençal knight Peter of Aulps although some consider him to be related to Robert of Caiazzo who was also lord of Alife in Southern Italy.

Peter took part in Robert Guiscard's invasion of the Balkan against the Byzantine Empire in 1081. He was the second-in-command to the Count of Brienne who had been assigned to hold the town of Kastoria. The Byzantine Emperor Alexios I Komnenos besieged the town in October 1083 and after storming the gates the Count of Brienne surrendered and Peter among many others entered Byzantine services. Alexios' daughter Anna Komnene later described him as "a glorious warrior in battle and faithful to the emperor".

Peter accompanied the army of the First Crusade during its campaign in Anatolia in the Byzantine contingent of general Tatikios and became governor of Placentia. He left his post in 1098 and met Emperor Alexios together with Stephen of Blois in Philomelium, warning him that a huge army of Turks was approaching, thus making Alexios turn away from relieving the Franks at the siege of Antioch. Peter appeared again in the Balkans in 1107 when he assisted emperor Alexios fighting the invasion of Bohemond of Antioch and was a witness for Alexios to the Treaty of Devol. Peter settled finally in Didymoteichon in Thrace.

== Legacy ==
The descendants of Peter Aliphas became the Petraliphas family, a prominent family in later Byzantine history.
