= George Doukas Philanthropenos =

- Died: before 1452
- Citizenship: Byzantine Empire
- Years active: 1429–1446
- Title: mesazon of the Empire
- Relatives: Patriarch Joseph II of Constantinople

George Doukas Philanthropenos (Greek: Γεώργιος Δούκας Φιλανθρωπηνός; died before 1452) was a close confidant of Byzantine Emperor John VIII Palaiologos (r. 1425–1448) and served briefly as mesazon (chief minister) of the Byzantine Empire in 1438–1439.

He first appears in 1429. John VIII entrusted him with the symbolically important diplomatic missions of conferring the insignia of Despot to the Serbian rulers Đurađ Branković (in 1429 or 1435) and Lazar Branković (in 1446). In 1438–1439 he accompanied John VIII to the Council of Ferrara, and was appointed joint mesazon along with Manuel Iagaris Palaiologos. In this capacity he played an important role, putting pressure on the Byzantine delegation to accept the Union of the Churches.

He was a relative of the Patriarch of Constantinople Joseph II, who died in 1439 during the Council. George left an endowment to the church of Santa Maria Novella in Florence, where Joseph was buried, for an annual mass in his memory.

== Sources ==
- Trapp, Erich; Beyer, Hans-Veit; Walther, Rainer; Sturm-Schnabl, Katja; Kislinger, Ewald; Leontiadis, Ioannis; Kaplaneres, Sokrates (1976–1996). Prosopographisches Lexikon der Palaiologenzeit (in German). Vienna: Verlag der Österreichischen Akademie der Wissenschaften. ISBN 3-7001-3003-1.
