= Fall of Philadelphia =

Siege in Asia Minor (c. 1378–1390)

- Part of the Byzantine–Ottoman wars
Date	1390
Location	Alaşehir, Asia Minor
Result	Ottoman victory

Belligerents
Ottoman Empire supported by: Byzantine Empire	(Byzantine Empire) Philadelphia

Commanders and leaders
(Ottoman Empire) Bayezid I (Byzantine Empire) Manuel II Palaiologos (Byzantine Empire) John VII Palaiologos	Unknown

Strength
Unknown	Unknown

The Fall of Philadelphia in 1390 marked the conquest of the last independent Byzantine city in Asia Minor by the Ottoman Empire. The city was subjected to a siege by the Ottoman forces, which included a Byzantine contingent led by Manuel II Palaiologos and John VII, who were political hostages of Sultan Bayezid I.

== Background ==
After the Siege of Nicomedia in 1337, the city of Philadelphia was the last city in Anatolia to remain under Byzantine rule. Prior to its fall, the city had evaded the fate of other cities, which had fallen to the Anatolian Beyliks, thanks to its location in the Lydian hills, its strong fortifications, and its paying of tribute to the numerous Turkoman raiders and warlords who had threatened the city over the centuries. Although Philadelphia was in theory under the Byzantine Empire, it was situated away from the coast, and in the middle of a vast and oftentimes hostile Ottoman-occupied territory, which made it virtually independent, and more influenced by the Knights of Rhodes.

In the Byzantine civil war of 1373–1379, the Ottomans supported John V Palaiologos in regaining his throne. The Empire however was forced into vassalage, and the emperor's sons, Manuel and John, were sent as political hostages to the court of Bayezid I at Prousa. During that period, Manuel and John were forced to participate in the capture and sacking of many Byzantine cities by the invading Ottomans.

== Battle ==
In 1390, Bayezid summoned his hostages and ordered them to accompany the besieging Ottoman force to Philadelphia. At first, the city refused to surrender to the invading force, but after a short siege, the city surrendered when its citizens saw the Byzantine imperial banner hoisted among the horse-tails of the Pashas, above the camp of the besiegers.
