= Theodora of Arta =

Consort of Epirus and Orthodox saint

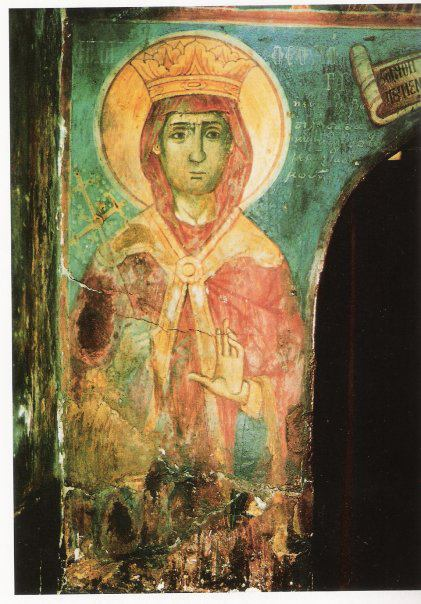
Fresco of Saint Theodora of Arta

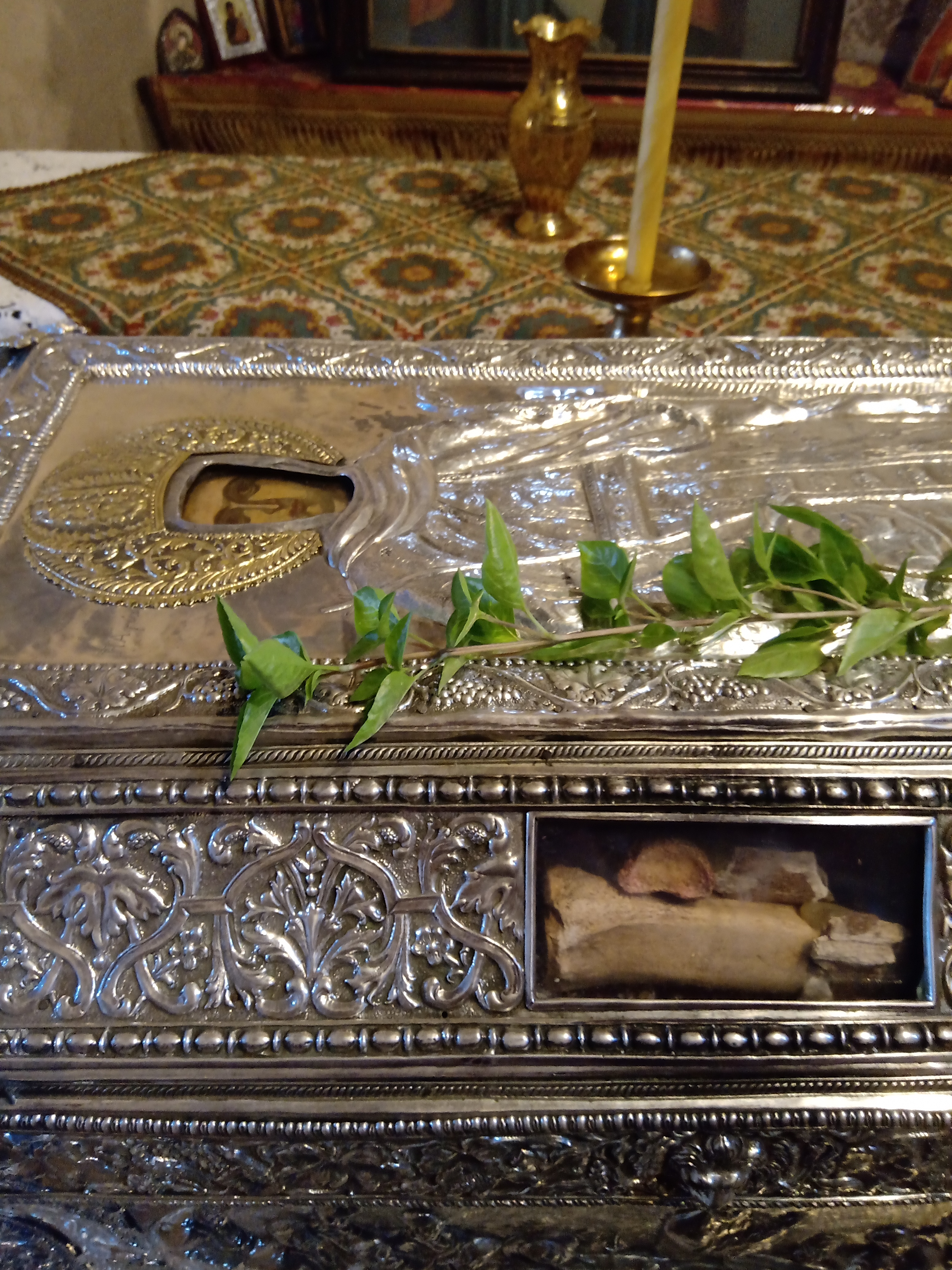
Reliquary of Saint Theodora of Arta

Theodora Petraliphaina (Greek: Θεοδώρα Πετραλίφαινα), canonized as Saint Theodora of Arta (Greek: Αγία Θεοδώρα της Άρτας; ca. 1225 – after 1270), was a consort of Epirus and an Orthodox Christian saint.

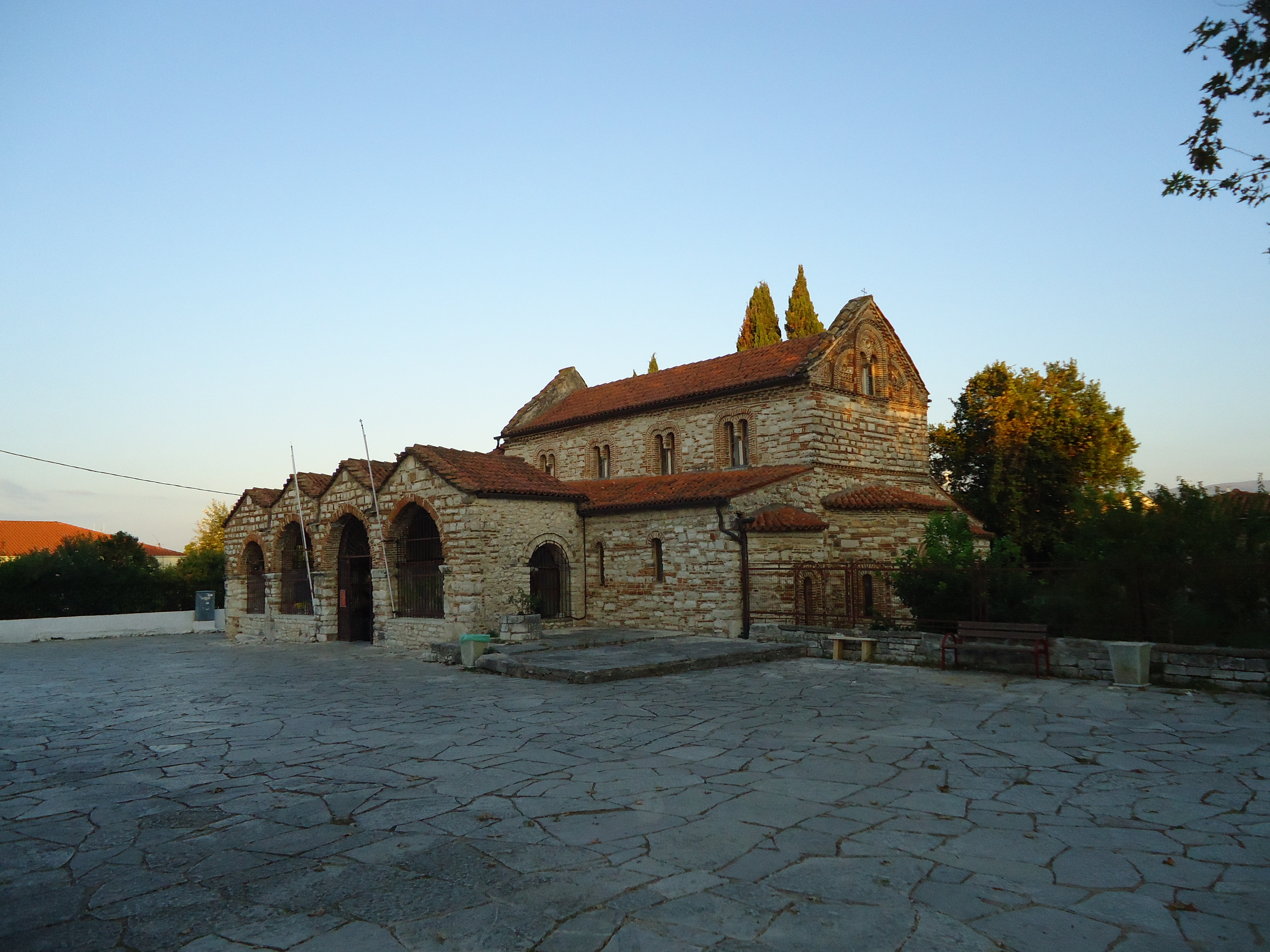
Byzantine church of St Theodora of Arta in Arta, Greece

== Life ==
Her life is known mostly from a short hagiography written by the monk Job, sometimes identified with the late-13th century cleric Job Iasites. In view of the many chronological and genealogical errors however, this identification is open to question.

Theodora was the daughter of the sebastokrator John Petraliphas, governor of Thessaly and Macedonia. She was born in Thessalonica sometime between 1210 and 1216, and married Michael II Komnenos Doukas, the ruler of Epirus and Thessaly shortly after his accession in 1231, while still a child. Despite her being pregnant with Michael's son Nikephoros, she was soon banished from the court by her husband, who preferred to live with his mistress. Living in poverty, she endured her hardship without complaint, sheltered by a priest from the village of Prinista. Her exile lasted for five years, after which Michael repented and called her back to him. The couple thereafter lived together.

As consort of Epirus, Theodora is reported to have favoured closer ties with Epirus' traditional rival for the succession of the Byzantine imperial heritage, the Empire of Nicaea. She is also recorded by the contemporary historian George Akropolites as accompanying her son Nikephoros for his betrothal and later his marriage to Maria, the daughter of the Nicaean emperor Theodore II Laskaris (r. 1254–1258). The rapprochement brought about a settlement of the two realms' ecclesiastical disputes and led to the conferment of the title of despotes on Michael, but did not last long.

Theodora also founded the convent of St. George in the Epirote capital, Arta, where she retired after Michael's death, and where she was buried. It later became known as the Church of St. Theodora, and her tomb became the site of pilgrimage, as many miracles have been attributed to it. She is the patroness saint of Arta, and is commemorated by the Orthodox Church on March 11.

== Family ==
By her marriage with Michael she had six children, including:

- Nikephoros I Komnenos Doukas, who succeeded Michael as ruler of Epirus
- John Doukas
- Demetrios Doukas Komnenos Koutroules
- Helena Angelina Doukaina, who married Manfred of Sicily
- Anna Komnene Doukaina.

== Sources ==
- Kazhdan, Alexander, ed. (1991). Oxford Dictionary of Byzantium. Oxford University Press. ISBN 978-0-19-504652-6.
- Talbot, Alice-Mary (1996). "A Saintly Empress: Saint Theodora of Arta". Holy Women of Byzantium: Ten Saints' Lives in English Translation]. Dumbarton Oaks Research Library and Collection. pp. 323–333. ISBN 0-88402-241-2.

Royal titles
Preceded by Maria Petraliphaina	Despoina consort of Epiros c. 1231–1266/68	Succeeded by Anna Palaiologina Kantakouzene
