= Mesazon =

High dignitary and official during the last centuries of the Byzantine Empire

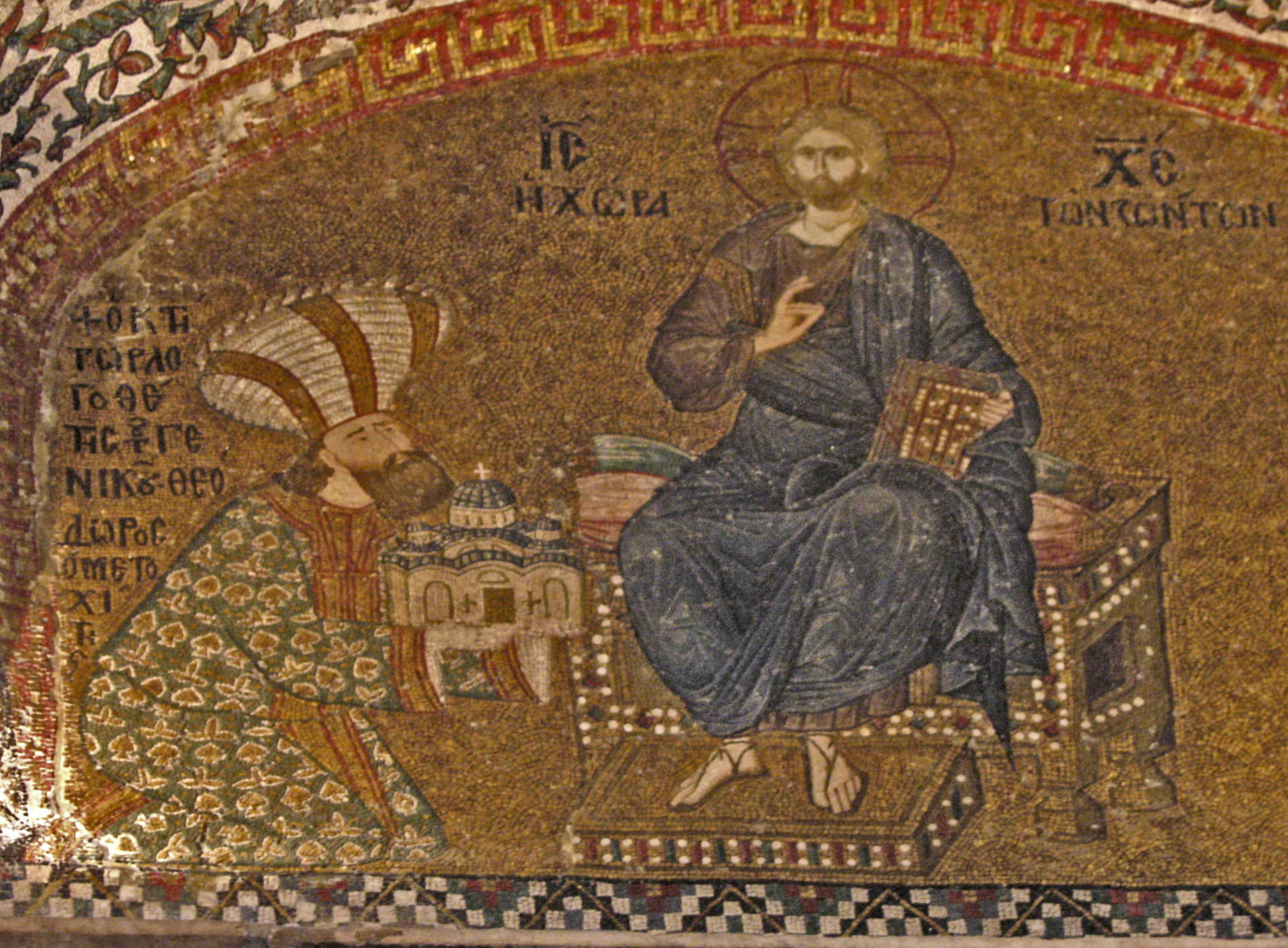
Mosaic portraying Theodore Metochites (left), mesazon to Emperor Andronikos II Palaiologos (r. 1282–1328), presenting the model of the renovated Chora Church to Christ Pantocrator.

The mesazon (Greek: μεσάζων, romanized: mesazōn, lit. 'intermediary') was a high dignitary and official during the last centuries of the Byzantine Empire, who acted as the chief minister and principal aide of the Byzantine emperor. In the West, the dignity was understood as being that of the imperial chancellor (Latin: cancellarius imperii).

== History and functions ==
The term's origins lie in the 10th century, when senior ministers were sometimes referred to as the mesiteuontes (μεσιτεύοντες), i.e. 'mediators' between the emperor and his subjects (cf. paradynasteuon). The title first became official in the mid-11th century, when it was conferred on Constantine Leichoudes, the future ecumenical patriarch of Constantinople. In the Komnenian period, it was awarded to senior government officials who functioned as de facto prime ministers, such as the epi tou kanikleiou and the logothetes ton sekreton, but had not yet acquired a permanent and specific function, nor the power that would characterize it in later years. Rather, it was a title bestowed on the principal imperial secretary of the moment, who acted precisely as an "intermediary" between the emperor and other officials. This reflected the shift of the Byzantine government under the Komnenoi from the old Roman-style bureaucracy to a more restricted, aristocratic ruling class, where government was exercised within the imperial household, as in feudal Western Europe.

The office of mesazon became formally institutionalized in the Empire of Nicaea, where the holder of the mesastikion (as the function had become known), served as the Empire's chief minister, coordinating the other ministers. As the emperor and historian John VI Kantakouzenos (r. 1347–1354) records, the mesazon was "needed by the emperor day and night". This arrangement was inherited by the restored Palaiologan-era Empire and continued in use until the Fall of Constantinople in May 1453. The office was also used in the same function in the Byzantine courts of Epirus, Morea, and Trebizond. In the latter case, it acquired the epithet megas ('great').

== List of mesazontes ==
- Constantine Leichoudes, until 1050.
- Theodore Styppeiotes, under Emperor Manuel I Komnenos (r. 1143–1180).
- John Axouch, under Emperor Manuel I Komnenos
- John Kamateros, under Emperor Manuel I Komnenos.
- Michael Hagiotheodorites, under Emperor Manuel I Komnenos.
- Theodore Maurozomes, under Emperor Manuel I Komnenos.
- Demetrios Komnenos Tornikes, under Emperor John III Vatatzes (r. 1221–1254).
- Theodore Mouzalon, until 1294.
- Nikephoros Choumnos, 1294–1305, under Emperor Andronikos II Palaiologos (r. 1282–1328).
- Theodore Metochites, 1305–1328, under Emperor Andronikos II Palaiologos.
- Alexios Apokaukos, 1328–1345, under Emperors Andronikos III Palaiologos (r. 1328–1341) and John V Palaiologos (r. 1341–1391).
- Demetrios Kydones, 1347–1354, under Emperor John VI Kantakouzenos (r. 1347–1354); 1369–1383 under Emperor John V Palaiologos; 1391–1396 under Emperor Manuel II Palaiologos (r. 1391–1425).
- Demetrios Palaiologos Goudeles, from the late reign of John V Palaiologos to c. 1416 under Manuel II Palaiologos
- Hilario Doria, 1390s–c. 1423, under Manuel II Palaiologos
- Demetrios Chrysoloras, 1403–1408 in Thessalonica under Emperor John VII Palaiologos.
- John Phrangopoulos, 1428/9 in Morea under despot Theodore II Palaiologos
- George Doukas Philanthropenos, 1430–1439.
- Demetrios Palaiologos Kantakouzenos, 1434/5–1448 under Emperor John VIII Palaiologos (r. 1425–1448).
- George Doukas Philanthropenos and Manuel Iagaris Palaiologos, 1438–1439, while accompanying Emperor John VIII Palaiologos to Italy.
- Loukas Notaras, 1434–1453, last mesazōn of the Byzantine Empire under Emperors John VIII Palaiologos and Constantine XI Palaiologos (r. 1449–1453).

== Sources ==
- Angold, Michael (1975). A Byzantine Government in Exile: Government and Society under the Laskarids of Nicaea, 1204–1261. Oxford: Oxford University Press. ISBN 978-0-19-821854-8.
- Bartusis, Mark C. (1997). The Late Byzantine Army: Arms and Society 1204–1453. Philadelphia, Pennsylvania: University of Pennsylvania Press. ISBN 0-8122-1620-2.
- Beck, Hans-Georg (1955). "Der byzantinische "Ministerpräsident"" [The Byzantine 'Prime Minister']. Byzantinische Zeitschrift (in German). 48 (2): 309–338. doi:10.1515/byzs.1955.48.2.309. S2CID 191483710.
- Haldon, John F. (2009). "The State – 1. Structures and Administration". In Jeffreys, Elizabeth; Haldon, John; Cormack, Robin (eds.). The Oxford Handbook of Byzantine Studies. Oxford, United Kingdom: Oxford University Press. ISBN 978-0-19-925246-6.
- Halecki, Oskar (1930). Un Empereur de Byzance à Rome. Warszawa: Towarzystwo Naukowe Warszawskie.
- Kazhdan, Alexander, ed. (1991). The Oxford Dictionary of Byzantium. Oxford and New York: Oxford University Press. ISBN 0-19-504652-8.
- Loenertz, Raymond-Joseph (1960). "Le chancelier impérial à Byzance au XIVe et au XIIIe siècle" [The imperial chancellor in Byzantium in the 14th and 15th century]. Orientalia Christiana Periodica (in French). 26: 275–300.
- Magdalino, Paul (2002) [1993]. The Empire of Manuel I Komnenos, 1143–1180. Cambridge: Cambridge University Press. ISBN 0-521-52653-1.
- Oikonomidès, Nicolas (1985). "La chancellerie impériale de Byzance du 13e au 15e siècle" [The Imperial Chancery of Byzantium from the 13th to the 15th Centuries]. Revue des études byzantines (in French). 43: 167–195. doi:10.3406/rebyz.1985.2171.
- Raybaud, Léon-Pierre (1968). Le gouvernement et l'administration centrale de l'empire byzantin sous les premiers Paléologues (1258-1354) [The government and central administration of the Byzantine Empire under the first Palaiologoi (1258-1354)] (in French). Éditions Sirey.
- Trapp, Erich; Beyer, Hans-Veit; Walther, Rainer; Sturm-Schnabl, Katja; Kislinger, Ewald; Leontiadis, Ioannis; Kaplaneres, Sokrates (1976–1996). Prosopographisches Lexikon der Palaiologenzeit (in German). Vienna: Verlag der Österreichischen Akademie der Wissenschaften. ISBN 3-7001-3003-1.
- Verpeaux, Jean (1955). "Contribution à l'étude de l'administration byzantine: ὁ μεσάζων" [Contribution to the study of Byzantine administration: ὁ μεσάζων]. Byzantinoslavica (in French). 16: 270–296.
