= Council of Philippopolis =

The Council of Philippopolis in 343, 344, or 347 was a result of Arian bishops from the Eastern Roman Empire leaving the Council of Sardica to form their own counter council. In Philippopolis (today's Plovdiv), they anathemized the term homoousios, in effect excommunicating Pope Julius I as well as their rivals at the Council in Sardica (today's Sofia), and introduced the term Anomoian and as a result, the Arian controversy was perpetuated, rather than resolved, as was the original intention of the Roman emperors Constans and Constantius.

== Bibliography ==
- Sacred Texts, Early Church Fathers - Chapter XX Of the Council at Sardica
