= Epi tes trapezes =

The epi tes trapezes (Greek: ὁ ἐπὶ τῆς τραπέζης, lit. 'the one in charge of the table') was a Byzantine court post, responsible for the imperial banquets.

== History ==
The office, more fully known as the domestikos tes basilikes trapezes (δομέστικος τῆς βασιλικῆς τραπέζης, 'Domestic of the imperial table'), epi tes basilikes trapezes (ὁ ἐπὶ τῆς βασιλικῆς τραπέζης) or epi tes trapezes tou despotou (ὁ ἐπὶ τῆς τραπέζης τοῦ δεσπότου, 'the one in charge of the lord's table'), is first mentioned as extant in the mid-7th century, but the source, a hagiography of Maximus the Confessor, is of much later date. It is, however, amply attested in seals from the 8th century on, often holding the offices of koubikoularios or parakoimomenos as well. The epi tes trapezes was responsible for introducing guests to the imperial banquets, waiting to the Byzantine emperor along with the pinkernes, and carrying dishes from the imperial table to the guests. Historical sources, however, show that some holders of the post were entrusted with leading troops or various other special assignments. Like many palace posts involving close access to the Byzantine emperor, it was restricted to eunuchs. There was also the epi tes trapezes tes Augoustes (ὁ ἐπὶ τῆς τραπέζης τῆς Αὐγούστης, 'in charge of the table of the Augusta'), who filled the same duties for the Byzantine empress, and in addition supervised her private barques.

The epi tes trapezes was assisted by a staff, the so-called hypourgia (ὐπουργία), headed by the domestikos tes hypourgias (δομέστικος τῆς ὐπουργίας) and including also secretaries styled notarios tes hypourgias (νοτάριος τῆς ὐπουργίας). The German scholar Werner Seibt proposed that the epi tes trapezes absorbed the main functions of the kastresios, an earlier official with an apparently similar role. Another official with similar duties, the kenarios, is attested only a couple of times during the first decades of the 9th century. Seibt considers him either a subaltern official to the epi tes trapezes or an intermediate stage between the kastresios and the final absorption of his duties into the epi tes trapezes.

From the 13th century on, the epi tes trapezes and the variant domestikos tes trapezes became purely honorary court titles, bereft of any specific duties. In this vein, Nikephoros Gregoras reports that this dignity was allegedly conferred and made hereditary to the princes of Russia from the time of Emperor Constantine the Great (r. 306–337) on.

== Sources ==
- Bury, J. B. (1911). The Imperial Administrative System of the Ninth Century – With a Revised Text of the Kletorologion of Philotheos. London: Oxford University Press. OCLC 1046639111.
- Kazhdan, Alexander, ed. (1991). The Oxford Dictionary of Byzantium. Oxford and New York: Oxford University Press. ISBN 0-19-504652-8.
