= Konostaulos =

Byzantine court title

Konostaulos or konostablos ("constable", in Greek variously κονόσταυλος, κονοσταῦλος or κονόσταβλος), later corrupted to kontostaulos/kontostablos (κοντόσταυλος), was a late Byzantine title, adopted from the Normans. The derivative dignity of megas konostaulos (μέγας κονόσταυλος, "Grand Constable") became one of the highest court posts in the Palaiologan period (1261–1453) and was awarded to high-ranking generals.

== History ==
It was adopted in the 11th century, under influence from the Normans of Sicily, from the French connétable (cf. English "constable"), which in turn derived from the Latin comes stabuli ("count of the stable"). In the 11th–12th centuries, the konostaulos appears to have been a purely honorary title, although it may also have replaced the middle Byzantine komēs tou staulou, the direct descendant of the late Roman comes stabuli, in his functions.

In the last years of the reign of the Nicaean emperor John III Vatatzes (r. 1221–1254), the post of megas konostaulos was created, being the chief of the "Frankish" (i.e. Western European) mercenaries. Its first holder was the future emperor Michael Palaiologos. Thereafter, however, the title appears to have become separated from any particular office and to have become a purely honorary dignity. It ranked quite high in the Palaiologan-era hierarchy, coming ninth in the overall precedence, after the megas primmikerios, and was therefore conferred upon the members of several Byzantine noble families, as well as minor foreign rulers allied to the Byzantine Empire, such as Licario and Leonardo II Tocco. Its distinctive costume is described in the mid-14th century Book of Offices of pseudo-Kodinos: a gold-brocaded brimmed hat (skiadion), a plain silk kabbadion tunic, but without the usual staff of office (dikanikion). For ceremonies and festivities, he bore the domed skaranikon hat, of orange silk and decorated with gold wire embroidery, and with an enameled portrait of the emperor standing in front and another of the emperor enthroned on the rear. The simple title konostaulos continued in use, at least in the Despotate of the Morea, but its functions are unclear.

== List of known megaloi konostauloi ==
Name	Tenure	Appointed by	Notes	Refs
Michael Palaiologos	1253/4 – 1259	John III Vatatzes	He was raised to the rank upon his marriage to the emperor's niece in winter 1253/4. He was relieved of it when he fled to the Turks in summer 1256 but restored on his return in early 1257. Appointed regent and co-emperor to John IV Laskaris in 1259, founder of the Palaiologan dynasty.	
Michael Kantakouzenos	unknown – 1264	Michael VIII Palaiologos	A general of Michael VIII, and ancestor of the Kantakouzenos dynasty. First governor of Monemvasia after its recovery from the Latins, he was killed in a skirmish at Mesiskli in 1263/4.	
Andronikos Tarchaneiotes	1267–1272	Michael VIII Palaiologos	Nephew of Michael VIII, he was raised to the dignity on his marriage to the daughter of John I Doukas of Thessaly, but soon defected to his father-in-law, resulting in renewed hostilities with Byzantium.	
Michael Kaballarios	unknown – 1277	Michael VIII Palaiologos	A general of distinguished birth, he was mortally wounded in the Battle of Pharsalus against John I Doukas of Thessaly.	
Licario	after 1277	Michael VIII Palaiologos	Lombard renegade in Byzantine service, he conquered Euboea and several Aegean islands for the Empire. Raised to the rank of megas doux, he was promoted to the post of megas konostaulos following the death of Kaballarios.	
Michael Doukas Glabas Tarchaneiotes	circa 1297	Andronikos II Palaiologos	One of the most distinguished generals of the Palaiologan era, later raised to protostrator	
Michael Tornikes Komnenos Asan Palaiologos	unknown	Andronikos II Palaiologos	The eldest son of Tsar Ivan Asen III of Bulgaria and cousin of Andronikos II, who esteemed his character and counsel.	
John Synadenos	unknown	Andronikos II Palaiologos or Andronikos III Palaiologos	Son of the megas stratopedarches John Synadenos, a general under Michael VIII. A relatively obscure individual, he is only mentioned in the final stages of the Byzantine civil war of 1321–28, where he acted as envoy of Andronikos III to his grandfather	
Alexios Kabasilas	circa 1339	Andronikos III Palaiologos	An Epirote soldier, he held the fortress of Rogoi against Andronikos III, but was persuaded to surrender it by John Kantakouzenos.	
Michael Monomachos	circa 1343	John V Palaiologos	A partisan of Alexios Apokaukos and an experienced and capable soldier, he was raised to the dignity by Apokaukos during the Byzantine civil war of 1341–1347.	
Isaris	unknown	John V Palaiologos	He is only known as the founder of the New Monastery in Thessalonica, some time before 1376.	
Leonardo II Tocco	1415–1418/9	Manuel II Palaiologos	Younger brother of Carlo I Tocco, he was raised to the title by Manuel II on the same occasion when he conferred the title of despotes to Carlo, and held it until his death. His daughter Theodora Tocco married Constantine XI Palaiologos in 1429, and despite her death shortly after, Sphrantzes reports that Constantine, out of deference to his late father-in-law, refused to name anyone else to the vacant title.	

== Sources ==
- Bartusis, Mark C. (1997). The Late Byzantine Army: Arms and Society 1204–1453. Philadelphia, Pennsylvania: University of Pennsylvania Press. ISBN 0-8122-1620-2.
- Failler, Albert; Laurent, Vitalien (1984). Georges Pachymérès: Relations Historiques, Vol. II. Livres IV–VI (in French). Paris: Société d'édition «Les Belles Lettres». ISBN 2-251-32231-0.
- Geanakoplos, Deno John (1959). Emperor Michael Palaeologus and the West, 1258–1282: A Study in Byzantine-Latin Relations. Cambridge, Massachusetts: Harvard University Press.
- Guilland, Rodolphe (1967). "Le Grand connétable". Recherches sur les institutions byzantines [Studies on the Byzantine Institutions]. Berliner byzantinische Arbeiten 35 (in French). Vol. I. Berlin and Amsterdam: Akademie-Verlag & Adolf M. Hakkert. pp. 469–477. OCLC 878894516.
- Kazhdan, Alexander, ed. (1991). The Oxford Dictionary of Byzantium. Oxford and New York: Oxford University Press. ISBN 0-19-504652-8.
- Macrides, Ruth (2007). George Akropolites: The History. Oxford: Oxford University Press. ISBN 978-0-19-921067-1.
- Trapp, Erich; Beyer, Hans-Veit; Walther, Rainer; Sturm-Schnabl, Katja; Kislinger, Ewald; Leontiadis, Ioannis; Kaplaneres, Sokrates (1976–1996). Prosopographisches Lexikon der Palaiologenzeit (in German). Vienna: Verlag der Österreichischen Akademie der Wissenschaften. ISBN 3-7001-3003-1.
