= Euphrosyne Palaiologina =

Euphrosyne Palaiologina (Greek: Εὐφροσύνη Παλαιολογίνα) can refer to one of several Byzantine women related to the imperial Palaiologos dynasty:

- Euphrosyne Palaiologina, illegitimate daughter of Emperor Michael VIII Palaiologos, wife of Nogai Khan
- Euphrosyne Palaiologina, originally named Jacobine, married a brother of Emperor Manuel II Palaiologos in 1403
- Euphrosyne Komnene Doukaina Palaiologina, daughter of the megas stratopedarches John Synadenos and nun
- Euphrosyne Doukaina Palaiologina, granddaughter of John Synadenos, wife of the protosebastos Constantine Komnenos Palaiologos Raoul
- Euphrosyne Palaiologina Leontarina, daughter of Demetrios Palaiologos Metochites, wife of Demetrios Laskaris Leontares
