= Andronikos Palaiologos (died 1344) =

14th-century Byzantine aristocrat and general

Andronikos Palaiologos (Greek: Ἀνδρόνικος Παλαιολόγος; died July 1344) was a Byzantine aristocrat and military commander during the Byzantine civil war of 1341–47.

Andronikos was the son of Constantine Palaiologos, the governor of Serres, an uncle of Emperor Andronikos III Palaiologos (reigned 1328–41). Andronikos is first mentioned on 19 November 1341, when, on the occasion of the coronation of John V Palaiologos, he was named megas stratopedarches. Soon after, John VI Kantakouzenos, embroiled in a civil war with the regency for the underage John V, promoted him to protostrator and named him as governor of the Rhodope Mountains region and the fortress of Stenimachos. As soon as he reached his province, however, he declared himself for the regency. In this he was influenced by his family ties to one of the regency's leaders, the megas doux Alexios Apokaukos, one of whose daughters he had married. His father likewise transferred his allegiance to the regency at about the same time.

In 1343/4, Apokaukos sent him against Kantakouzenos' loyalists in the area of Didymoteicho. While besieging the fortress of Pythion in July 1344, he drowned in the Hebros river.

== Sources ==
- Guilland, Rodolphe (1967). "Le Protostrator". Recherches sur les institutions byzantines [Studies on the Byzantine Institutions]. Berliner byzantinische Arbeiten 35 (in French). Vol. I. Berlin and Amsterdam: Akademie-Verlag & Adolf M. Hakkert. pp. 478–497. OCLC 878894516.
- Trapp, Erich; Beyer, Hans-Veit; Walther, Rainer; Sturm-Schnabl, Katja; Kislinger, Ewald; Leontiadis, Ioannis; Kaplaneres, Sokrates (1976–1996). Prosopographisches Lexikon der Palaiologenzeit (in German). Vienna: Verlag der Österreichischen Akademie der Wissenschaften. ISBN 3-7001-3003-1.
