= Sphrantzes Palaiologos =

Byzantine aristocrat and commander

Sphrantzes Palaiologos (Greek: Σφραντζῆς Παλαιολόγος) was a Byzantine aristocrat and commander active in the 1330s.

A member of the minor aristocracy and a Senator, in 1334 he was promised great rank and wealth by Emperor Andronikos III Palaiologos if he could capture or otherwise neutralise the renegade Syrgiannes Palaiologos. He posed as a deserter and entered the Serbian camp and killed Syrgiannes, who had deserted to King Stefan Dušan, ending his advance and bringing the Serbian army into disarray. Consequently, in August 1334, the king of Serbia made peace with Andronikos III Palaiologos and allowed his forces to retake control of captured parts of Macedonia.

He was rewarded with the high court rank of megas stratopedarches, which he held until his death of typhus in 1339, leading a campaign in Acarnania.

== Sources ==
- Guilland, Rodolphe (1967). "Le Stratopédarque et le Grand statopédarque". Recherches sur les institutions byzantines [Studies on the Byzantine Institutions]. Berliner byzantinische Arbeiten 35 (in French). Vol. I. Berlin and Amsterdam: Akademie-Verlag & Adolf M. Hakkert. pp. 498–521. OCLC 878894516.
- Trapp, Erich; Beyer, Hans-Veit; Walther, Rainer; Sturm-Schnabl, Katja; Kislinger, Ewald; Leontiadis, Ioannis; Kaplaneres, Sokrates (1976–1996). Prosopographisches Lexikon der Palaiologenzeit (in German). Vienna: Verlag der Österreichischen Akademie der Wissenschaften. ISBN 3-7001-3003-1.
- Verpeaux, Jean, ed. (1966). Pseudo-Kodinos, Traité des Offices (in French). Centre National de la Recherche Scientifique.
