= George Synadenos Astras =

George Synadenos Astras (Greek: Γεώργιος Συναδηνός Ἀστρᾶς; fl. c. 1354 – 1365/6) was a Byzantine official and provincial governor.

In 1354, holding the title of megas stratopedarches, he was entrusted with the renovation of the Hagia Sophia. In 1355 he was named governor of Ainos in Thrace, remaining in the post until c. 1357. In 1360–1364 he was governor of the island of Lemnos, and then of Thessalonica, until his death from the plague sometime before August 1368.

He had estates on Lemnos, some of which were inherited by his son, Michael Synadenos Astras (died 1400), and others which were granted to the Athonite monasteries of Great Lavra, Vatopedi, and Dionysiou. He was related by marriage to Emperor John V Palaiologos, and he was a friend and correspondent of the scholar Demetrios Kydones.

== Sources ==
- Guilland, Rodolphe (1967). "Le Stratopédarque et le Grand statopédarque". Recherches sur les institutions byzantines [Studies on the Byzantine Institutions]. Berliner byzantinische Arbeiten 35 (in French). Vol. I. Berlin and Amsterdam: Akademie-Verlag & Adolf M. Hakkert. pp. 498–521. OCLC 878894516.
- Trapp, Erich; Beyer, Hans-Veit; Walther, Rainer; Sturm-Schnabl, Katja; Kislinger, Ewald; Leontiadis, Ioannis; Kaplaneres, Sokrates (1976–1996). Prosopographisches Lexikon der Palaiologenzeit (in German). Vienna: Verlag der Österreichischen Akademie der Wissenschaften. ISBN 3-7001-3003-1.
