= John Synadenos =

John Synadenos (Greek: Ἰωάννης Συναδηνός) can refer to:

- John Synadenos (megas stratopedarches) (fl. 1277–1310/28), Byzantine nobleman and general
- John Synadenos (megas konostaulos) (fl. 1320s), son of the above, Byzantine nobleman and general
