= John Angelos (protostrator) =

Official of the Empire of Nicaea (died 1258)

John Angelos (Greek: Ἰωάννης Ἄγγελος) was a part of the Komnenos family and was a senior official of the Empire of Nicaea. Of low birth, he was one of the favourites of Emperor Theodore II Laskaris (r. 1254–58), who promoted him to the rank of prōtostratōr in 1255, from the rank of megas primikērios. He died soon after Theodore's death, possibly committing suicide when the nobles under Michael Palaiologos took power.

== Sources ==
- Guilland, Rodolphe (1967). "Le Protostrator". Recherches sur les institutions byzantines, Tome I (in French). Berlin: Akademie-Verlag. pp. 478–497.
- Macrides, Ruth (2007). George Akropolites: The History – Introduction, Translation and Commentary. Oxford: Oxford University Press. ISBN 978-0-19-921067-1.
