= Markos Palaiologos Iagaris =

Markos Palaiologos Iagaris or Iagros (Greek: Μάρκος Παλαιολόγος Ἰάγαρις/Ἴαγρος) was a Byzantine aristocrat and diplomatic envoy.

He first appeared in Constantinople in 1401, and qualified as an oikeios of the emperor. In 1417, he was possibly sent on a diplomatic mission to the Venetians in the Morea. In 1422 and again in 1429, he was sent by Emperor John VIII Palaiologos as an envoy to the Ottoman Sultan Murad II. At the time he had the relatively lowly rank of protovestiarites, but was quickly promoted to protostrator and then to the senior rank of megas stratopedarches, which he held already during his mission in 1430 to Pope Martin V. During his return from the mission to the Pope, on orders from the Emperor, he raised Thomas Palaiologos to the rank of Despot in the Morea. He led two more missions abroad, one in 1433 to Pope Eugene IV, and one in 1438 to Venice.

According to Rodolphe Guilland, he was married to an unnamed lady from the Petraliphas family, and was likely the brother of another high official, Manuel Palaiologos Iagaris.

== Sources ==
- Guilland, Rodolphe (1967). "Le Protostrator". Recherches sur les institutions byzantines, Tome I (in French). Berlin: Akademie-Verlag. pp. 478–497.
- Trapp, Erich; Beyer, Hans-Veit; Walther, Rainer; Sturm-Schnabl, Katja; Kislinger, Ewald; Leontiadis, Ioannis; Kaplaneres, Sokrates (1976–1996). Prosopographisches Lexikon der Palaiologenzeit (in German). Vienna: Verlag der Österreichischen Akademie der Wissenschaften. ISBN 3-7001-3003-1.
