= Theodore Synadenos =

Byzantine governor (c.1277–c.1346)

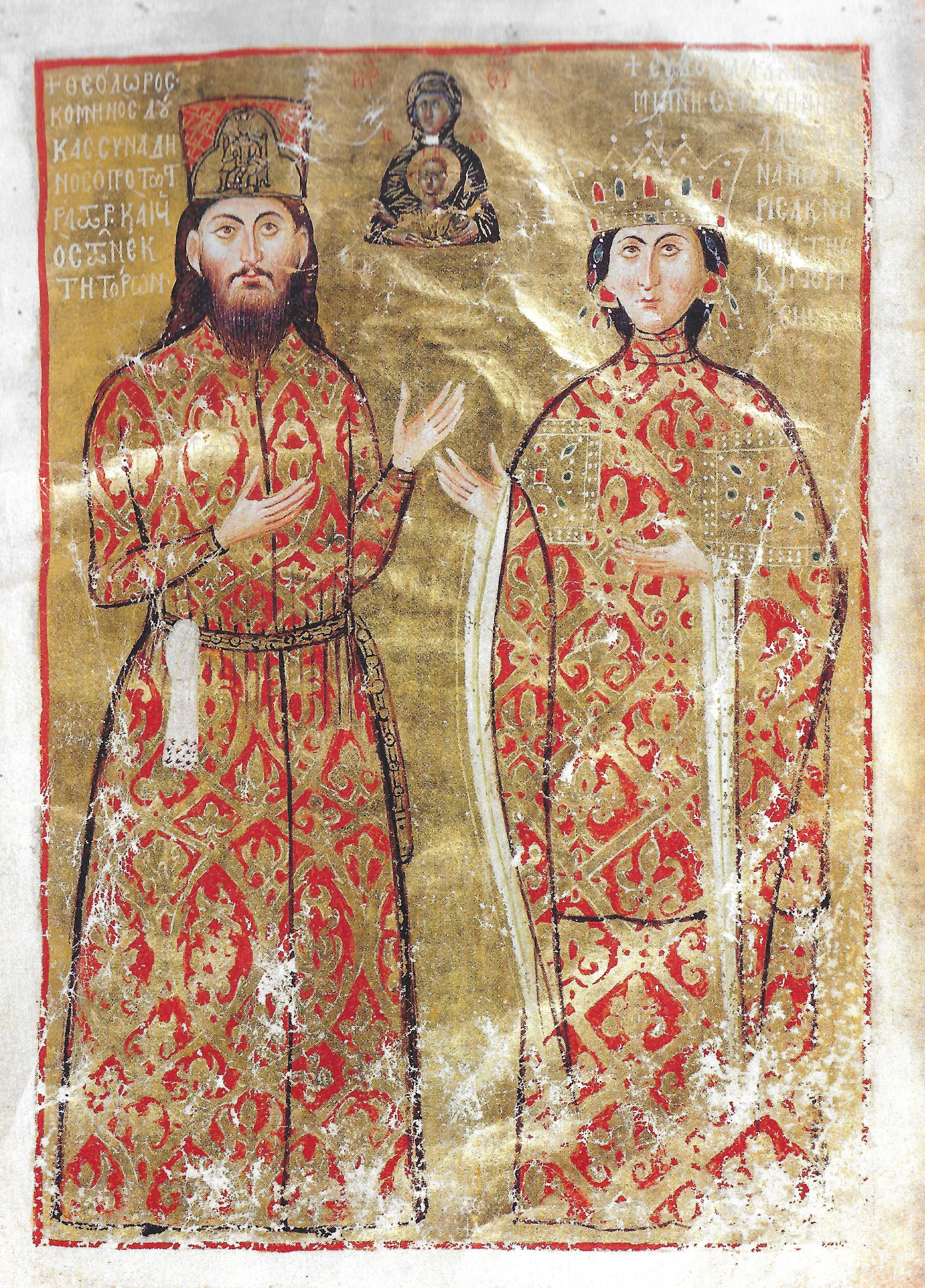
- Theodore Synadenos with his wife, from the Lincoln Typikon
- Born: c. 1277
- Died: 1345/1346
- Military career
- Allegiance: Byzantine Empire
- Service years: before 1320 – 1342
- Rank: protostrator
- Wars: Byzantine civil war of 1321–1328, Byzantine civil war of 1341–1347

Theodore Komnenos Doukas Palaiologos Synadenos (Greek: Θεόδωρος Κομνηνός Δούκας Παλαιολόγος Συναδηνός, ca. 1277 – ca. 1346), usually simply Theodore Synadenos, was a Byzantine magnate, senior official and military leader of the early 14th century, who played an important role in the civil wars of the period. The scion of a noble lineage, he became one of the first and most prominent supporters of Andronikos III Palaiologos in his struggle against his grandfather Andronikos II. Synadenos held various provincial governorships during Andronikos III's reign, including Epirus and Thessalonica. After the outbreak of the civil war of 1341–1347, he tried to surrender Thessalonica to his old friend John Kantakouzenos, but was driven from the city by the Zealots of Thessalonica. Forced to join Kantakouzenos's enemies, he was initially honoured with the high rank of protovestiarios but soon placed under house arrest in Constantinople, where he died impoverished in 1345 or 1346.

== Biography ==
Theodore Synadenos was a son of the megas stratopedarches John Synadenos and Theodora Palaiologina, the niece of Emperor Michael VIII Palaiologos (r. 1259–1282), and hence a member of the Byzantine Empire's highest aristocracy. He had a probably older brother also named John, and at least one sister, Euphrosyne. Little is known about his early life: he was born circa 1277, apparently at Bizye on the Black Sea coast of Thrace, where he had a palatial residence, extensive estates and many friends and relatives.

=== Under Andronikos III ===
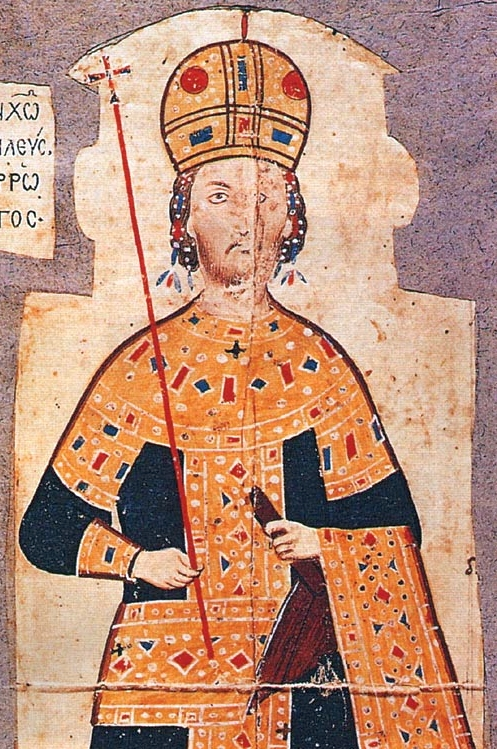
Andronikos III Palaiologos

Synadenos enters the historical record in 1321, when he held the lowly title of domestikos tes trapezes (steward of the imperial table), and is recorded as a close friend to his cousin, the junior emperor Michael IX Palaiologos. After Michael's death, Synadenos became one of the earliest and most important adherents of Michael IX's son, the young Andronikos III (r. 1328–1341). Andronikos had been disinherited by the old emperor, Andronikos II (r. 1282–1328), after Michael's death. Along with the fellow aristocrats John Kantakouzenos and Syrgiannes Palaiologos, Theodore formed the leading "triumvirate" of the younger Andronikos's supporters, to which the "new man" Alexios Apokaukos attached himself as a junior member. The old emperor, distrusting Synadenos' loyalty, named him governor of Prilep, on the border with Serbia. Instead of departing for his assignment, on the night of Easter (19–20 April 1321), Synadenos, along with the younger Andronikos and Kantakouzenos, escaped Constantinople to begin an armed uprising against Andronikos II.

In the first round of the civil war between grandfather and grandson, Andronikos III was successful in getting recognition for himself as junior emperor, with Thrace as his personal appanage. Throughout the conflict, Synadenos was among the most radical and uncompromising supporters of the younger Andronikos, favouring the eventual deposition of Andronikos II. During the course of the war, Synadenos defeated loyalist forces under Constantine Asen, and in the final round of the civil war, in 1327–28, he served as governor in Thrace. As more and more localities, including the Empire's second-most important city, Thessalonica, switched over to Andronikos III's camp, Synadenos along with Kantakouzenos urged Andronikos III to march on Constantinople and depose his grandfather outright. On the night of 13 May 1328, the three men led their army through a gate after bribing its guard, taking possession of the imperial capital without resistance. Andronikos II was forced to resign the throne and retire to a monastery, with his grandson succeeding him as sole emperor. For his services, Synadenos was promoted to protostrator sometime during the civil war, perhaps as early as 1321.

After the war, Theodore Synadenos was rewarded by being made governor of Constantinople, Apokaukos became head of the imperial secretariat, Kantakouzenos remained Andronikos III's principal advisor as megas domestikos, and Syrgiannes was named governor of Thessalonica. Around 1330, Synadenos was sent as governor to Mesembria, while in 1336, after Andronikos III and John Kantakouzenos annexed Epirus, he became its governor. In late 1338, however, a revolt broke out in Epirus in favour of Nikephoros II Orsini, the last descendant of the Epirote ruling dynasty. Synadenos was taken captive in the capital, Arta by the rebels, and remained a prisoner until 1340, when Andronikos III and Kantakouzenos campaigned against the rebels and recovered the region. John Angelos, a relative of Kantakouzenos, was installed as the new governor, while Synadenos was moved to the governorship of Thessalonica.

=== Renewed civil war and death ===
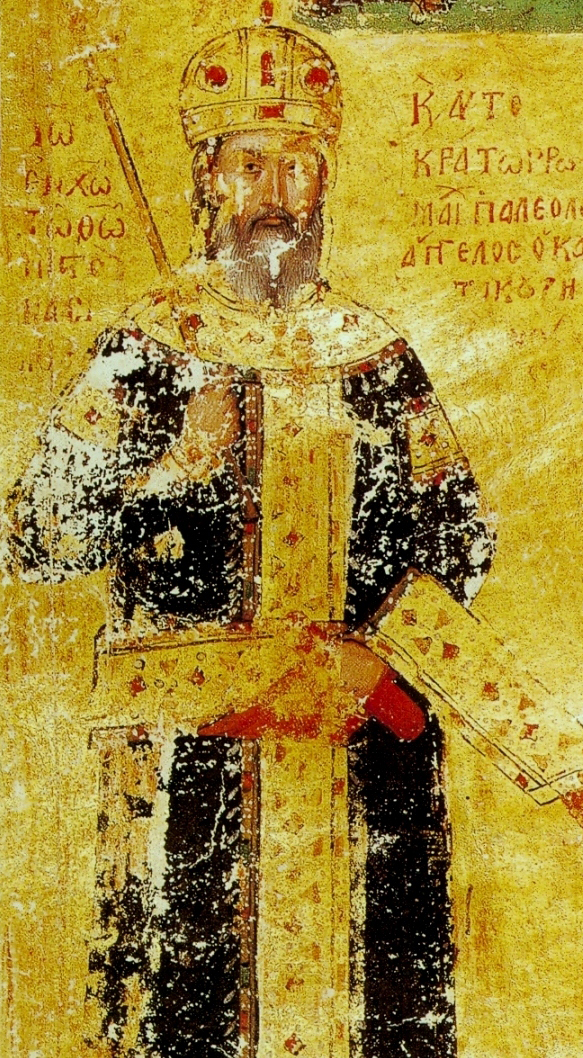
John VI Kantakouzenos

In June 1341, Andronikos III died suddenly, and a power struggle developed between Kantakouzenos, who initially assumed the powers of regency over Andronikos's underage son John V Palaiologos, and a powerful faction around the Patriarch John XIV Kalekas, the Empress-dowager Anna of Savoy and Alexios Apokaukos on the other. The dispute soon developed in outright conflict when the Patriarch, the Empress, and Apokaukos replaced Kantakouzenos as regent and imprisoned his family and supporters. In response, Kantakouzenos proclaimed himself emperor at Didymoteichon in October. The news of Kantakouzenos's proclamation sparked a wave of popular resistance across Macedonia and Thrace. The common people, impoverished by an exploitative and over-powerful aristocracy, viewed Kantakouzenos as a representative of the hated aristocrats and rallied behind the legitimate Palaiologos line and one by one, the cities were seized in the name of the Constantinopolitan regency. Thessalonica at first remained tranquil, and Synadenos contacted his old friend Kantakouzenos with the intention of surrendering the city to him. Such a move might well prove decisive, as possession of Thessalonica would enable Kantakouzenos to control Macedonia, Thessaly and Epirus, and in March 1342, he set out from Didymoteichon with his army in the direction of the city. Before he arrived there, however, Synadenos was overthrown and driven from the city by a rebellion led by a radical popular faction, the Zealots. Apokaukos with a fleet came to reinforce the new regime, and one of his sons was installed as its new governor.

Driven from Thessalonica, with Kantakouzenos's cause seemingly in ruins—he was soon forced to seek refuge in the court of the Serbian king, Stefan Dushan, with whom Theodore was a parent of (Stefan mother, Theodora Smilets, was a first cousin). With his family back in Constantinople in the regency's hands, Synadenos made terms with Apokaukos. He was rewarded with the high rank of protovestiarios, but soon after placed under virtual house arrest in Constantinople. There he died, deprived of his court rank and considerable wealth, in late 1345 or early 1346. A year later, in February 1347, Kantakouzenos entered Constantinople as the victor of the civil war, which had left the Byzantine state in ruins: its human and military resources exhausted, over half of its territory lost, bankrupt and indebted to foreigners, with a war-weary and unenthusiastic populace.

=== Family ===
Some time before 1320, Theodore married Eudokia Doukaina Komnene Palaiologina Synadene, daughter of the epi tou stratou Theodore Doukas Mouzakios, and had two daughters:

- Theodora Komnene Doukaina Raoulaina Palaiologina, who probably married a member of the Raoul family.
- Anna Komnene Doukaina Palaiologina Asanina, who married John Kantakouzenos' brother-in-law, Manuel Asen.

== Sources ==
- Bartusis, Mark C. (1997). The Late Byzantine Army: Arms and Society 1204–1453. Philadelphia, Pennsylvania: University of Pennsylvania Press. ISBN 0-8122-1620-2.
- Guilland, Rodolphe (1967). "Le Protostrator". Recherches sur les institutions byzantines, Tome I (in French). Berlin: Akademie-Verlag. pp. 478–497.
- Kazhdan, Alexander (1991). "Synadenos". In Kazhdan, Alexander (ed.). The Oxford Dictionary of Byzantium. Oxford and New York: Oxford University Press. p. 1990. ISBN 0-19-504652-8.
- Nicol, Donald M. (1993) [1972]. The Last Centuries of Byzantium, 1261–1453 (Second ed.). Cambridge: Cambridge University Press. ISBN 978-0-521-43991-6.
- Polemis, Demetrios I. (1968). The Doukai: A Contribution to Byzantine Prosopography. London: The Athlone Press.
- Trapp, Erich; Beyer, Hans-Veit; Kaplaneres, Sokrates; Leontiadis, Ioannis (1991). Prosopographisches Lexikon der Palaiologenzeit (in German). Vol. 11. Vienna: Verlag der Österreichischen Akademie der Wissenschaften. ISBN 3-7001-3003-1.
