= John Synadenos (megas konostaulos) =

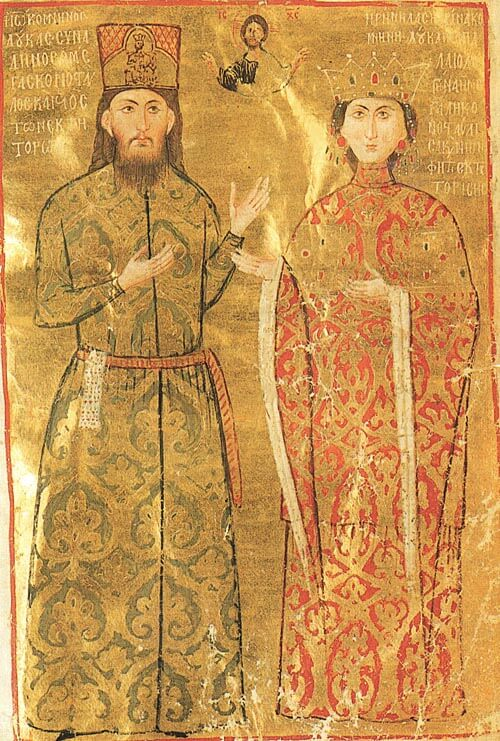
Illuminated donor portrait of the megas konostaulos John Komnenos Doukas Synadenos and his wife Irene Lascarina Comnena Doucaina Palaiologina, from the Typikon of the Monastery of Our Lady of Certain Hope ("Lincoln Typicon").

John Komnenos Doukas Palaiologos Synadenos (Greek: Ἰωάννης Κομνηνός Δούκας Παλαιολόγος Συναδηνός) was a Byzantine noble and military leader in the early 14th century, holding the court title of megas konostaulos.

He was the son (possibly the eldest) of the megas stratopedarches John Synadenos, and brother of the protostrator Theodore Synadenos. He inherited the surname "Palaiologos" from his mother, Theodora Palaiologina Synadene, and was commonly referred to by it. He married a lady named Thomais Komnene Doukaina Laskarina Kantakouzene Palaiologina, descended from the imperial dynasties of Laskaris and Palaiologos, although her exact parentage is unknown. She was his first wife. They seemingly had two daughters, named Anna and Eirene. Anna seems to have married Michael Laskaris Bryennios Philanthropenos. Eirene wed as well, although the identity of her husband seems difficult to establish. He seems to have been named Michael Komnemos Tornikes. John possibly wed a second time, thus outliving the Thomais Lady. Anna herself had a least one daughter, Eudoxia Kantakouzene Philantrophene.

Very little is known about the rest of life, except that he acted as an emissary of Andronikos III Palaiologos to his grandfather Andronikos II during the closing stages of the Byzantine civil war of 1321–1328, along with John Aplesphares.

== Sources ==
- Guilland, Rodolphe (1967). Recherches sur les institutions byzantines [Studies on the Byzantine Institutions]. Berliner byzantinische Arbeiten 35 (in French). Vol. I. Berlin and Amsterdam: Akademie-Verlag & Adolf M. Hakkert. pp. 473, 505. OCLC 878894516.
- Polemis, Demetrios I. (1968). The Doukai: A Contribution to Byzantine Prosopography. London: The Athlone Press. pp. 179–180.
