= Theodora Palaiologina =

Theodora Palaiologina (Greek: Θεοδώρα Παλαιολογίνα) can refer to:

- Theodora Angelina Palaiologina (fl. 1200s), matriarch of the Palaiologi family, mother of Michael VIII Palaiologos
- Theodora Palaiologina (Byzantine empress) (c. 1240–1303), Empress consort of Michael VIII Palaiologos (1259–1282)
- Theodora Palaiologina Synadene, half-niece of Michael VIII
- Theodora Palaiologina, Empress of Bulgaria, Byzantine princess and Empress consort of Theodore Svetoslav (1308–1321) and Michael Shishman (1324–1330)
- Theodora Tocco (died 1429), consort of the Despot of the Morea Constantine (XI) Palaiologos (1428–1429)
