= Stratopedarches =

Greek term used to describe military commanders from the 1st century BC on

Stratopedarchēs (Greek: στρατοπεδάρχης, lit. 'master of the camp'), sometimes Anglicized as Stratopedarch, was a Greek term used with regard to high-ranking military commanders from the 1st century BC on, becoming a proper office in the 10th-century Byzantine Empire. It continued to be employed as a designation, and a proper title, of commanders-in-chief until the 13th century, when the title of megas stratopedarchēs (μέγας στρατοπεδάρχης) or Grand Stratopedarch appeared. This title was awarded to senior commanders and officials, while the ordinary stratopedarchai were henceforth low-ranking military officials.

== History ==
=== Origin and early use ===
The term first appears in the late 1st century BC in the Hellenistic Near East. Its origin is unclear, but it is used as a translation, in some inscriptions, for the contemporary Roman legionary post of praefectus castrorum (lit. 'camp prefect'). Josephus (De Bello Judaico, VI.238) uses the term to refer to the quartermaster-general of all camps, while Dionysius of Halicarnassus (Roman Antiquities, X.36.6) used it to refer to the role of a primus pilus in a legion that had lost its commander. It also occurs in the Bible (Acts 28:16), where it has been interpreted as referring to the praetorian prefect, the commander of the camp and garrison of the Praetorian Guard in Rome, or the subordinate officials praefectus peregrinorum and princeps castrorum.

From the 1st century AD, it was used (albeit infrequently) in a broader sense as a literary term to refer to generals, i.e. as a synonym of the older title stratēgos. Thus in the 4th century, the bishop and historian Eusebius (Church History, IX.5.2) writes of the "stratopedarchēs, whom the Romans call dux". Similarly, in the early 5th century, Ardabur was called "stratopedarchēs of both forces" by Olympiodorus of Thebes, while the acts of the Council of Chalcedon (451) refer to Zeno, "patrikios and stratopedarchēs of both forces of the East". This is an obvious translation of the Latin term magister utriusque militiae, especially as the contemporary historian Eunapius records that the stratopedarchēs was "the greatest of offices". Other Greek-language authors translate Ardabur's title more commonly with stratēlatēs or stratēgos. The Swiss historian Albert Vogt suggested that the stratopedarchai were military intendants, responsible for army supplies and managing the fortified assembly bases, the mitata.

However, as the Byzantinist Rodolphe Guilland commented, references to a stratopedarchēs are rare before the 10th century, and always seem to be a different way of referring—often anachronistically—to a magister militum, or later a thematic stratēgos. Such references exist to emperor Jovian (r. 363–364), who was a general before his rise to the throne, by Theophanes the Confessor; Rusticius, a general of Leo I (r. 457–474), by Zonaras; Busur, an Arab commander in c. 650, by Theophanes; Krateros, a "stratopedarchēs of the East" who was sent to arrest Theodore Stoudites; Eudokimos, stratopedarchēs/stratēgos of Cappadocia and Charsianon under Theophilos (r. 829–842); and a certain Mousilikes, subordinate of the thematic stratēgos of Sicily. A prōtospatharios Constantine, whose seal mentions him as a stratopedarchēs, cannot be further identified.

=== Middle Byzantine period ===
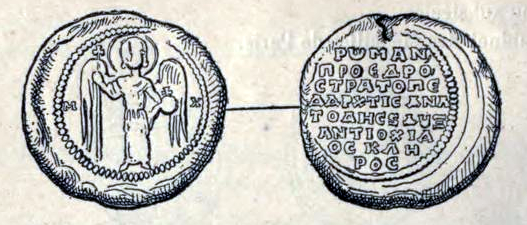
Seal of Romanos Skleros, proedros, stratopedarchēs of the East, and doux of Antioch

In the middle Byzantine period (9th–12th centuries), the term stratopedon came to signify more the army on campaign, rather than the camp itself; hence the term stratopedarchēs was used more in the sense of 'commander-in-chief'. The title is first attested as a technical term in 967, when Emperor Nikephoros II Phokas (r. 963–969) named the eunuch Peter as stratopedarchēs before sending him with an army to Cilicia. The Escorial Taktikon, written a few years later, shows the existence of two stratopedarchai, one of the East (Anatolia) and one of the West (the Balkans). This arrangement parallels that of the two domestikoi tōn scholōn, a fact that led Nicolas Oikonomides to suggest that the post was created as a substitute of the latter office, which was barred to eunuchs until the 11th century.

The actual nature of the office is difficult to reconstruct, as it is rarely found in technical sources like the Byzantine military and court manuals, and its usage in the historical accounts is simply as another word for a high commander, in place of 'stratēgos' or 'domestikos tōn scholōn'. Thus it is unclear what position the stratopedarchēs occupied vis-à-vis the domestikos tōn scholōn, or why some officers received the former rather than the latter title. The precise arrangement suggested by Oikonomides is certainly not in evidence in the 11th and 12th centuries, when the term likely signified a commander-in-chief for a field army composed of professional regiments (tagmata), rather than an institutionalized position.

=== Late Byzantine period ===
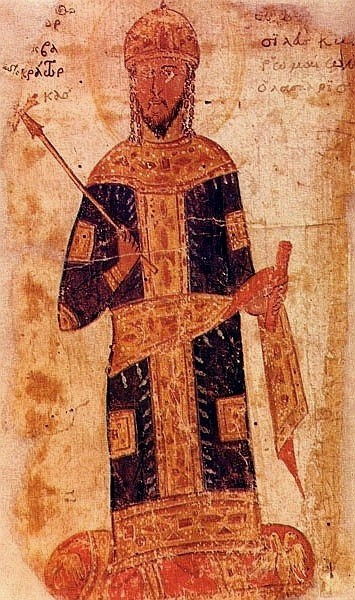
Emperor Theodore II Laskaris (r. 1254–1258), George Mouzalon's friend and patron

The title megas stratopedarchēs ('grand master of the camp') was instituted c. 1255 by the Emperor Theodore II Laskaris (r. 1254–1258) for his chief minister and confidante, George Mouzalon. Theodore II states in a decree that he "established the dignity anew", but no other holder of the office is known before that time. The mid-14th century Book of Offices of pseudo-Kodinos places the megas stratopedarchēs as the ninth-most senior official of the state below the Emperor, ranking between the prōtostratōr and the megas primmikērios. Kodinos reports that he was "supervisor of the provisioning of the army, that is food, drink and all necessities". In reality, however, during the Palaiologan period (1261–1453) the [megas] stratopedarchēs was most likely an honorific court title, and did not necessarily entail an active military command. Like many other titles in the Palaiologan period, the post could be held by two people simultaneously. According to Pseudo-Kodinos, the ceremonial costume of the megas stratopedarchēs was identical to the offices immediately superior to it: a rich silk kabbadion tunic, a golden-red skiadion hat decorated with embroideries in the klapōton style, without veil, or a domedskaranikon hat, again in red and gold and decorated with golden wire, with a portrait of the emperor standing in front, and another of him enthroned in the rear. Only his staff of office (dikanikion) differed, with all the knobs except the topmost in silver, and golden engraved knots.

Pseudo-Kodinos further reports the existence of four subordinate stratopedarchai, occupying the 65th to 68th rank in the imperial hierarchy respectively. These were:

- The stratopedarchēs of the monokaballoi (μονοκάβαλλοι, 'single-horsemen'). Kodinos explains that cavalry used to be raised in the themes according to the wealth of its owners, with the classes being trikaballoi, dikaballoi, and monokaballoi after the number of horses each rider provided; a system similar to that current in Western Europe at the time.
- The stratopedarchēs of the tzangratores (τζαγγράτορες, 'crossbow-men').
- The stratopedarchēs of the mourtatoi (μουρτάτοι). According to Kodinos these were palace guards armed with the bow. Their name is commonly held to derive from the Arabo-Turkish word murted/murtat ('apostate'), implying they were Christianized Turks, but according to Mark Bartusis may refer more generally to the offspring of mixed Greek–Turkish unions.
- The stratopedarchēs of the tzakōnes (τζάκωνες, 'Tsakonians'). The tzakōnes or Lakōnes (Λάκωνες, 'Laconians') had served as marines since Michael VIII Palaiologos. According to Kodinos, some served as palace guards, equipped with maces (apelatikia) and wearing with a distinctive blue cuirass that bore two white lions facing each other on the chest, but the stratopedarchēs supervised those tzakōnes who were employed as garrison troops in various fortresses.

The dress of these junior members of the court was the same: a white skiadion with embroideries, a long kabbadion of "commonly used silk", and a skaranikon covered in red velvet and topped by a small red tassel. Their dikanikia were of smooth, unadorned wood.

The semi-autonomous Despotate of the Morea appears to have had a megas stratopedarchēs and subordinate stratopedarchai of its own.

== List of known stratopedarchai ==
Name	Tenure	Appointed by	Notes	Refs
Peter	967–977	Nikephoros II Phokas; John I Tzimiskes	Eunuch servant of Nikephoros II, he was raised to stratopedarchēs of the eastern armies and played a major role in the campaigns of the next decade. In 969 he led the capture of Antioch and forced the Hamdanid Emirate of Aleppo to become an imperial vassal, participated in the Siege of Dorostolon, and was killed in 977 fighting against the rebel general Bardas Skleros.	
Nikephoros	1048–1050	Constantine IX Monomachos	A eunuch and former cleric, he was ignorant of military affairs but a trusted friend of Constantine IX. Named rhaiktōr and stratopedarchēs, he succeeded in subduing the Shaddadid emir of Dvin, Abu'l-Aswar Shavur ibn Fadl. In the next year he was again commander-in-chief against the Pechenegs in the Balkans, but was defeated.	
Isaac Komnenos	c. 1042–1054	Constantine IX Monomachos	A seal mentioning his titles as magistros, vestarchēs and stratopedarchēs of the East survives, and he was "relieved of the stratopedarchia of the East" by Empress Theodora after her accession. He may however have been in reality a domestikos tōn scholōn.	
Romanos Skleros	c. 1055/57	Constantine IX Monomachos; Theodora	Great-grandson of the general and rebel Bardas Skleros, he rose to prominence due to his sister, who was the mistress of Constantine IX, and was raised successively to higher commands and titles. He ended his career with the titles of proedros, stratopedarchēs of the East and doux of Antioch. He may however have been in reality a domestikos tōn scholōn.	
Alexios Komnenos	c. 1074	Michael VII Doukas	The future emperor is mentioned as stratopedarchēs of the East in 1074, by his son-in-law and historian Nikephoros Bryennios the Younger.	
Eumathios Philokales	1092/3–1111/2	Alexios I Komnenos	One of the most distinguished commanders of Alexios I Komnenos, he was named stratopedarchēs and governor of Cyprus in 1092/3, a post he held at least until 1111/12. By 1118, he had risen further to become megas doux.	
Aspietes	c. 1105	Alexios I Komnenos	Of noble Armenian descent, he served as stratopedarchēs of the East and governor of Cilicia in c. 1105, but due to his negligence was defeated by Tancred of Antioch.	
Isaac Komnenos	unknown	John II Komnenos (?)	A basileopatōr, sebastokratōr, and stratopedarchēs John Komnenos Doukas is attested in a seal of office. The first title is more suitable for Isaac, the older brother of Alexios I who stepped aside for Alexios to accede to the throne, but the surname 'Doukas' points to Alexios I's son Isaac. Apart from the title of sebastokratōr, the other two titles are otherwise unattested for him.	
Manuel Lykaïtes	12th century	unknown	Known only from a single seal, he was stratopedarchēs and doux of the great imperial camp and horse farms at Malagina.	
Andronikos Komnenos	12th century	unknown	Mentioned by Eustathius of Thessalonica, otherwise unidentified.	
Michael Phokas	c. 1235–1253	John III Vatatzes	A relative by marriage of the Nicaean emperor John Vatatzes, he is attested as "stratopedarchēs of the Thracesian Theme and of Philadelphia", in effect combining the role of a provincial governor (doux) with the new role of the stratopedarchēs as a fiscal intendant over a fixed circumscription.	
Theophanes	mid-13th century	unknown	Mentioned, as "stratopedarchēs and paradotēs" (a fiscal official), in an act concerning possessions of the Monastery of Saint John the Theologian.	
George Sophianos	c. 1280	John V Palaiologos	Stratopedarchēs and governor of Karyopolis in the Morea.	
Siouros	c. 1303	Andronikos II Palaiologos	Stratopedarchēs of the tzangratores, sent to command troops against the Ottoman Turks, he was defeated near the fortress of Katoikia, losing the army's pay chest.	
Petzikopoulos	before 1325	Andronikos II Palaiologos	Known through his wife Melane, daughter Eulogia, and sons Demetrios Doukas Petzikopoulos and John Senachereim, all active in Thessalonica in 1325–1327.	
John Choumnos	c. 1344	John V Palaiologos	Pansebastos sebastos and stratopedarchēs of the monokaballoi, mentioned in a chrysobull gifting him with lands at Zichnai. He was the son of either the parakoimomenos John Choumnos, or the megas stratopedarchēs George Choumnos.	
Demetrios	c. 1348	John VI Kantakouzenos	Mentioned as recently deceased in a synodal act of November 1348 along with his brother, the orphanotrophos Alexios. Their mother was a lady of the Xanthopoulos family.	
Akrokondylos	c. 1375	unknown	Mentioned among the donors of lands to the Brontochion Monastery at Mystras.	
Kantakouzenos	before 1453	unknown	Unnamed son of the prōtostratōr Manuel Kantakouzenos.	

== List of known megaloi stratopedarchai ==
=== Byzantine Empire ===
Name	Tenure	Appointed by	Notes	Refs
George Mouzalon	c. 1255	Theodore II Laskaris	A childhood friend and the closest confidante of Theodore II, he was raised to the high ranks of prōtosebastos, megas stratopedarchēs, and later megas domestikos and prōtovestiarios. He was assassinated by the nobles under Michael VIII Palaiologos soon after Theodore II's death.	
Balaneidiotes	c. 1259 – before 1266	Michael VIII Palaiologos	A page of Theodore II but of humble origin, he was betrothed on the emperor's wish to Theodora, daughter of Martha Palaiologina (sister of the future emperor Michael VIII) and the megas domestikos Nikephoros Tarchaneiotes. The betrothal was abruptly terminated by the emperor, who forced Theodora to marry the elderly Basil Kaballarios. Theodora and her mother opposed the marriage, and it remained unconsummated. After Michael VIII became emperor, he allowed his niece to marry Balanidiotes, and named him megas stratopedarchēs. He died before 1266.	
John Komnenos Doukas Angelos Synadenos	c. 1276/77 – before 1266	Michael VIII Palaiologos; Andronikos II Palaiologos	He was named megas stratopedarchēs in c. 1276/77, when he led an army against John I Doukas of Thessaly. He was defeated and captured at the Battle of Pharsalus, but evidently released soon after. In c. 1280 he married Theodora, daughter of Constantine Palaiologos and niece of Emperor Michael VIII. In 1281 he was one of the imperial commanders that raised the Siege of Berat and in 1283/4, he was sent, along with the megas domestikos Alexios Raoul, at the head of a fleet to Demetrias. He died as a monk, leaving behind two sons, Theodore and John Synadenos, and a daughter, Euphrosyne.	
Libadarios	c. 1296	Andronikos II Palaiologos	Prōtovestiaritēs and governor of Neokastra, he suppressed the usurpation attempt by Alexios Philanthropenos in late 1295, and was promoted to megas stratopedarchēs as a reward. Possibly identical with Constantine Doukas Limpidares, a general fighting against the Turks who defected to the Angevins in 1307.	
Alexios	late 13th/early 14th century	Andronikos II Palaiologos (?)	Known solely through the works of the court poet Manuel Philes.	
Raoul	early 14th century	Andronikos II Palaiologos (?)	Known solely through the works of Manuel Philes. Was married and had children, who died early. Possibly the son of the megas domestikos Alexios Raoul.	
Manuel Palaiologos	14th century	unknown	Otherwise unknown, but perhaps the same as Manuel Tagaris, who married into the Palaiologos family.	
Angelos Senachereim	c. 1310/11–1311 or 1315	unknown	Son of the megas domestikos John Angelos Senachereim, he was an experienced soldier, having fought against the Turks, the Albanians, and the Catalan Company in the 1300s. In 1310/11 he was charged with escorting 2100 Turks under Halil, who had separated from the Catalans, through Macedonia to the Hellespont. Instead of ferrying them over, as promised, the co-emperor Michael IX Palaiologos attacked them, but was defeated. His wife and children all died before him.	
Manuel Tagaris	c. 1321–1329	Andronikos II Palaiologos	A brave and capable soldier of humble birth, his successful defence of Philadelphia against the Ottoman Turks had merited him the hand of Andronikos II's niece, Theodora Asanina. In 1321, the emperor charged him to hunt and capture his grandson, Andronikos III Palaiologos, who had fled the capital, but Tagaris persuaded the emperor that this was unfeasible. He was the father of George Tagaris, also a megas stratopedarchēs.	
Andronikos Palaiologos	c. 1321–1324	Andronikos III Palaiologos; Andronikos II Palaiologos	Appointed megas stratopedarchēs by Andronikos III during the early phase of his conflict with his grandfather, Andronikos II. Named governor of Stenimachos and Tzepaina in the Rhodope region, he defected to Andronikos II. In c. 1324 he was sent as envoy to Michael Shishman of Bulgaria.	
Sphrantzes Palaiologos	1334–1339	Andronikos III Palaiologos	A minor nobleman, he was named megas stratopedarchēs as a reward for assassinating the renegade general Syrgiannes Palaiologos. He died of typhus in 1339 while campaigning in Acarnania.	
Andronikos Palaiologos	1341–1342	John V Palaiologos	Appointed megas stratopedarchēs after the coronation of John V on 19 November 1341, he was soon promoted to prōtostratōr and fought against John VI Kantakouzenos during the Byzantine civil war of 1341–1347.	
George Choumnos	1341–1342	John V Palaiologos	Long-serving official and governor in Thessalonica in 1328 and Constantinople in 1339, as well as epi tēs trapezēs. He was appointed megas stratopedarchēs after the coronation of John V on 19 November 1341, but fell into disfavour and was placed under house arrest in late 1342 for advocating a compromise peace with John VI Kantakouzenos during the civil war of 1341–1347.	
John Vatatzes	1343–1345	John VI Kantakouzenos	Prōtokynēgos and megas chartoularios. Originally a partisan of the anti-Kantakouzenos regency in the civil war, in 1341–1342 and again in 1343 he defected to John VI Kantakouzenos, who named him megas stratopedarchēs. He was killed by Turkish mercenaries at Garella in 1345. His son was married to the daughter of Patriarch John XIV Kalekas, and his two daughters were married to the son of the megas doux Alexios Apokaukos, and to the emir of the Karasids, Suleyman.	
Demetrios Tzamplakon	1345–1366/7	John VI Kantakouzenos	Son of Alexios Tzamplakon, landowner in Macedonia, and supporter of Kantakouzenos. He unsuccessfully opposed the surrender of Serres to the Serbian ruler Stephen Dushan in 1345, and retired to Christopolis after that.	
George Tagaris	1346–1355	John V Palaiologos; John VI Kantakouzenos	Son of the megas stratopedarchēs Manuel Tagaris. Sent by Empress-dowager Anna of Savoy to the Saruhanids for aid in 1346, attested in 1355 as a supporter of the Union of the Churches.	
Peter Koutzalas	c. 1348	unknown	Landowner near Trikala, attested in an act of donation to the Lykousada Monastery at Fanari.	
Michael Philanthropenos	c. 1350 or earlier	John V Palaiologos (?)	Attested as landowner in Chalcidice, and as a "cousin" of John V Palaiologos.	
George Synadenos Astras	c. 1354 – before 1366	John VI Kantakouzenos; John V Palaiologos	In 1354 he was entrusted with the renovation of the Hagia Sophia. Later governor of Ainos, Lemnos, and Thessalonica, where he died in 1365/66 of the plague.	
Demetrios Angelos Metochites	c. 1355	John VI Kantakouzenos	Son of Theodore Metochites, governor of Strumitza in 1326 and of Serres in 1328/29. Addressed by Pope Innocent VI in 1355 as a supporter of the Union of the Churches.	
Alexios	1358 – before 1373	John V Palaiologos	Son of the megas domestikos Demetrios Palaiologos, ruler, along with his brother, the megas primmikērios John, of the coastal region around the Strymon River and the island of Thasos from c. 1357 until his death sometime between 1368 and 1373. In 1362/3 he founded the Pantokratoros Monastery on Mount Athos along with his brother.	
Markos Palaiologos Iagaris	1430 – unknown	John VIII Palaiologos	Frequently employed as a diplomatic envoy to Western powers and the Ottomans between 1417 and 1438, he was promoted to megas stratopedarchēs from prōtostratōr in 1429/30.	
Phrangopoulos	by 1437	unknown	Attested only as emissary between John Eugenikos and Bessarion.	
Demetrios Palaiologos Metochites	1444–1453	John VIII Palaiologos; Constantine XI Palaiologos	Governor of Lemnos, he was named megas stratopedarchēs in 1444. He was the last governor of Constantinople, serving from 1449. He was killed along with his sons during the Fall of Constantinople in 1453.	

=== Empire of Trebizond ===
Name	Tenure	Appointed by	Notes	Refs
Sebastos	c. 1340	Basil Megas Komnenos	Among the leaders of the opposition to Empress Irene Palaiologina at the beginning of the Trapezuntine Civil Wars. Defeated and exiled to Limnia, where he was executed in June 1341.	
Theodore Pileles Doranites	c. 1349/50	Alexios III Megas Komnenos (?)	One of the leading figures in the Trapezuntine Civil Wars, imprisoned in 1349/50, released and promoted to prōtovestiarios, imprisoned again and executed in July 1352.	
Sampson	c. 1355	Alexios III Megas Komnenos	Attested only as escorting the rebel leader Niketas Scholares to Trebizond in October 1355.	

== Sources ==
- Applebaum, Shimon (1989). Judaea in Hellenistic and Roman Times: Historical and Archeological Essays. Leiden: Brill. ISBN 978-90-04-08821-4.
- Bartusis, Mark C. (1997). The Late Byzantine Army: Arms and Society 1204–1453. Philadelphia, Pennsylvania: University of Pennsylvania Press. ISBN 0-8122-1620-2.
- Guilland, Rodolphe (1967). "Le Stratopédarque et le Grand statopédarque". Recherches sur les institutions byzantines [Studies on the Byzantine Institutions]. Berliner byzantinische Arbeiten 35 (in French). Vol. I. Berlin and Amsterdam: Akademie-Verlag & Adolf M. Hakkert. pp. 498–521. OCLC 878894516.
- Kazhdan, Alexander, ed. (1991). The Oxford Dictionary of Byzantium. Oxford and New York: Oxford University Press. ISBN 0-19-504652-8.
- Kühn, Hans-Joachim (1991). Die byzantinische Armee im 10. und 11. Jahrhundert: Studien zur Organisation der Tagmata (in German). Vienna: Fassbaender Verlag. ISBN 3-9005-38-23-9.
- Lilie, Ralph-Johannes; Ludwig, Claudia; Pratsch, Thomas; Zielke, Beate (2013). Prosopographie der mittelbyzantinischen Zeit Online. Berlin-Brandenburgische Akademie der Wissenschaften. Nach Vorarbeiten F. Winkelmanns erstellt (in German). Berlin and Boston: De Gruyter.
- Macrides, Ruth (2007). George Akropolites: The History. Oxford: Oxford University Press. ISBN 978-0-19-921067-1.
- Oikonomides, Nicolas (1972). Les listes de préséance byzantines des IXe et Xe siècles (in French). Paris: Editions du Centre National de la Recherche Scientifique.
- Skoulatos, Basile (1980). Les personnages byzantins de l'Alexiade: Analyse prosopographique et synthèse [The Byzantine Personalities of the Alexiad: Prosopographical Analysis and Synthesis] (in French). Louvain-la-Neuve and Louvain: Bureau du Recueil Collège Érasme and Éditions Nauwelaerts. OCLC 8468871.
- Tajra, Harry W. (2010). The Martyrdom of St. Paul: Historical and Judicial Context, Traditions, and Legends. Wipf and Stock Publishers. ISBN 978-1-61097-006-8.
- Trapp, Erich; Beyer, Hans-Veit; Walther, Rainer; Sturm-Schnabl, Katja; Kislinger, Ewald; Leontiadis, Ioannis; Kaplaneres, Sokrates (1976–1996). Prosopographisches Lexikon der Palaiologenzeit (in German). Vienna: Verlag der Österreichischen Akademie der Wissenschaften. ISBN 3-7001-3003-1.
- Verpeaux, Jean, ed. (1966). Pseudo-Kodinos, Traité des Offices (in French). Centre National de la Recherche Scientifique. ISBN 978-2-222-00901-6.
