= Michael Kaballarios =

Michael Kaballarios (Greek: Μιχαήλ Καβαλλάριος) was a Byzantine aristocrat and military leader. In ca. 1277 he was megas konostaulos (commander of the Latin mercenaries). Along with the megas stratopedarches John Synadenos, he led a Byzantine army against John I Doukas of Thessaly, but was defeated in the Battle of Pharsalus and died shortly afterwards of his wounds.

== Sources ==
- Geanakoplos, Deno John (1959). Emperor Michael Palaeologus and the West, 1258–1282: A Study in Byzantine-Latin Relations. Cambridge, Massachusetts: Harvard University Press. OCLC 1011763434.
- Kazhdan, Alexander, ed. (1991). The Oxford Dictionary of Byzantium. Oxford and New York: Oxford University Press. p. 1087. ISBN 0-19-504652-8.
