= Irene Komnene Laskarina Branaina =

Byzantine noblewoman

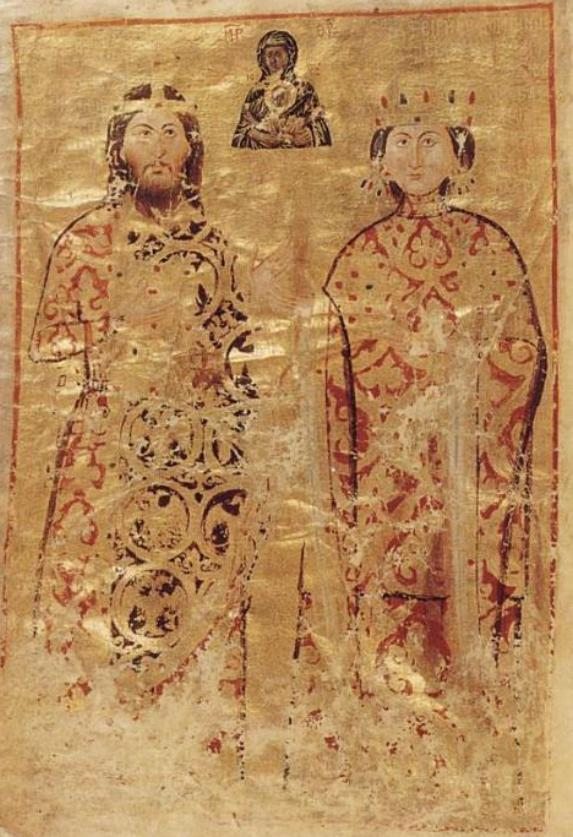
Miniature of the sebastokrator Constantine Palaiologos and his wife Irene, from the so-called Lincoln Typicon, ca. 1350

Irene Komnene Laskarina Branaina (Greek: Ειρήνη Κομνηνή Λασκαρίνα Βρανᾶίνα; died around 1271) was a Byzantine noblewoman and wife of sebastokrator Constantine Palaiologos, half-brother of Byzantine Emperor Michael VIII Palaiologos. She seems to have followed suit after her husband's retirement to a convent, and taken the monastic name of Maria. She probably died as a nun.

== Marriage and family ==
Irene was the granddaughter of Byzantine General Theodore Branas and Agnes of France, though the Branas genealogy is poorly recorded. She possibly was a grandchild through an unregistered son of Theodore and Anna. For D. M. Nicol, in his book, the Byzantine Family of Kantakouzenos (Cantacuzenus) ca. 1100–1460, 1968, her father is simply named strategos Branas. He was alive in 1259, while her mother was possibly the daughter of Michael Laskaris. Through Theodore, she was also related to the Vatatzes.

Irene was married c. 1259 to Constantine Palaiologos, by whom he seems to have had five children".

- Michael Komnenos Branas Palaiologos
- Andronikos Branas Doukas Angelos Palaiologos.
- Maria Komnene Branaina Laskarina Doukaina Tornikina Palaiologina. Married Isaac Komnenos Doukas Tornikios.. Mother of Tornikes, Andronikos Komnenos Doukas Palaiologos.
- Theodora. Married John Komnenos Doukas Angelos Synadenos and had three children. Later became a nun under the name Theodoule.
- Daughter (name unknown). Married Smilets of Bulgaria.

Her wedding date correspond to the year where her first cousin, Anselin (or Anseau as he's sometimes called) of Toucy, was captured by Michael VIII, and with whom he allied himself to retake Constantinople, though Anselin tricked him and run away.. Michael had probably hoped to integrate the Principalty of Archea into the empire once more, as he arranged Constantine and Irene wedding but also the marriage between Theodora, daughter of Theodore II Laskaris, and Matthew de Walincourt, a Frankish noble from the Peloponnese, who was living at the court.
