= Battle of Pharsalus (1277) =

1277 battle in Greece

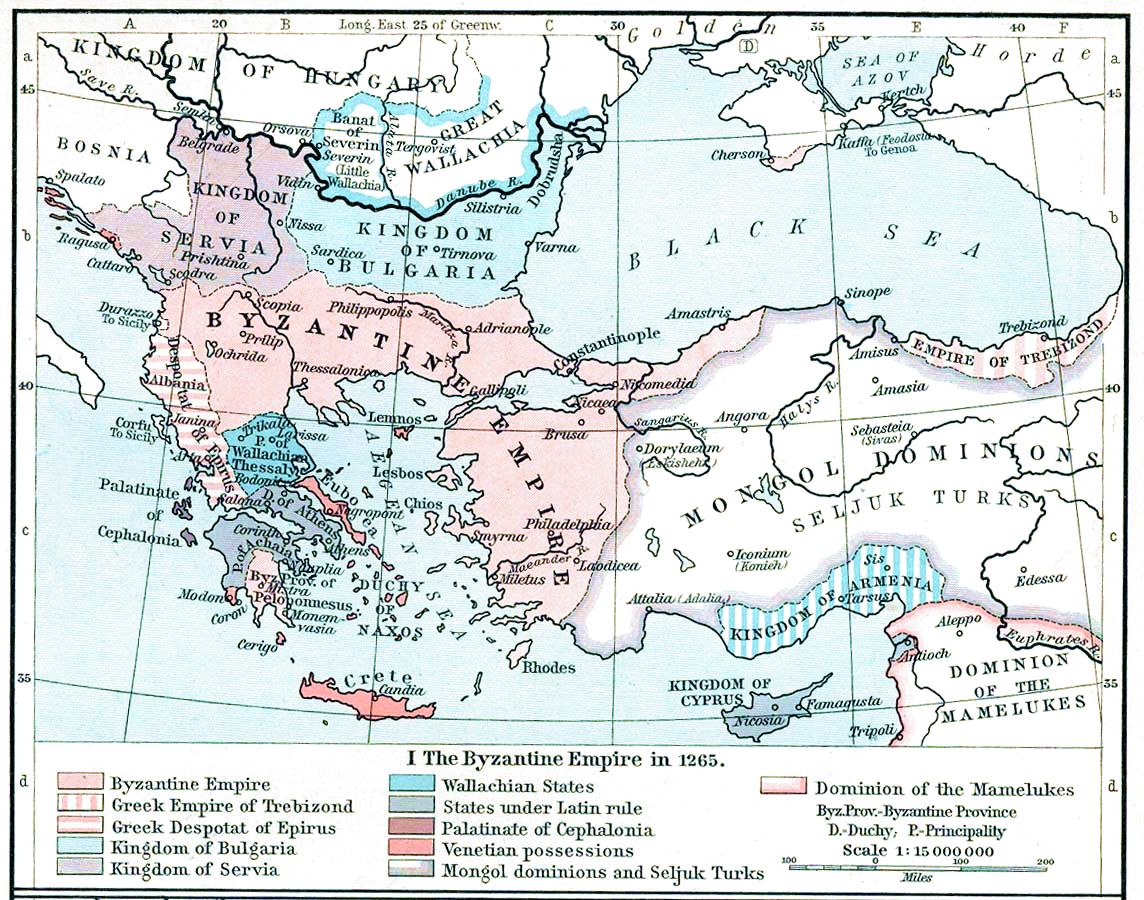
- Map of the Byzantine Empire and the surrounding states in 1265
| Date | 1277 |
| Location | Pharsalus, Greece |
| Result | Thessalian victory |

Belligerents
| Byzantine Empire | Thessaly |

Commanders and leaders
| John Synadenos (POW); Michael Kaballarios (DOW) | John I Doukas |

The Battle of Pharsalus was fought in late 1277 at the plain of Pharsalus in Thessaly between an invading Byzantine army led by the megas stratopedarches John Synadenos and megas konostaulos Michael Kaballarios, and the forces of John I Doukas, ruler of Thessaly. This was the first major Byzantine campaign against Thessaly after the failure of the previous expedition at the Battle of Neopatras (dated variously to 1273–1275). The battle resulted in a crushing victory for John Doukas: Synadenos was captured, while Kaballarios died shortly afterwards of his wounds.

== Sources ==
- Geanakoplos, Deno John (1959). Emperor Michael Palaeologus and the West, 1258–1282: A Study in Byzantine-Latin Relations. Cambridge, Massachusetts: Harvard University Press. p. 297.
