= Leo Sarakenopoulos =

Leo Sarakenopoulos (Greek: Λέων Σαρακηνόπουλος, fl. 970s) was a 10th-century Byzantine military commander who was active in the northeastern Balkans.

== Biography ==
Leo Sarakenopoulos first appears in 971, at the end of the Rus'–Byzantine War of 970–971, when he was appointed by Emperor John I Tzimiskes (r. 969–976) as military governor (strategos) of Dristra/Dorostolon (modern Silistra) on the Danube. Prior to that, Sarakenopoulos had been commander (domestikos) of the elite regiment (tagma) of the Hikanatoi. Sometime before 975, his province was extended and he was also given control over the old Bulgarian capital, Preslav (renamed Ioannopolis by Emperor Tzimiskes). Leo moved his headquarters to Preslav, where a large number of his seals, bearing his full title of "protospatharios and strategos of Ioannopolis and Dristra" have been discovered. From this position, Sarakenopoulos oversaw a major programme of fortifications in the Dobruja, to safeguard against another Rus' attack. The long-abandoned Roman forts of the old limes were re-occupied and restored, and new facilities created.

Shortly after 976, when the revolt of the Cometopuli brothers broke out, Sarakenopoulos was given joint command of Ioannopolis with the old theme of Thrace, probably in order to counter the rebellion. In this he failed, and was recalled to Constantinople in circa 979. There, he was raised to the rank of patrikios as a consolation and given the position of Count of the Stable, while at a later date, according to his seals, he also received the post of protostrator.

== Sources ==
- Lilie, Ralph-Johannes; Ludwig, Claudia; Pratsch, Thomas; Zielke, Beate (2013). Prosopographie der mittelbyzantinischen Zeit Online. Berlin-Brandenburgische Akademie der Wissenschaften. Nach Vorarbeiten F. Winkelmanns erstellt (in German). Berlin and Boston: De Gruyter.
- Stephenson, Paul (2000). Byzantium's Balkan Frontier: A Political Study of the Northern Balkans, 900–1204. Cambridge, United Kingdom: Cambridge University Press. ISBN 0-521-77017-3.
