= Synadene =

Queen consort of Hungary from 1074 to 1077

Queen consort of Hungary
- Tenure: 1074–1077
- Spouse: Géza I of Hungary
- House: Synadenos
- Father: Theodoulos Synadenos

Synadene (Greek: Συναδηνή, Hungarian: Szünadéné) (also called The Synadene) was a Byzantine Greek woman who briefly acted as queen consort of Hungary, probably in the 1070s. She was most likely married to King Géza I.

== Husband's identity ==
Synadene's first name is unknown. Her father was the Byzantine commander Theodoulos Synadenos, while her mother was a sister of Nikephoros III Botaneiates, who ruled as Byzantine emperor in 1078–1081. The Byzantine chronicle of Scylitzes Continuatus states that "the emperor had given his niece the Synadene, daughter of Theodoulos Synadenos, to the krales of Hungary for a wife; upon his death she returned to Byzantium." The king's name, much like her own, is not mentioned.

An important clue to the identity of Synadene's husband lies in one of the enamel plaques contained in the Holy Crown of Hungary, which depicts a man identified as "Géza, faithful king of the Hungarians". Géza I's death on 25 April 1077 corresponds to Scylitzes Continuatus's narration, with the queen dowager returning to the Byzantine Empire by late 1079. The only possible alternative is Géza's brother and successor, Ladislaus I, in which case the marriage would have taken place in c. 1079 and her return to Hungary as a widow in 1095. However, Scylitzes Continuatus mentions no other events from the mid-1090s, which makes it likely that Géza I was the king whom Synadene married.

== Marriage date ==
The date of Synadene's marriage is even less certain than the identity of her husband. R. Kerbl suggested the period between 1064 and 1067. He referred to the union as a "private arrangement" between Duke Géza and those Byzantine commanders (including Synadene's uncle, who had not yet become emperor) who were in charge of Balkan and Danubian territories. Géza then possibly ruled south-eastern part of Hungary, on the border of the Byzantine Empire, and had a poor relationship with his cousin, King Solomon, making the marriage with Synadene politically advantageous. However, given that Synadene returned to Byzantium upon Géza's death, it is likely that the marriage produced no issue, and that the mother of his children, born in the 1060s, was his first wife, Sophia. It is thus safe to assume that the marriage took place in the mid-1070s.

== Sources ==
- McGeer, E.; Nesbitt, J. (2020). Byzantium in the Time of Troubles: The Continuation of the Chronicle of John Skylitzes (1057-1079). The Medieval Mediterranean, Vol. 120. Leiden, The Netherlands: Brill (published December 30, 2019). p. 189. doi:10.1163/9789004419407. ISBN 978-90-04-41940-7.
- Shepard, Jonnathan (1999). "Byzantium and the Steppe-Nomads: the Hungarian Dimension". In Prinzing, Günter; Salamon, Maciej (eds.). Byzanz und Ostmitteleuropa 950–1453: Beiträge einer table-ronde während des XIX. International Congress of Byzantine Studies, Copenhagen 1996. Harrassowitz Verlag. pp. 55–83. ISBN 3447041463 – via www.academia.edu.

Royal titles
| Preceded by Judith of Swabia | Queen consort of Hungary; 1074–1077 | Succeeded by Adelaide of Rheinfelden |
