= Theodora Palaiologina Synadene =

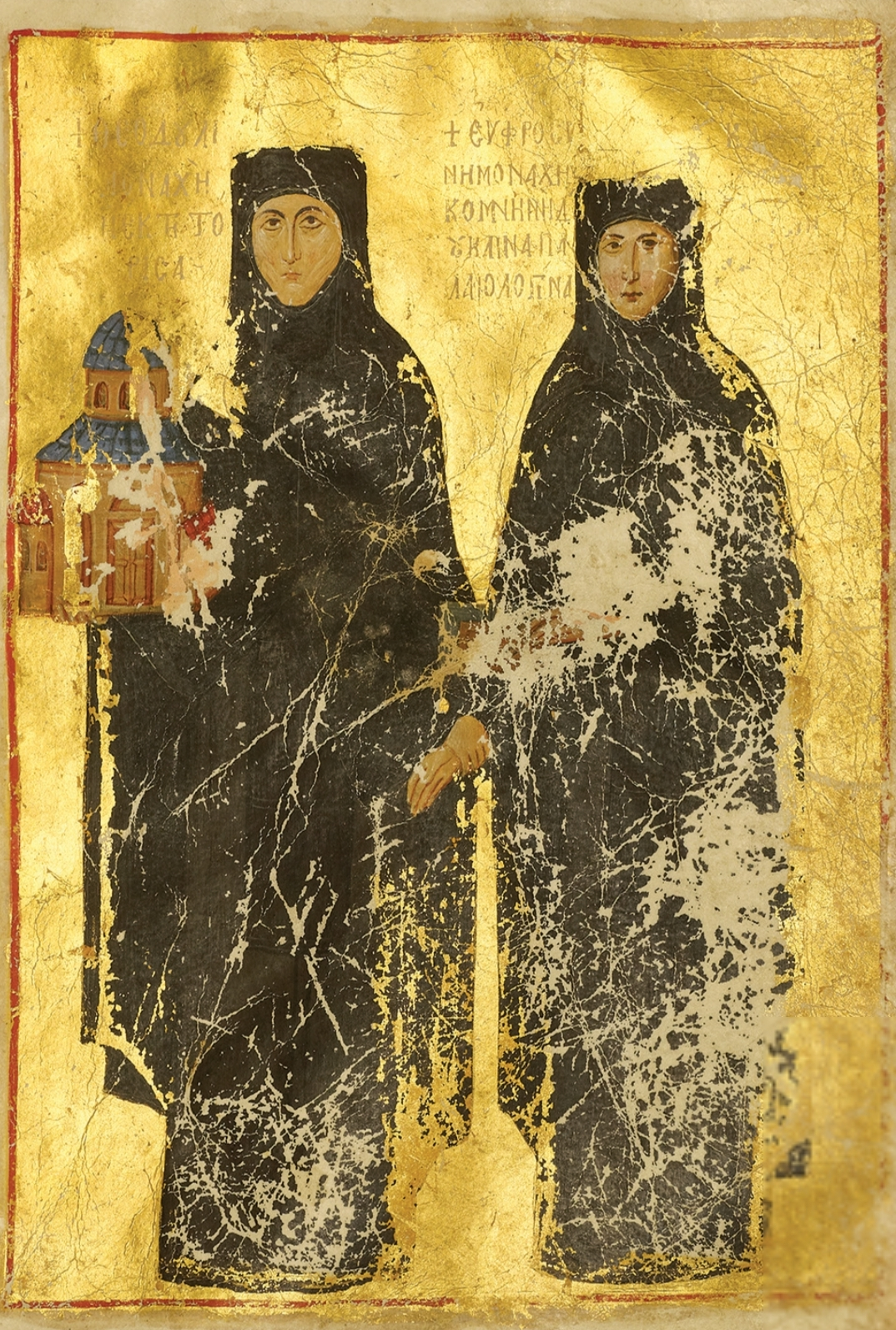
Illuminated donor portrait of Theodora Palaeologina Synadene as nun Theodule and her daughter Euphrosyne Palaelogina Synadene, from the Typikon of the Monastery of Our Lady of Certain Hope ("Lincoln Typicon").

Theodora Palaiologina Synadene (Greek: Θεοδώρα Παλαιολογίνα Συναδηνή) was the daughter of Constantine Palaiologos and Irene Komnene Laskarina Branaina. Through her father, she was a half-niece of the Byzantine Emperor Michael VIII Palaiologos.

== Early life ==
Both of Theodora's parents died when she was young and unmarried, after which time she was brought up under the guardianship of her paternal half-uncle, the emperor Michael VIII.

== Marriage and children ==
Sometime after being taken in by her half-uncle, Theodora was married to a Byzantine noble named John Angelos Doukas Synadenos, by whom she had three children:

- Euphrosyne Synadene. A nun.
- Theodore Synadenos. Protostrator. Married Eudokia Muzakiaina
- John Synadenos. Megas Konostaulos. Married Thomais Komnene Doukaina Laskarina Kantakouzene Palaiologina.. He possibly outlived his wife and wed a second time. From the Kantakouzene, they have had two daughters: Anna and Eirene. Anna seems to have married Michael Laskaris Bryennios Philanthropenos, who died in 1332. Eirene married but the identity of her husband is confusing. He seems to have been named Michael Komnemos Tornikes.
- An unnamed daughter, once reportedly considered as a possible bride for the Bulgarian tsar Theodore Svetoslav.

== Later life ==
It was not long after the death of her husband that Theodora decided to create the convent of Bebaia Elpis ("Sure Hope") in Constantinople, bringing her daughter, Euphrosyne, along with her. Sometime in the 14th century, she wrote the Typicon of Bebaia Elpis. Several members of her family made donations to the convent, including Theodora's sister, Smiltsena.

The exact year of Theodora's death is unknown, though it was certainly in the 14th century. After her death, either her daughter-in-law or her granddaughter Xene Philantropene (most probably the monastic name of Anna Kantakouzene Philanthropene) and her own daughter, Eudokia (monastic name, Eugenia) Kantakouzene Philantrophene made donations to the convent.
