= Demetrios Palaiologos Metochites =

Byzantine nobleman, governor and official

Demetrios Palaiologos Metochites (Greek: Δημήτριος Παλαιολόγος Μετοχίτης; died 29 May 1453) was a Byzantine nobleman and high-ranking governor and official, who served as the last Byzantine governor of Constantinople.

== Biography ==
Demetrios Palaiologos Metochites was descended from the imperial dynasty of the Palaiologoi through his mother, while his father was a Metochites, another family of the high aristocracy. He is first mentioned in 1433. At the time he held the rank of protovestiarites and participated in the Byzantine embassy to the Council of Basel which resulted in the Union of the Byzantine Church with the Catholic Church. The vehement reactions of the largely anti-Unionist Byzantine clergy and populace put an end to his diplomatic career, but on his return he was raised to the court rank of megas primmikerios and appointed as governor of the Aegean island of Lemnos, one of the largest territories still in Byzantine hands (ca. 1435/1437). He successfully defended Lemnos against Turkish attacks, and was promoted to the rank of megas stratopedarches sometime between 1437 and 1444. About 1449 Demetrios was appointed as governor of the imperial capital, Constantinople, a post which he held until the city's fall to the Ottoman Empire in 1453, during which he died along with his sons, during the final Turkish assault on 29 May.

== Sources ==
- Laurent, V. (1957). "Le dernier gouverneur byzantin de Constantinople: Démétrius Paléologue, Grand Stratopédarque († 1453)". Revue des études byzantines (in French). 15: 196–206. doi:10.3406/rebyz.1957.1156.
- Trapp, Erich; Beyer, Hans-Veit; Kislinger, Ewald; Leontiadis, Ioannis (1985). "17981. Μετοχίτης, ∆ημήτριος Παλαιολόγος". Prosopographisches Lexikon der Palaiologenzeit (in German). Vol. 7. Vienna: Verlag der Österreichischen Akademie der Wissenschaften. ISBN 3-7001-3003-1.
