= Strator =

Position in the Roman and Byzantine militaries

Α strator (Greek: στράτωρ) was a position in the Roman and Byzantine militaries roughly equivalent to a groom. The word is derived from Latin sternere ("to strew", i.e. hay, straw).

The strator (in Greek narrative sources often replaced with the Greek equivalent of hippokomos) was typically a soldier, sometimes even a centurion, who was chosen from the ranks to act as a groom for a senior officer or civil official. His tasks included attending to and even procuring horses, and the supervision of the stable. In the Roman Empire, the stratores of the imperial court formed a distinct corps, the schola stratorum, headed by the Count of the Stable (comes stabuli), and later, in the middle Byzantine period, the protostrator (πρωτοστράτωρ, "first strator"). In the provincial administration, senior stratores chosen among centurions etc. were typically members of the staff of Roman governors and in turn headed other, more junior stratores.

In the Byzantine Empire, the title was more generally used as an honorific dignity for mid-level civil and military officials from the 8th century on, which led to the actual grooms of the imperial court being distinguished as "stratores of the imperial stratorikion". The dignity of the strator belonged to those intended for "bearded men" (i.e. non-eunuchs), and was conferred by the award of an insigne (dia brabeiou axia), in this case a jewelled gold whip. It ranked relatively low in the imperial hierarchy: in the Kletorologion of 899, it ranks sixth from the bottom, above the kandidatos and below the hypatos.

The title appears in Western Europe from the mid-8th century onwards, possibly under Byzantine influence. The variant form starator is attested in the Kingdom of Cyprus in 1402.
