= Syrgiannes Palaiologos =

Byzantine general and governor

Syrgiannes Palaiologos Philanthropenos
- Born: c. 1290
- Died: 1334
- Allegiance: Byzantine Empire (until 1333); Serbian Kingdom (1333–1334)
- Rank: megas doux
- Conflicts: Byzantine civil war of 1321–1328

Syrgiannes Palaiologos Philanthropenos (Greek: Συργιάννης Παλαιολόγος Φιλανθρωπηνός; c. 1290 – 1334) was a Byzantine aristocrat and general of mixed Cuman and Greek descent, who was involved in the civil war between Emperor Andronikos II Palaiologos (r. 1282–1328) and his grandson Andronikos III (r. 1328–1341). Loyal only to himself and his own ambitions, he switched sides several times, and ended up conquering much of Macedonia for the Serbian ruler Stefan Dušan (r. 1331–1346) before being assassinated by the Byzantines.

== Biography ==
=== Family origins and early career ===
Syrgiannes was born about 1290. He was named after his father or possibly grandfather, a Cuman leader who became megas domestikos (commander-in-chief of the Byzantine army) under Emperor Andronikos II. At the time there were many Cumans in the Empire, who settled during the reign of John III Doukas Vatatzes (r. 1221–1254). The elder Syrgiannes's original name was Sytzigan (from Cuman-Turkic Sïčğan, "mouse"); it was Hellenized to Syrgiannes ("master John") when he was baptized. The younger Syrgiannes's mother was Eugenia Palaiologina, a member of the ruling Palaiologos family and niece of Emperor Michael VIII (r. 1259–1282). Conscious of the prestige of his mother's family name, young Syrgiannes chose to use that in order to advance himself in the imperial hierarchy. Syrgiannes also had a sister, Theodora, who married Guy de Lusignan, later King of Armenian Cilicia as Constantine II. Syrgiannes makes his appearance in history in 1315, when he was placed as military governor of a Macedonian province near the Serbian border. Despite the existing treaties, and against his instructions, he resolved to attack both Serbia and Epirus. Relieved of his post, he rebelled, was captured and imprisoned. Sometime before 1320, however, he was eventually pardoned and appointed to a command in Thrace.

=== Support of Andronikos III ===
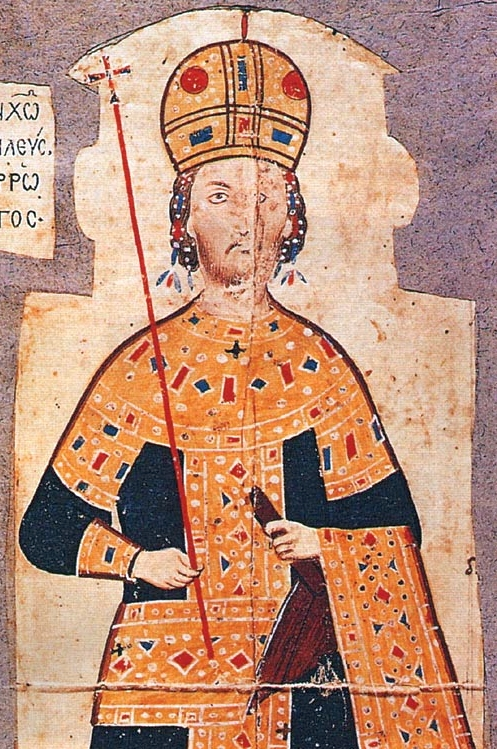
Emperor Andronikos III Palaiologos (r. 1328–1341). In his turbulent career, Syrgiannes went from being one of his principal supporters to his foe.

In 1320, following the death of Michael IX Palaiologos (eldest son of Andronikos II and co-emperor from 1295 on), his son Andronikos III was crowned as co-emperor by Andronikos II. Although initially popular with his grandfather, the younger Andronikos and his entourage of young nobles, to which Syrgiannes belonged, had by that time caused the elder emperor's displeasure by their extravagance. Their excesses culminated in the mistaken-identity murder of the young emperor's younger brother, Manuel; enraged, the elder Andronikos annulled his grandson's titles, and a deep personal rift was opened between the two.

At that time, Syrgiannes and John Kantakouzenos bought for themselves governorships in Thrace, where discontent with the old emperor was rife, and they quickly mobilized support for the younger Andronikos. Together with Alexios Apokaukos and Theodore Synadenos, they prepared to overthrow the aged Andronikos II in favour of his grandson. In Easter 1321, the younger Andronikos came to Adrianople, and the uprising broke out. Syrgiannes led a large army towards the capital, forcing the old emperor to negotiate. Consequently, on 6 June 1321, an agreement was reached which partitioned the empire. Young Andronikos III was recognized as co-emperor and given Thrace to govern as a quasi-appanage, setting up his court at Adrianople, while Andronikos II continued to rule from the capital, Constantinople, as senior emperor.

Syrgiannes was dissatisfied with the new arrangements, feeling that he had not been sufficiently rewarded for his support of Andronikos III. He also resented the greater favour shown by the young emperor to Kantakouzenos, and developed a fierce rivalry with the latter. Furthermore, chroniclers also report a story whereby Andronikos III attempted to seduce Syrgiannes's wife. In December 1321, Syrgiannes switched sides, fleeing to Constantinople. Rewarded with the lofty title of megas doux, he convinced Andronikos II to resume the war against his grandson. In July 1322, however, another agreement was reached between the two Andronikoi, which left Syrgiannes in an awkward position. His own schemes having failed, he began plotting to murder the aged Andronikos II and seize the throne for himself. The plot was foiled, however, and Syrgiannes was sentenced to life imprisonment.

=== Governorship in Macedonia, defection to the Serbs and death ===
In 1328, Andronikos III finally overthrew his grandfather and established himself as sole emperor. Syrgiannes was freed, and was able to restore himself to Andronikos's favour, to the extent that in late 1329 he was entrusted with the important governorship of Thessalonica, the Empire's second-largest city, and of western Macedonia and Albania. There, he was again suspected of plotting against Kantakouzenos, this time with the emperor's mother, Empress Maria. She lived in Thessalonica, and was supposed to keep an eye on Syrgiannes; instead, she became so infatuated with him that she had him adopted. Following the death of the Empress in late 1333, the plot was uncovered and Syrgiannes was arrested and brought to Constantinople to face charges of treason. Syrgiannes, however, managed to escape and flee to the court of the Serbian ruler Stefan Dušan.

Dušan put Syrgiannes at the head of a large Serbian force, with which he invaded Byzantine Macedonia in 1334. Syrgiannes's abilities as a general, his knowledge of the Byzantine army's dispositions and the friendships he had maintained with several local Byzantine officers resulted in the swift capture of many important Byzantine cities, including Ohrid, Prilep, Strumica, and Kastoria. The road was open for an advance towards Thessalonica, and Syrgiannes's army encamped before the walls of the city, facing a Byzantine relief force. Both sides remained encamped confronting each other for several days, but on 23 August 1334, Syrgiannes was lured away from his camp with only a few retainers and murdered by Sphrantzes Palaiologos, a Byzantine general who had defected on purpose to the Serbian camp a few days earlier. With the loss of their principal military leader, the Serbs settled for a negotiated peace with the Byzantines, which was very advantageous for them as they were left in possession of most of the cities won by Syrgiannes in northern Macedonia.

== Appraisal ==
Syrgiannes's ambition, inveterate plotting, and multiple betrayals made him one of the darkest figures of the era in the eyes of both contemporary and later historians: the 14th-century historian Nikephoros Gregoras compared his flight to Serbia with Themistocles's flight to the Persians, while Donald Nicol likened him to Alcibiades and Angeliki Laiou called him "the most evil presence" of the civil war.

== Sources ==
- Bartusis, Mark C. (1997). The Late Byzantine Army: Arms and Society 1204–1453. Philadelphia, Pennsylvania: University of Pennsylvania Press. ISBN 0-8122-1620-2.
- Fine, John V. A. (1994) [1987]. The Late Medieval Balkans: A Critical Survey from the Late Twelfth Century to the Ottoman Conquest. Ann Arbor, Michigan: University of Michigan Press. ISBN 978-0-472-10079-8.
- Kazhdan, Alexander, ed. (1991). The Oxford Dictionary of Byzantium. Oxford and New York: Oxford University Press. ISBN 0-19-504652-8.
- Laiou, Angeliki E. (1972). Constantinople and the Latins: The Foreign Policy of Andronicus II, 1282–1328. Cambridge, Massachusetts: Harvard University Press. ISBN 9780674165359.
- Nicol, Donald M. (1993) [1972]. The Last Centuries of Byzantium, 1261–1453 (Second ed.). Cambridge: Cambridge University Press. ISBN 978-0-521-43991-6.
- Nicol, Donald MacGillivray (1996). The Reluctant Emperor: A Biography of John Cantacuzene, Byzantine Emperor and Monk, c. 1295–1383. Cambridge: Cambridge University Press. ISBN 978-0-521-52201-4.
- Norwich, John Julius (1996). Byzantium: The Decline and Fall. New York: Alfred A. Knopf. ISBN 978-0-679-41650-0.
- Vásáry, István (2005). Cumans and Tatars: Oriental Military in the Pre-Ottoman Balkans, 1185–1365. Cambridge: Cambridge University Press. ISBN 978-0-521-83756-9.
