= Constantine Palaiologos (half-brother of Michael VIII) =

Byzantine nobleman

- Sebastokrator
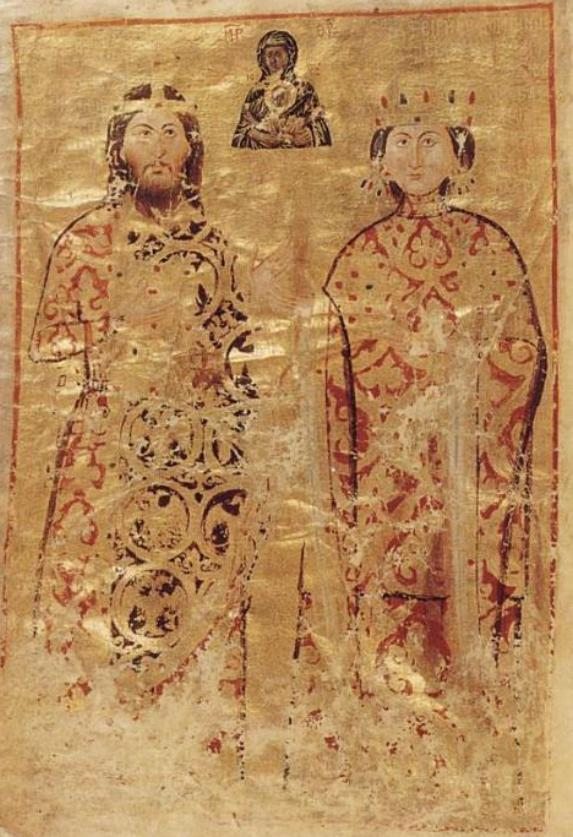
- Miniature of the sebastokrator Constantine Palaiologos and his wife Irene, from the so-called Lincoln Typicon, c. 1350

Sebastokrator of the Byzantine Empire
- Reign: 1260 – 1271
- Emperors: Michael VIII Palaiologos & Andronikos II Palaiologos

Caesar of the Empire of Nicaea
- Successor: Alexios Strategopoulos
- Reign: 1259 – 1260
- Born: c. 1230
- Died: 1271
- Spouse: Irene Komnene Laskarina Branaina
- Issue: Theodora Palaiologina Synadene
- Dynasty: Palaiologos
- Father: Andronikos Palaiologos

Military service
- Allegiance: Byzantine Empire
- Years of service: c. 1263
- Battles/wars: Byzantine–Latin Wars; Battle of Prinitza; Battle of Makryplagi

Constantine Palaiologos or Palaeologus (Greek: Κωνσταντίνος Παλαιολόγος) (died 1271) was a Byzantine nobleman and the younger half-brother of the Byzantine Emperor Michael VIII Palaiologos.

== Life and career ==
Constantine was born c. 1230, to Andronikos Palaiologos, Grand domestic of the Empire of Nicaea and his unknown second wife.

The life of Constantine is unknown until 1259, when he was appointed Caesar by his elder half-brother, Michael VIII. The following year, he was also created a sebastokrator. He commanded the Byzantine forces on an unsuccessful campaign against the Latin Principality of Achaea, where his army was routed at the Battle of Prinitza. However, Constantine had already left the region by the time of the major Byzantine defeat at the Battle of Makryplagi in 1263/1264.

Sometime after returning from the campaign against the Principality of Achaea, Constantine became a monk under the name Kallinikos. He died in 1271.

== Marriage and family ==
Constantine was married c. 1259/60 to Irene Komnene Laskarina Branaina, by whom he seems to have had five children"

- Michael Komnenos Branas Palaiologos
- Andronikos Branas Doukas Angelos Palaiologos
- Maria Komnene Branaina Laskarina Doukaina Tornikina Palaiologina. Married Isaac Komnenos Doukas Tornikios.
- Theodora. Married John Komnenos Doukas Angelos Synadenos and had three children. Later became a nun under the name Theodoule.
- Daughter (name unknown). Married Smilets of Bulgaria.
