= Protostrator =

Byzantine court office, originating as imperial stable master

Prōtostratōr (Greek: πρωτοστράτωρ) was a Byzantine court office, originating as the imperial stable master. Its proximity to the imperial person led to a highly visible role in imperial ceremonies, and served as a springboard for several capable individuals, like Manuel the Armenian or the future emperors Michael II and Basil I the Macedonian, to reach the highest offices. From the mid-11th century, the post rose in importance, becoming more an honorific dignity for senior members of the court, than an actual office. From the 13th century on, the post could be held by several persons, and ranked eighth in the overall hierarchy of the court. Throughout its history, it was a title often borne by senior military commanders. The female form of the title, given to the wives of the prōtostratores, was prōtostratorissa (πρωτοστρατόρισσα).

== History and evolution ==
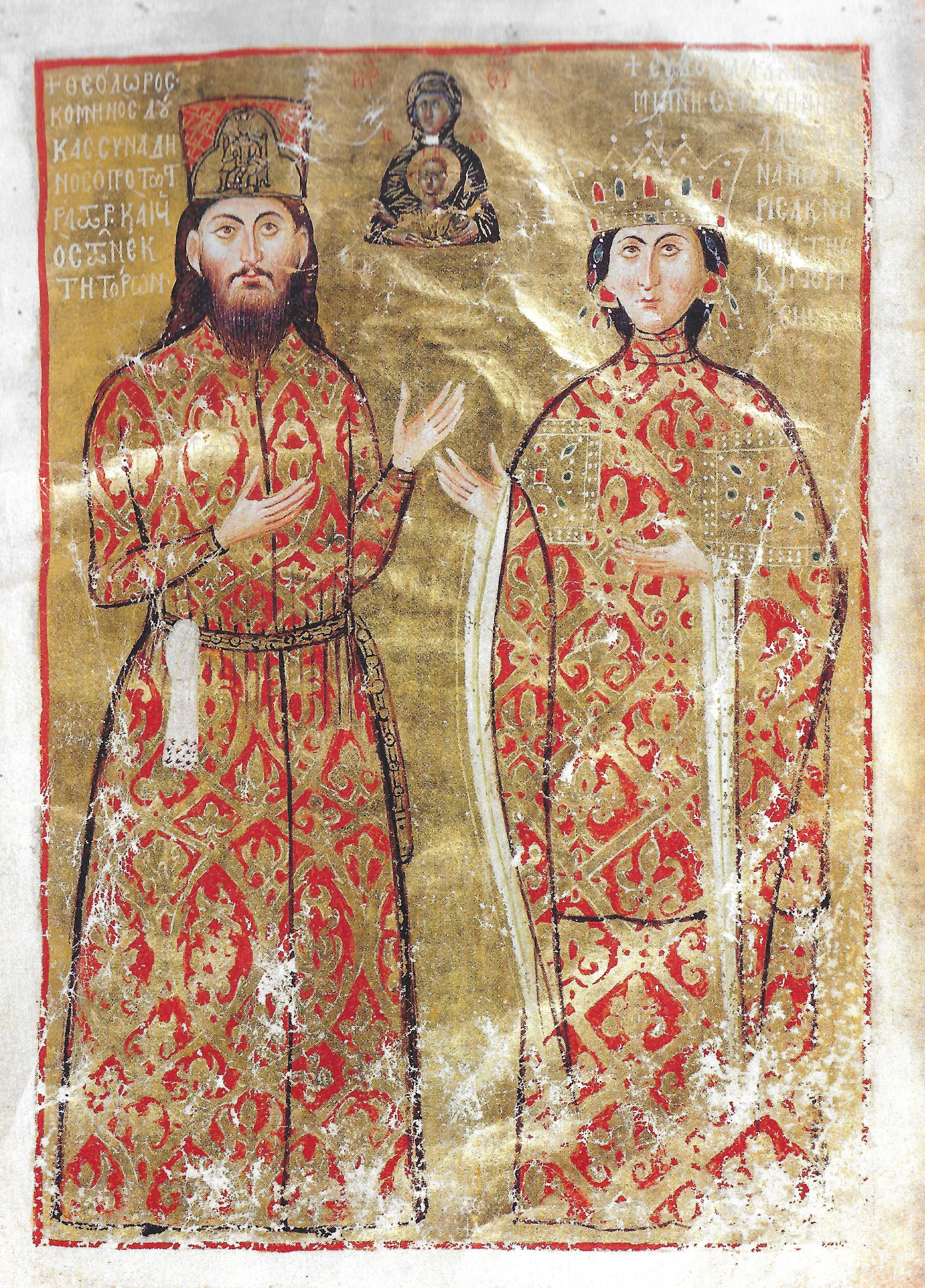
The prōtostratōr Theodore Synadenos and his wife in court dress, from the Lincoln Typikon (between 1328 and 1344)

The title means "first stratōr", reflecting the office's initial nature as chief of the imperial order (taxis) of the stratores (στράτορες, "grooms"), who formed a schola stratorum, as attested for staff of the praetorian prefect of Africa in the 6th century. A domestikos tōn stratorōn appears under Justinian II (r. 685–695, 705–711) and a prōtostratōr of the Opsikion named Rouphos in 712. The first holder of the post to be mentioned as a relatively important personage, however, is the spatharios Constantine, son of the patrikios Bardanes, mentioned near the bottom of a list of victims of iconoclast persecution under Constantine V (r. 741–775) in 765. The spatharios Constantine is also the first known holder of the post of "imperial prōtostratōr" (βασιλικός πρωτοστράτωρ, basilikos prōtostratōr).

During the middle Byzantine period (up to the late 11th century), the official place of the imperial prōtostratōr in the hierarchy was not high, but its proximity to the emperor did facilitate a rapid rise of its holders, as exemplified by the career of Manuel the Armenian or the future emperors Michael II and Basil I the Macedonian. In the Klētorologion of 899 he is recorded as one of the "special dignities" (axiai eidikai) and ranked 48th among the sixty most senior palace officials. Holders of the post could aspire to some of the highest court ranks, such as anthypatos patrikios or prōtospatharios. The imperial prōtostratōr had a prominent place in public ceremonies, riding beside the emperor on processions (along with his superior, the Count of the Stable) or during the hunt. During campaigns, he and the Count of the Stable stood by near the imperial tent, along with three stratores with harnessed horses. In triumphal processions from the Great Palace to the Forum of Constantine he carried the emperor's banner (flammoulon), preceding the emperor from the hall of the consistorium until the forum, and placed the imperial spear on the neck of the captive Arab leaders. On certain occasions, he even had the task of introducing foreign envoys at imperial audiences.

In the 9th–11th centuries, his subordinates included the [basilikoi] stratores ("imperial grooms"), the armophylakes (ὰρμοφύλακες, "keepers of the armaments" or possibly "of the chariots", from armatophylakes, according to Nikolaos Oikonomides), and three stablokomētes (σταβλοκόμητες, "stable counts"), one "of the City" (σταβλοκόμης τῆς πόλεως, stablokomēs tēs poleōs, i.e. of Constantinople) and two others, probably of the great imperial stables at Malagina.

By the mid-11th century, however, the post seems to have risen in importance, and was now awarded as an honorific court dignity to distinguished members of the court. Thus in c. 1042 Romanos Skleros, the brother of the favourite mistress of Emperor Constantine IX Monomachos (r. 1042–1054), was raised to the rank of magistros as well as the posts of prōtostratōr and doux of Antioch. During the Komnenian period (1081–1185), the post rose further in the court hierarchy, so that the historian Nikephoros Bryennios the Younger was able to remark that "this office has always been important to the emperors and was conferred on the highest personages", while the 12th-century historian Zonaras, influenced by current usage, writes, referring to the conferment of the post to Basil the Macedonian, that "this dignity was that of distinguished persons and relatives of the emperors". Holders during the Komnenian period included the distinguished military commanders Michael Doukas, brother-in-law of Alexios I Komnenos (r. 1081–1118), and Alexios Axouch, who had married the niece of Manuel I Komnenos (r. 1143–1180).

Writing around 1200, Niketas Choniates equated the office with the Western marshal, and it appears to have been used interchangeably with the latter title in the Latin Empire and the other Latin states formed after the Fourth Crusade. The office continued to exist during the Palaiologan period until the Fall of Constantinople in 1453. It remained one of the highest dignities of state, ranking eighth overall in the hierarchy, although from the late 13th century on, multiple persons could hold it.

In the mid-14th century Book of Offices of Pseudo-Kodinos, the prōtostratōr is the fifth highest non-imperial office (and eighth overall), coming after the megas doux and before the megas logothetes. Its insignia of office were similar to those of the megas doux, i.e. a rich silk kabbadion tunic, a golden-red skiadion hat decorated with embroideries in the klapoton style, without veil, or a domed skaranikon hat, again in red and gold and decorated with golden wire, with a portrait of the emperor standing in front, and another of him enthroned in the rear. Only his staff of office (dikanikion) differed, with only the topmost carved knots in gold, and the rest in silver. The knobs in the staff remained gold, bordered with silver braid. According to Pseudo-Kodinos, the prōtostratōr retained some functions, mostly ceremonial, echoing his origin as a stable master: he carried the emperor's sword, he led the emperor's horse when he left the palace, although the actual responsibility for the emperor's horses now rested with the komēs tōn basilikōn hippōn ("count of the imperial horses"). In war, the prōtostratōr was responsible for the irregulars ("those who have neither order nor their own banner") and scouts who preceded the army.

The title is also attested in the medieval Kingdom of Georgia, where it was held by the duke (eristavi) of Svaneti, Iovane Vardanisdze, under King David IV (r. 1089–1125). A variant of the title, stratoros, was also used in the Kingdom of Cyprus in the 15th century.

== List of known holders ==
Note: the list does not include holders known only through their seals but otherwise unidentified.

Name	Tenure	Appointed by	Notes	Refs
Rouphos	c. 712	Philippikos Bardanes	Recorded as "prōtostratōr of the Opsikion" by Theophanes the Confessor, he led his troops to depose and blind Philippikos Bardanes, raising Anastasios II on the throne.	
Constantine	c. 766		Son of the Armenian patrikios Bardanes, recorded as "spatharios and imperial prōtostratōr" by Theophanes the Confessor and as one of the conspirators executed for plotting against Emperor Constantine V on 25 August 766.	
Bardanes Tourkos	before 803	unknown	Attested as stratēgos of the Anatolic Theme and prōtostratōr in the Acts of Saints David, Symeon and George. He led an unsuccessful rebellion against Emperor Nikephoros I in 803, and was killed soon after.	
Leo the Armenian	c. 803	Bardanes Tourkos	The future emperor Leo V the Armenian (r. 813–820) served as prōtostratōr to the general Bardanes Tourkos until the latter's failed revolt.	
Manuel the Armenian	c. 811–813	Michael I Rhangabe	Appointed by Michael I as imperial prōtostratōr, he later advanced to stratēgos of the Armeniac Theme and eventually Domestic of the Schools under emperor Theophilos.	
Michael the Amorian	c. 811–813	Leo the Armenian	During Michael I's rule, Leo the Armenian appointed his old comrade-in-arms Michael the Amorian as his own prōtostratōr. When Leo became emperor in 813, Michael advanced further in rank and became emperor himself when his supporters murdered Leo in 820.	
Anonymous	c. 858	Michael III	Unnamed basilikos prōtostratōr, at the instigation of the Empress-dowager Theodora, who had been deposed and confined to a convent, he plotted the assassination of the regent Bardas. Discovered, he and his co-conspirators were executed in the Hippodrome of Constantinople. He was succeeded by Basil the Macedonian.	
Basil the Macedonian	c. 850s	Theophilitzes, Michael III	The peasant-born future emperor Basil I (r. 867–886) became prōtostratōr first of a wealthy magnate, Theophilitzes, before entering imperial service as a stratōr. Winning the favour of Emperor Michael III, he quickly became prōtostratōr after his predecessor was executed for participating in a conspiracy, and then progressively advanced to higher and higher office, being eventually named co-emperor in 866, and assassinating Michael in 867, becoming sole emperor and founding the Macedonian dynasty.	
Eustathios Argyros	c. 866	Bardas	An Eustathios Argyros was prōtostratōr and supporter of the Caesar Bardas at the time of the latter's assassination in 866. He is likely identical with the later general of the same name, who had a distinguished career under Leo VI the Wise in the early 10th century.	
Nikephoros Phokas the Elder	c. 870s/880s	Basil I the Macedonian	Taken into the emperor's retinue as a youngster, he was soon raised to prōtostratōr. Became a successful general, his career culminating as Domestic of the Schools in the 890s. Effective founder of the Phokas family.	
Baïanos	c. 880	Leo Apostyppes	Prōtostratōr of Apostyppes, after his master's disgrace, he revealed his crimes in a letter to Emperor Basil I, but was murdered by Apostyppes' sons in retaliation.	
Leo Sarakenopoulos	c. 980	Basil II	A general active on the Danube frontier after 971, whose career is mostly known through his seals. In the latest, he held the posts of patrikios, Count of the Stable and prōtostratōr.	
Romanos Skleros	c. 1042–54	Constantine IX Monomachos	A distinguished general and brother of the emperor's powerful mistress, he was named magistros and prōtostratōr c. 1042, as well as governor (doux) of Antioch. He remained prōtostratōr until 1054, when he was promoted to proedros.	
Constantine Doukas	c. 1071	Michael VII Doukas	A son of the influential Caesar John Doukas and cousin of Emperor Michael VII.	
Michael Doukas	1081 – unknown	Alexios I Komnenos	Grandson of the Caesar John Doukas, brother of Alexios' wife, Empress Irene Doukaina. He distinguished himself as a commander, often accompanying the emperor on campaign.	
Alexios Axouch	before 1157 – c. 1170	Manuel I Komnenos	A son of the Grand Domestic John Axouch, he married Maria Komnene, daughter of Manuel I's deceased elder brother Alexios. A capable general, he fought in Manuel's wars in southern Italy, Cilicia and Hungary before falling foul of the emperor and being confined to a monastery c. 1170.	
Alexios Komnenos	c. 1170	Manuel I Komnenos	Attested as prōtostratōr in a synod in 1170, he later became prōtovestiarios, and was the lover and de facto co-regent of Empress-dowager Maria of Antioch in 1180–82.	
Manuel Kamytzes	c. 1185 – 1199	Isaac II Angelos, Alexios III Angelos	First cousin of Isaac II and Alexios III, he served as commander against the rebel general Alexios Branas, during the passage of Frederick Barbarossa's army for the Third Crusade, and against the Vlach–Bulgarian rebellion. Captured in 1199 by the rebel Ivanko, he rebelled against Alexios III when the latter refused to ransom him and imprisoned his family. He was eventually defeated when his son-in-law, Dobromir Chrysos, defected to the emperor.	
Theodore Doukas	c. 1180s/1200s	Isaac II Angelos or Alexios III Angelos	Prōtostratōr and sebastos, known only through his seal. Guilland places him tentatively during the Angelos dynasty.	
John Ises	c. 1221–1236	Theodore I Laskaris, John III Doukas Vatatzes	Attested as prōtostratōr in documents from 1221 and as late as 1236, he briefly occupied Adrianople in 1224, taking it from the Latin Empire, but was forced to abandon the city to Theodore Komnenos Doukas soon after.	
John Angelos	1255–1258	Theodore II Laskaris	One of the favourites of Theodore II, he was promoted to prōtostratōr in 1255, from the rank of megas primikērios. He died soon after the emperor's death, possibly committing suicide when the nobles under Michael Palaiologos took power.	
Alexios Doukas Philanthropenos	1259–1273/74	Michael VIII Palaiologos	Raised to prōtostratōr shortly after Michael VIII's coronation as emperor, he led the Byzantine navy on campaign in the 1260s and the 1270s in the place of the elderly megas doux Michael Laskaris. He succeeded the latter after his death and the Byzantine victory at the Battle of Demetrias, but died soon after.	
Andronikos Doukas Aprenos	c. 1266	Michael VIII Palaiologos	Known only as the father-in-law of the Grand Domestic Nikephoros Tarchaneiotes.	
Theodore Tzimiskes	c. 1268/1290	Nikephoros I Komnenos Doukas	Prōtostratōr of the Despotate of Epirus, ktetor of the Church of Panagia Bellas, where he is depicted with his wife, and his brother John and his wife.	
Andronikos Palaiologos	by 1277–1279/80	Michael VIII Palaiologos	A cousin or nephew and ally of Michael VIII during his ascent to the throne, he was raised to prōtostratōr, possibly as successor of Alexios Philanthropenos. He refused to recognize the Union of the Orthodox Church with the Papacy promoted by Michael, however, and was imprisoned, dying in prison c. 1279/80.	
Tzasimpaxis	c. 1279/80	Michael VIII Palaiologos	His name derives from the Turkish title chavush-bashi. He originally fought for the Byzantine candidate for the Bulgarian throne, Ivan Asen III, and was named prōtostratōr by Michael VIII. Later joined Ivaylo.	
Michael Strategopoulos	c. 1280, 1283–93	Michael VIII Palaiologos, Andronikos II Palaiologos	Deposed for the first time in 1280 for consulting prophetic books on Michael VIII's fate, re-instated by Andronikos II and deposed again and imprisoned in 1293 for accusations of conspiracy.	
Michael Doukas Glabas Tarchaneiotes	between 1297 and 1302/03 – after 1304	Andronikos II Palaiologos	A distinguished general, he fought with success against the Serbs, Bulgarians and Angevins. Appointed prōtostratōr sometime between 1297 and 1304 (likely by 1302/03), he retired from service to a monastery and died soon after (between 1305 and 1308).	
Michael Zorianos	c. 1300	Thomas I Komnenos Doukas	Prōtostratōr and epi tēs trapezēs of the Despotate of Epirus.	
John Philes	c. 1315	Andronikos II Palaiologos	Nephew and friend of Andronikos II, despite having no military experience he destroyed a Turkish raid in Thrace, and was named prōtostratōr as a reward.	
Theodore Synadenos	1321/29–1343	Andronikos III Palaiologos	Friend and staunch supporter of Andronikos III in the struggle against Andronikos II, he was promoted prōtostratōr by 1329, perhaps as early as 1321. Held a succession of governorships under Andronikos III, and initially supported John VI Kantakouzenos in the civil war of 1341–47, before being forced to submit to the regency. Named prōtovestiarios, he was imprisoned shortly after, he died in 1345/46.	
Andronikos Palaiologos	1342–1344	John VI Kantakouzenos	Named prōtostratōr and governor of the Rhodope by John VI, but immediately defected to the regency. He drowned in July 1344 in the Hebros river.	
Andrew Phakiolatos	1347–1354	John VI Kantakouzenos	Of Genoese origin, he fought on behalf of the regency during the civil war, but in February 1347 allowed the entrance of Kantakouzenos into Constantinople. Named prōtostratōr by Kantakouzenos, he led the effort to rebuild the Byzantine navy in the unsuccessful war against the Genoese.	
George Phakrases	c. 1346 – after 1351	John VI Kantakouzenos	Supporter of Kantakouzenos, raised to prōtostratōr by 1346, when he defeated Dobrotitsa. He also took part in the unsuccessful assault on Galata in 1351.	
Constantine Tarchaneiotes	c. 1351	John VI Kantakouzenos	As prōtostratōr he led the Byzantine fleet in the unsuccessful assault on Galata in 1351. In 1352 he probably defected to John V Palaiologos.	
Manasses Tarchaneiotes	c. 1364	John V Palaiologos	Mentioned only in a chrysobull in August 1364 as the owner of the monastery of Christ the Saviour in Thessalonica. After his death, it was to pass to the Vatopedi Monastery of Mount Athos.	
Michael Astras Synadenos	c. 1378	John V Palaiologos	Mentioned only in an imperial prostagma regarding a dispute between the Hilandar and Zographou monasteries.	
John Palaiologos	c. 1375/76–77	John V Palaiologos	Son of the Grand Domestic Demetrios Palaiologos, mentioned in one of the letters of Demetrios Kydones due to a financial dispute.	
Chrysos	c. 1376–79	Andronikos IV Palaiologos	Mentioned only in a chrysobull as having illegally seized property of the Vatopedi Monastery in Thessalonica.	
Manuel Phrangopoulos	c. 1394 – after 1407	Manuel II Palaiologos (?)	Active in the Despotate of the Morea, he signed a treaty with Venice in 1394. According to Karl Hopf, who does not provide a source, he and acted as regent for the underage Theodore II Palaiologos in 1407. Based on a Venetian document from 1429, he had been promoted to megas doux.	
Sarakenopoulos	c. 1395	Manuel II Palaiologos (?)	Mentioned only as leading a revolt from the fortress of Greveno in 1395 against Theodore I Palaiologos.	
Kantakouzenos	c. 1395 (?)	unknown	Known only as the father of Theodora Kantakouzene, wife of Alexios IV of Trebizond.	
Joseph Vyzas	c. 1402	unknown	Stratoros of the Kingdom of Cyprus at the time of his death in Nicosia in 1402.	
Stephen Bouisavos	1411–1430	Carlo I Tocco	Albanian, leader of the Malakasioi clan, submitted to Carlo Tocco in 1411 and was named prōtostratōr of Ioannina.	
Andronikopoulos	unknown, died before 1432	unknown	Mentioned only in a document, he was prōtostratōr of the Empire of Trebizond.	
Manuel Kantakouzenos	1420–1429	Manuel II Palaiologos	Manuel II sent him as an envoy to Mehmed I in 1420, and is still attested in the post in 1429.	
Nikephoros Melissenos			Falsely recorded as megas prōtostratōr (a non-existent title) by Makarios Melissenos, who sought to promote the family's prestige. Nikephoros was actually a magnate in Messenia, became metropolitan of Adrianople and died soon after (1429).	
Markos Palaiologos Iagaris	c. 1430	John VIII Palaiologos	High-ranking official and frequent diplomatic envoy, he was briefly prōtostratōr sometime around 1430, before being promoted further to megas stratopedarchēs.	
Nicholas Phrangopoulos	c. 1430	John VIII Palaiologos	Recorded as an envoy of John VIII to Sultan Murad II during the siege of Thessalonica. He latter sided with Thomas Palaiologos against his Demetrios Palaiologos in their quarrels over control of the Morea.	
John Phrangopoulos	c. 1428	John VIII Palaiologos	Prōtostratōr, katholikos mesazōn, and generalis of Constantine XI Palaiologos during the latter's tenure as Despot of the Morea. Founder of the Pantanassa Monastery in Mystras.	
Kantakouzenos	c. 1430s/1440s–1453	John VIII Palaiologos	Unnamed son of the mesazōn Demetrios Palaiologos Kantakouzenos, executed by Mehmed II after the Fall of Constantinople.	
Leo Phrangopoulos	c. 1443	John VIII Palaiologos	Attested as travelling to Constantinople in 1443, a nephew of the Nikephoros Melissenos mentioned above.	
Palaiologos	1453	Constantine XI Palaiologos	Killed with his two sons during the Fall of Constantinople to the Ottomans. It has been suggested that he may be identified with Theophilos Palaiologos.	
Giovanni Giustiniani Longo	1453	Constantine XI Palaiologos	Commander of the Genoese troops during the Fall of Constantinople. Heavily wounded, he escaped the city, but died on his way to Chios.	

== Sources ==
- Bury, J. B. (1911). The Imperial Administrative System of the Ninth Century – With a Revised Text of the Kletorologion of Philotheos. London: Oxford University Press. OCLC 1046639111.
- Guilland, Rodolphe (1967). "Le Protostrator". Recherches sur les institutions byzantines [Studies on the Byzantine Institutions]. Berliner byzantinische Arbeiten 35 (in French). Vol. I. Berlin and Amsterdam: Akademie-Verlag & Adolf M. Hakkert. pp. 478–497. OCLC 878894516.
- Kazhdan, Alexander, ed. (1991). The Oxford Dictionary of Byzantium. Oxford and New York: Oxford University Press. ISBN 0-19-504652-8.
- Kyrris, Costas P. (1968). "Στράτορος = [Πρωτοσ]τράτωρ, or Strator. A Military Institution in XVth Century Cyprus". Επετηρίς Εταιρείας Βυζαντινών Σπουδών. XXXVI: 119–138.
- Lilie, Ralph-Johannes; Ludwig, Claudia; Pratsch, Thomas; Zielke, Beate (2013). Prosopographie der mittelbyzantinischen Zeit Online. Berlin-Brandenburgische Akademie der Wissenschaften. Nach Vorarbeiten F. Winkelmanns erstellt (in German). Berlin and Boston: De Gruyter.
- Macrides, Ruth (2007). George Akropolites: The History – Introduction, Translation and Commentary. Oxford: Oxford University Press. ISBN 978-0-19-921067-1.
- Suny, Ronald Grigor (1994) [1988]. The Making of the Georgian Nation. Bloomington, Indiana: Indiana University Press. ISBN 0-253-20915-3.
- Trapp, Erich; Beyer, Hans-Veit; Walther, Rainer; Sturm-Schnabl, Katja; Kislinger, Ewald; Leontiadis, Ioannis; Kaplaneres, Sokrates (1976–1996). Prosopographisches Lexikon der Palaiologenzeit (in German). Vienna: Verlag der Österreichischen Akademie der Wissenschaften. ISBN 3-7001-3003-1.
- Van Tricht, Filip (2011). The Latin Renovatio of Byzantium: The Empire of Constantinople (1204–1228). Leiden: Brill. ISBN 978-90-04-20323-5.
- Verpeaux, Jean, ed. (1966). Pseudo-Kodinos, Traité des Offices (in French). Paris: Centre National de la Recherche Scientifique.
