= John Synadenos (megas stratopedarches) =

Byzantine general

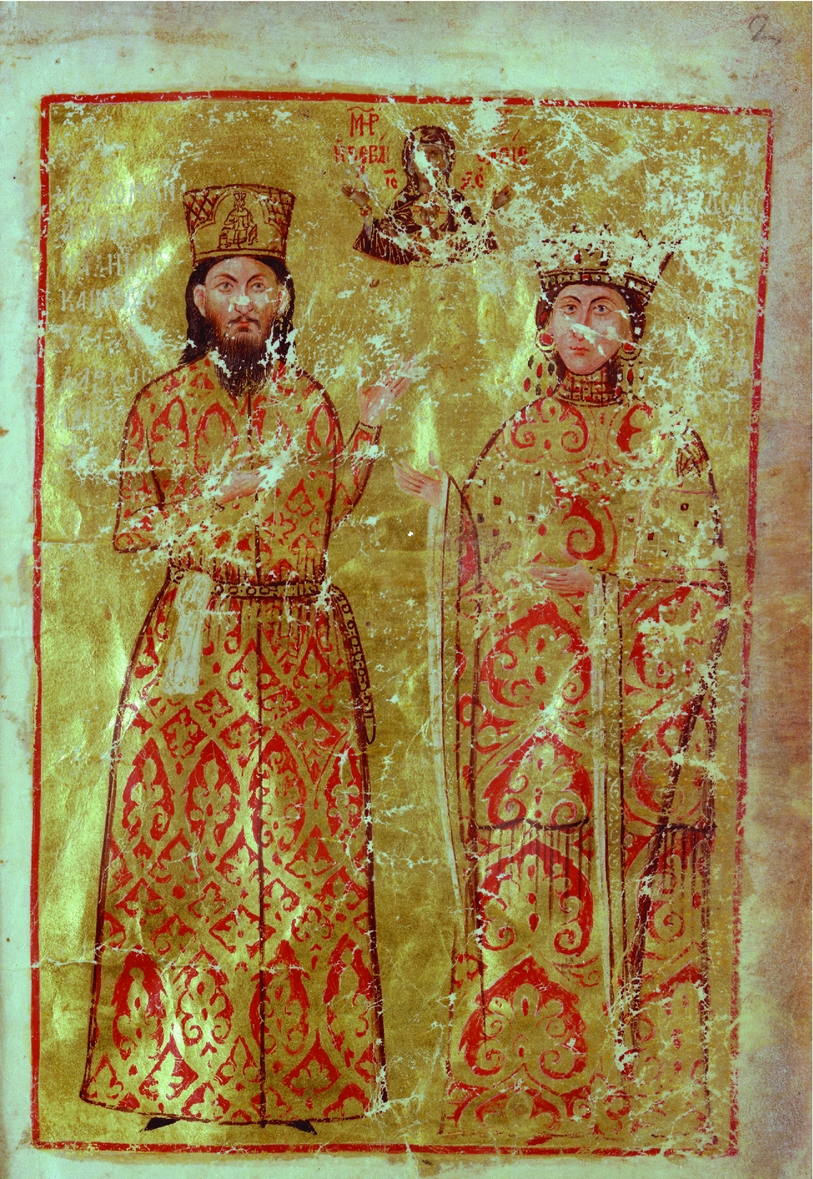
John Synadenos and his wife Theodora Palaiologina, from the Lincoln Typikon.

John Komnenos Angelos Doukas Synadenos (Greek: Ἰωάννης Κομνηνός Ἄγγελος Δούκας Συναδηνός) was a Byzantine noble and military leader with the rank of megas stratopedarches during the reigns of Michael VIII Palaiologos (r. 1259–1282) and Andronikos II Palaiologos (r. 1282–1328).

== Biography ==
Synadenos appears in 1276/1277, when, along with the megas konostaulos Michael Kaballarios, he led an army against the independent ruler of Thessaly, John I Doukas. The Byzantine army was routed at the Battle of Pharsalus, and Synadenos himself was captured, while Kaballarios was killed whilst trying to escape. He was released or ransomed from captivity, and in 1281 he participated in the campaign against the Angevins in Albania which led to the Byzantine victory at Berat. Finally, in 1283, he participated in another campaign against John Doukas, under Michael Tarchaneiotes.

Eventually, Synadenos retired to a monastery with the monastic name Joachim. After his death (sometime between 1310 and 1328), his wife, Theodora Palaiologina, the daughter of Constantine Palaiologos, the half-brother of Michael VIII, became a nun with the name Theodoule, and founded the Convent of the Mother of God Bebaia Elpis ("Certain Hope") in Constantinople. The convent's typikon (the so-called "Lincoln College typikon"), authored largely by Theodora, includes lavish depictions of the family's members.

== Family ==
With Theodora, John had four children, who were reportedly all young when he died:

- John Synadenos, megas konostaulos.
- Euphrosyne Synadene, who was pledged to become a nun since infancy, and was the second founder of the Bebaia Elpis along with her mother.
- An unnamed daughter, once reportedly considered as a possible bride for the Bulgarian tsar Theodore Svetoslav.
- Theodore Synadenos, protostrator, he played a major role in the Byzantine civil wars of the first half of the 14th century.

== Sources ==
- Geanakoplos, Deno John (1959). Emperor Michael Palaeologus and the West, 1258–1282: A Study in Byzantine-Latin Relations. Cambridge, Massachusetts: Harvard University Press. OCLC 1011763434.
- Guilland, Rodolphe (1967). Recherches sur les institutions byzantines [Studies on the Byzantine Institutions]. Berliner byzantinische Arbeiten 35 (in French). Vol. 1. Berlin and Amsterdam: Akademie-Verlag & Adolf M. Hakkert. OCLC 878894516.
- Kazhdan, Alexander, ed. (1991). The Oxford Dictionary of Byzantium. Oxford and New York: Oxford University Press. ISBN 0-19-504652-8.
- Polemis, Demetrios I. (1968). The Doukai: A Contribution to Byzantine Prosopography. London: The Athlone Press. OCLC 299868377.
