= Byzantine civil war of 1321–1328 =

Series of conflicts fought in the 1320s

- Part of the Byzantine Civil Wars
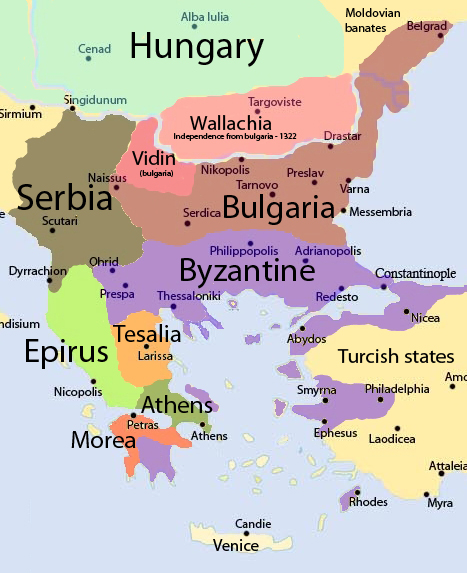
- Byzantine Empire and surrounding territory in 1307, shortly before the First Palaiologan Civil War.
Date	1321–1328
Location	Thrace, Macedonia and Constantinople
Result	Andronikos III becomes co-emperor and finally sole emperor.

Belligerents
(Byzantine Empire) Andronikos II Palaiologos; Serbian Kingdom	(Byzantine Empire) Andronikos III Palaiologos; Second Bulgarian Empire

Commanders and leaders
Andronikos II Palaiologos; Syrgiannes Palaiologos (Note: Switched sides to Andronikos II in December 1321)	Andronikos III Palaiologos; John Kantakouzenos; Theodore Synadenos; Syrgiannes Palaiologos

Strength
Unknown: Numerous Bulgarian, Serbian, and Tartar mercenaries; Smaller number of supporters; Population of Constantinople	Unknown: Numerous mercenaries; Younger nobility; Included more supporters, including non-combatants; Population of Thrace and Macedonia

Casualties and losses
First conflict (1321): unknown Second conflict (1322): few, or light Third conflict (1327–28): possibly heavier, but comparatively light.	Unknown, but also possibly comparatively light

The Byzantine civil war of 1321–1328 was a series of conflicts between the Byzantine emperor Andronikos II Palaiologos and his grandson Andronikos III Palaiologos over control of the Byzantine Empire.

== Prelude to the civil war ==
Michael IX was the son of Andronikos II, and was co-ruler and next in line for succession. He was also the father of Andronikos III and of another son named Manuel. In 1320, Andronikos III accidentally caused the death of his brother Manuel, after which their father died in his grief. The homicide and the general dissolute behavior of Andronikos III and his coterie, mostly the young scions of the great aristocratic clans of the Empire, resulted in a deep rift in the relations between young Andronikos and his grandfather.

== 1321: First conflict ==
Andronikos III had many supporters, chief among them John Kantakouzenos and Syrgiannes Palaiologos, who bought themselves governorships in Thrace, where discontent with the old emperor was high. On Easter 1321, Andronikos III fled the capital to Adrianople, where he set up his court and initiated an uprising against his grandfather. Syrgiannes Palaiologos led a large army towards the capital, forcing the old emperor to negotiate. On 6 June 1321 a peace agreement was concluded, whereby Andronikos III was recognized as co-emperor and assigned Thrace and districts in Macedonia, while the rest, including Constantinople, remained under Andronikos II, who, as senior emperor, would also direct the empire's foreign policy.

== 1322: Second conflict ==
The peace agreement of 1321 did not last long, as both Andronikoi pursued virtually independent foreign policies. Within the faction of Andronikos III a rift arose between the Syrgiannes and megas domestikos John Kantakouzenos. Syrgiannes felt that he had not been sufficiently rewarded for his support, and he also resented the greater favour shown by Andronikos III to Kantakouzenos. Furthermore, there is also a story that Andronikos III attempted to seduce Syrgiannes' wife. As a result, in December 1321 Syrgiannes switched support to the old emperor, fleeing to Constantinople. Rewarded with the title of megas doux, he then convinced Andronikos II to resume the war. After several cities in the area of Constantinople went over to the younger Andronikos, another agreement at Epibates on 17 July 1322 restored the previous status quo. This agreement between grandfather and grandson left Syrgiannes in an awkward position. Having failed in his endeavours, he began plotting to assassinate Andronikos II and seize the throne for himself. The plot was foiled however, and Syrgiannes was sentenced to life imprisonment.

On 2 February 1325, Andronikos III was formally crowned as co-emperor by his grandfather. Although there was little fighting during this conflict, the effects had a major impact on the empire: constant troop movements from levied peasants reduced agricultural production and trade was severely interrupted.

== 1327–28: Third conflict ==
In February 1327 a new conflict occurred between Andronikos III Palaiologos and his grandfather Andronikos II Palaiologos, but this time the Balkan countries were involved in war. On Andronikos II Palaiologos' side stood the Serbian king Stefan Dečanski, while Andronikos III was allied with the Bulgarian emperor Michael Shishman by the terms of the Treaty of Chernomen. Battles were fought for the Macedonian territories and after this victories these territories along with the city of Thessalonica went into hands of Andronikos III Palaiologos. In January 1328 Andronikos III Palaiologos and his commander John Kantakouzenos entered Thessalonica. After these victories in Macedonia, Andronikos III decided to capture Constantinopole and in May 1328 he entered into city and forced his grandfather to abdicate and took power in charge. Two years later the old emperor was taken to a monastery where he died on February 13, 1332.

With Andronikos III Palaiologos (1328–1341) came a new generation with John Kantakouzenos as leader, who was in charge of politics while Andronikos III was in charge of army. The civil war exhausted the empire, the value of money dropped, but the new government took care of law and courts.

== Aftermath ==
The fallout of the civil war was enormous. While the Byzantine Empire's European holdings were largely spared from external threat, the exact opposite occurred in Anatolia. The city of Prusa was lost to the Ottoman Empire and became the new Ottoman capital, while the cities of Nicea and Nicomedia were put under Ottoman siege. The Ottomans would expand up to the Bosphorus Strait, and much of the remnants of Byzantine Anatolia would fall to the new Turkish Beyliks. Only the town of Philadelphia would remain under Byzantine control, until it fell to the Ottomans in 1390.

Andronikos III immediately began to plan for a major Anatolian campaign in an attempt to partially revive the Byzantine power in Anatolia. Andronikos's plan was to land on the Anatolian side of the Boshphorus, march to Nicomedia, and then, after resupplying and gaining reinforcements in the city, attempt to lift the Ottoman siege of Nicea, enabling the Byzantines to have a toehold in Anatolia, and allowing them to begin a partial revival of their power in the region. This however, would not come to pass, as the Ottoman leader, Orhan, learned of Andronikos's plans and swiftly led an army to the Bosphorus coast to confront the Byzantines shortly after they crossed into Anatolia. The ensuing Battle of Pelekanon was a disaster for the Byzantines, as Andronikos III was badly wounded, and the army was routed and destroyed. The defeat marked the final end of any hope to restore Byzantine rule in Anatolia and Andronikos III's attitude towards the new Turkish Beyliks was to instead prevent them from crossing into Europe. While this strategy succeeded in his lifetime, his death in 1341 due to malaria would kickstart 16 years of Byzantine civil wars that would result in the severe losses of territory in the Balkans due to the Serbians and Bulgarians, the Ottomans capturing the Gallipoli peninsula and crossing into Europe and the final end to whatever chance the Byzantine Empire had to recover from the losses of the Fourth Crusade. The civil war of 1321-1328 is thus the first domino that would culminate in the final fall of the Byzantine Empire and the conquest of Constantinople by the Ottomans in 1453.

== See also ==
- List of Byzantine civil wars

== Sources ==
- Bartusis, Mark C. (1997), The Late Byzantine Army: Arms and Society 1204–1453, University of Pennsylvania Press, ISBN 0-8122-1620-2
- Bosch, Ursula Victoria (1965), Kaiser Andronikos III. Palaiologos. Versuch einer Darstellung der byzantinischen Geschichte in den Jahren 1321–1341 (in German), Adolf M. Hakkert
- Fine, John V. A. (1994) [1987]. The Late Medieval Balkans: A Critical Survey from the Late Twelfth Century to the Ottoman Conquest. Ann Arbor, Michigan: University of Michigan Press. ISBN 978-0-472-10079-8.
- Kazhdan, Alexander, ed. (1991). The Oxford Dictionary of Byzantium. Oxford and New York: Oxford University Press. ISBN 0-19-504652-8.
- Jeffreys, Elizabeth; Haldon, John; Cormack, Robin, eds. (2009), The Oxford Handbook of Byzantine Studies, Oxford University Press, ISBN 978-0-19-925246-6
- Nicol, Donald M. (1993) [1972]. The Last Centuries of Byzantium, 1261–1453 (Second ed.). Cambridge: Cambridge University Press. ISBN 978-0-521-43991-6.
- Nicol, Donald MacGillivray (1996), The Reluctant Emperor: A Biography of John Cantacuzene, Byzantine Emperor and Monk, C. 1295–1383, Cambridge University Press, ISBN 978-0-521-52201-4
- Treadgold, Warren (1997). A History of the Byzantine State and Society. Stanford, California: Stanford University Press. ISBN 0-8047-2630-2.
- Ostrogorsky, George (1969), History of the Byzantine State, Rutgers University Press, ISBN 0-8135-0599-2
