= Prosopographisches Lexikon der Palaiologenzeit =

German-language reference work

The Prosopographisches Lexikon der Palaiologenzeit (German: "Prosopographical Lexicon of the Palaiologan era"), abbreviated PLP, is a German-language reference work on the people of the last two centuries of the Byzantine Empire, from 1261 until the Fall of Constantinople in 1453, when the Empire was governed by the Palaiologos dynasty.

It was published between 1976 and 1995 by the Austrian Academy of Sciences, under the direction of Erich Trapp, with the cooperation of Rainer Walther, Hans-Veit Beyer, Katja Sturm-Schnabl, Ewald Kislinger, Sokrates Kaplaneres and Ioannis Leontiadis. It consists of 15 volumes: 12 main volumes, 2 appendix and errata volumes and 1 index volume. In 2001, the PLP was launched online as a subscription-based service and a CD.

The work is a comprehensive source on the biographies and genealogy not only of Byzantine Greeks, but also Bulgarians, Serbs, Albanians, Turks and other peoples who interacted with the Byzantine Empire at the time.
