= Rodolphe Guilland =

- Born: 5 March 1888; Lons-le-Saunier, Bourgogne-Franche-Comte, France
- Died: 5 October 1981 (aged 93); Saint-Marcellin, Isère, Auvergne-Rhône-Alpes, France

Academic background
- Education: Sorbonne
- Thesis: Essai sur Nicéphore Grégoras: L'homme et l'œuvre (1926)
- Doctoral advisor: Charles Diehl

Academic work
- Institutions: Sorbonne (1934-1958)
- Doctoral students: Cyril Mango
- Notable works: Recherches sur les institutions byzantines

Rodolphe Joseph Guilland (5 March 1888 – 5 October 1981) was a French Byzantinist.

== Life ==
Born in 1888, he completed his thesis on Nicephorus Gregoras (a biography in 1926, and his edited correspondence in 1927), and succeeded his teacher Charles Diehl in the seat of Byzantine studies at the Sorbonne in 1934, which he held until his retirement in 1958. His chief interest was in the late Byzantine period (1204–1453), particularly the Palaiologan period, and his main areas of research were the history of the Great Palace of Constantinople, and of the offices, dignities, and administrative apparatus of the Byzantine state.

== Works ==
He wrote 192 works on Byzantine subjects, spanning the years from 1921 to 1980. Many of his articles have been published in collected editions:

- Recherches sur les institutions byzantines, 2 vol. Berlin: Akademie-Verlag, 1967, xv+607 (I), 397 p. (II). Collecting 44 articles on Byzantine administrative history
- Etudes de topographie de Constantinople byzantine, 2 vol. Berlin: Adolf Hakkert, 1969, xiv+395 p. (I), 184 p. (II). Collecting 42 articles on the Great Palace
- Titres et fonctions de l'Empire byzantin, London : Variorum Reprints, 1976, 528 p. Collecting 26 articles on Byzantine administrative history

== Sources ==
- Darrouzès, Jean (1980). "Bibliographie de Rodolphe Guilland". Revue des études byzantines. 38: 271–287.
- Lemerle, Paul (1982). "In memoriam. Rodolphe Guilland (1888-1981)". Revue des études byzantines. 40: 222–223. doi:10.3406/rebyz.1982.2141.
