= Byzantine–Trapezuntine treaty of 1282 =

1282 between Trebizond and the Byzantine Empire

Treaty of 1282
Byzantine–Trapezuntine treaty of 1282
- Context: Problem of two emperors
- Signed: 1282
- Location: Constantinople, Byzantine Empire
- Condition: John II of Trebizond to drop claim to the throne of Constantinople; marriage between John II and Eudokia Palaiologina
- Signatories: Michael VIII Palaiologos; John II Megas Komnenos
- Parties: Byzantine Empire; Trapezuntine Empire
- Language: Byzantine Greek

The Treaty of 1282 was an agreement between Empire of Trebizond and the Byzantine Empire. It was signed by emperors John II of Trebizond and Michael VIII Palaiologos.

After the sack of Constantinople in 1204 by Latin crusaders, two Byzantine successor states were established: the Empire of Nicaea, and the Despotate of Epirus. A third, the Empire of Trebizond, was created after Alexios Komnenos, commanding the Georgian expedition in Chaldia a few weeks before the sack of Constantinople, pressed his claim as "Roman Emperor" against Byzantine Emperor Alexios V Doukas and established himself in Trebizond.

In 1261, Michael VIII Palaiologos (r. 1259–1282), ruler of Nicaea, recaptured Constantinople. His recapture of the imperial city reestablished the authority of the Byzantine Empire. However, Manuel I of Trebizond (r. 1238–1263) did not concede defeat, but continued to maintain his claim to imperial supremacy until his death. The titular battle continued through the reigns of the next three emperors of Trebizond, until John II of Trebizond (r. 1280–85, 1285–97) finally agreed in 1282 a treaty with Michael VIII in Constantinople after Michael had backed away from the demand to use the title of "despot", on the following terms:

- John II of Trebizond had to abandon his claim to the imperial title "Emperor and Autocrat of the Romans," and rather reign as "Emperor and Autocrat of all the East, the Iberians, and the Transmarine Provinces". He was also made to discard the attendant insignia (e.g. exchanging the red buskins traditionally worn by Byzantine emperors for black).
- the marriage of Eudokia Palaiologina to John II of Trebizond.
