= Vazelon Monastery =

Ruined monastery in Turkey

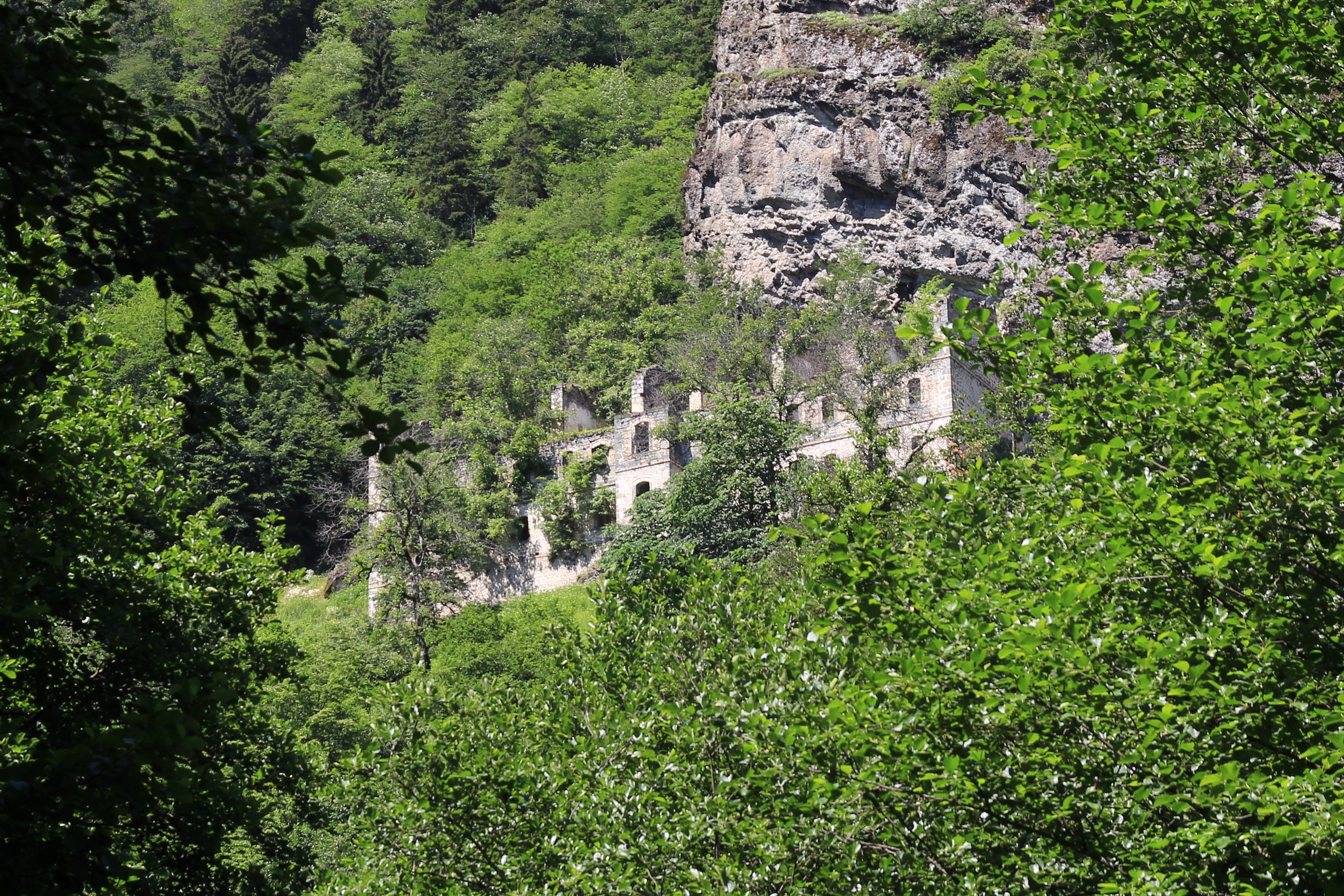
- Vazelon Monastery in 2014

- Location within Turkey

Monastery information
- Full name: Monastery of Saint John Vazelon
- Other name: St. John Prodromos Monastery
- Denomination: Greek Orthodox
- Established: c. 270–317
- Disestablished: 1923

Architecture
- Status: Ruins

Site
- Location: Maçka district, Trabzon Province, Turkey
- Coordinates: 40.76°N 39.53°E
- Visible remains: Chapels, three stories of rooms, some frescoes

Vazelon Monastery (Greek: Μονή Βαζελώνος, romanized: Moni Vazelonos) is a ruined Christian building located in the Black Sea region of Turkey. It was built in 270, the ruin is 40 km (25 mi) south of Trabzon. First Justinian I, a ruler of the Byzantine Empire, ordered the monastery to be repaired in 565, and it was renovated multiple times until the 20th century when it had to be abandoned due to the Pontian-Greek genocide and the Greco-Turkish population exchange in 1923. The current structures date from the rebuilding in 1410.

Vazelon Monastery was a center of Greek Orthodox life in the Matzouka/Maçka area, (Note: Matzouka was an administrative district, or bandon, of the Empire of Trebizond. Maçka is the modern Turkish name for the area.) retaining some control over surrounding villages until its disestablishment. Frescoes on the north outer walls of the church that depict Heaven, Hell and the Last Judgement have remained for centuries.

The monastery was attacked multiple times throughout its history. In the 500s, Sassanid Persian invaders raided the monastery and destroyed parts of it. They also killed the resident monks. Years later, during World War I, Turkish forces attacked the monastery. Vazelon was abandoned in 1923 following the population exchange between Greece and Turkey. Vandalism has contributed to the monastery's dilapidated state.

Few items remain from the Vazelon's archive. Some documents are now located at the State Museum of the History of Saint Petersburg, while others are kept by the Turkish Historical Society (TTK). Historians have used these documents to learn about life in the Byzantine Empire and the Empire of Trebizond.

== History ==
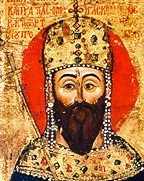
Alexios III, one of the Emperors of Trebizond. Some emperors provided funding to Vazelon Monastery.

Vazelon was built in Roman times. It was first used in 270 or in 317. After the division of the Roman Empire in 395, Anatolia (including Vazelon Monastery) became part of the Byzantine Empire. The monastery was attacked and ruined on numerous occasions by invading forces. In the 6th century, it was sacked by the Sassanids, who also killed its residents. Byzantine emperors financed the monastery in the 600s and 700s, allowing it to expand.

During the Fourth Crusade, invaders from Europe sacked Constantinople. This 1204 attack fractured the Byzantine Empire. The Pontus region, to which Vazelon belonged, became the Empire of Trebizond. Trapezuntine emperors continually funded Vazelon throughout the Middle Ages. Vazelon Monastery, along with other large Pontic monasteries, was "handsomely endowed by the emperors." The Pontus region remained under Trapezuntine rule until Turkish conquest in 1461. Vazelon continued its religious functions during Ottoman times and into World War I. However, during the Russian occupation of Trabzon in 1916-7, some monastic documents were seized. These remain in St. Petersburg.

Violence occurred at Vazelon Monastery during the last years of World War I. Turkish soldiers rounded up Pontian Greeks from around Trebizond Vilayet, brought them to the monastery, and killed them. Some women were raped before being killed. (Note: This happened in 1916, after Russian forces captured Trabzon and as Turkish soldiers were retreating from the region.) The last residents of the monastery were forced out during the Greek/Turkish population exchange in 1923. Most of the native Greek Orthodox who had avoided the Greek genocide were forced to Greece, and Greece's native Muslims were expelled to Turkey. After the population exchange, one monk, Dionysios Amarantidis, took an icon of John the Baptist from Vazelon Monastery. He transferred it to the monastery of Agia Triada in Serres, Greece. In 1997, a new Saint John Vazelon Monastery was built near the village of Agios Dimitrios, Kozani. The icon was transferred there from Serres.

Today, the original Vazelon Monastery sits abandoned. Vandalism has contributed to its dilapidated state. The St. Petersburg History Museum and Turkish Historical Society (TTK) keep what is left of the monastery's archives.

== Architecture ==
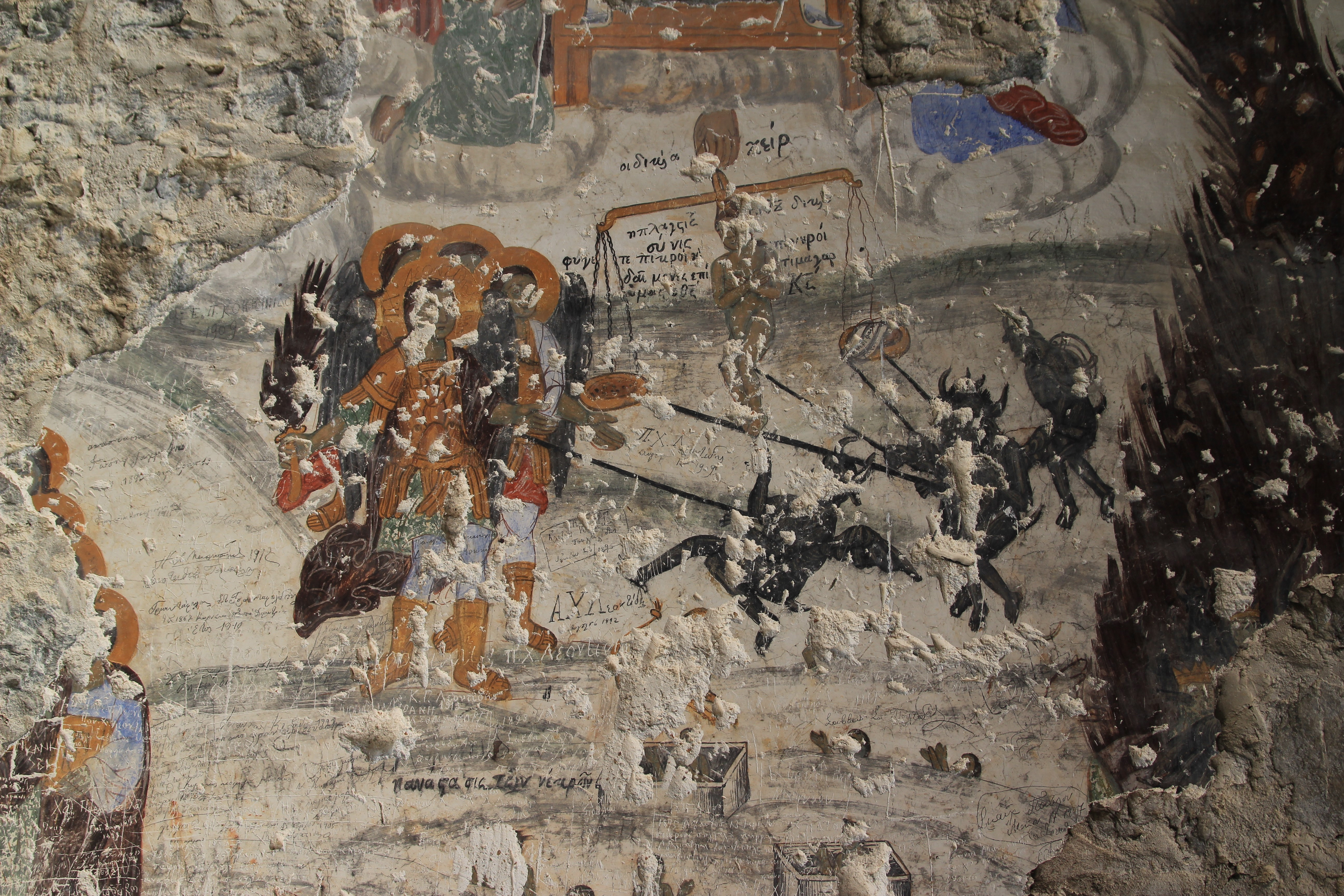
Depiction of the Last Judgement in Vazelon Monastery

Vazelon Monastery is a multi-story stone structure. It lies ruined in the Pontic Mountains near the Black Sea, surrounded by mixed forest. Many rivers snake through valleys in this region, and the area receives 100 cm (39 in) of precipitation per year. Nearby mountains can reach an approximate 2,500 m (8,200 ft) in height.

Vazelon was improved and updated from the time of its building to the time of its abandonment in 1923. The body of the monastery is made from lime mortar and local stone, possibly granite. Outside walls are thicker than those separating interior rooms. Wood makes up the roof and floors; much of this has disappeared over time. The monastery has four stories, including a variety of rooms. Vazelon Monastery once housed a dining hall, a kitchen, and a cistern for collecting water.

The monastery was once accessed by a hanging wooden ladder, which was brought inside at night to prevent trespassing. This was removed in the 1800s. Vazelon's wooden stairs were replaced with stone stairs around the same time.

The monastery contains two chapels. Atop the monastery lies one church built into a cave. At one point, this church housed a bell tower. The other chapel stands about 30 m (98 ft) north of the main monastic complex. Chrysanthos, who was the metropolitan bishop of Trebizond during the early 1900s, identified the chapel. (Note: Chrysanthos is better known for his later role as Archbishop of Athens.) He read existing texts on Vazelon Monastery and decided that the chapel had been dedicated to Elias. The building, named "St. Elias" in medieval sources, may date to 1219.

Many of the historic frescoes in Vazelon Monastery remain to this day. One ceiling displays the image of baby Jesus in a cradle. Other frescoes depict the Last Judgement, Heaven, and Hell. The separate chapel dedicated to Elias also holds many paintings of Christian religious figures.

The monastery has fallen into disrepair after years of abandonment, treasure hunting, and vandalism. Many historic frescoes have been picked away, and a bell tower that once stood atop the monastery has disappeared.

== In society ==
Vazelon Monastery was significant in medieval Anatolia because of its location and wealth. Besides being funded by both Byzantine and Komnenian emperors, Vazelon was situated on a road to Trabzon, a historic trading port. The monastery was also in the middle of rich, fertile land. It controlled the surrounding villages; this too increased its wealth. The monastery retained some leverage over nearby villages through the 1890s, during late Ottoman times.

Vazelon Monastery also saw brief military function. During early Byzantine times, Emperor Justinian I used the monastery as a look-out post because of its high altitude in the Pontic mountains. At the time, the Byzantines had some conflict with the Persian Empire, whose border was close to Vazelon Monastery.

Vazelon's primary function, however, was as a religious center. It was most likely dedicated to John the Baptist.

In Byzantine and Trapezuntine times, it was not uncommon for people to donate land to Vazelon Monastery. Nuns living in rural areas sometimes owned agricultural properties, such as threshing floors and fields; those with property near Vazelon might cede their land to the monastery. In exchange, the nuns received prayers to commemorate their lives and those of their families. These women often came from humble backgrounds. Generally, donors used the land almost as they had before giving it to the monastery. Although plenty of women made dealings with the monastery, they were in the minority. Trapezuntine women could inherit property, but men still made the majority of transactions with the monastery.

In the 13th century, a woman named Zoe Chaldena donated some property to Vazelon Monastery "for the salvation of [our] souls." As a result, the names of Chaldena and her husband were inscribed on the monastery's diptychs. In late Byzantine times, such donations were believed to ensure a happier afterlife. The wealthy and poor alike donated property for this reason. Some donated wine instead.

While some donated land to the monastery in exchange for prayers, others sold their holdings to Vazelon. One example was George Gabras, a member of the influential Gabras family. He owned property in Matzouka and sold it to the monastery in 1344 or 1345.

Vazelon remained a center of Greek Orthodox life in the region until it was abandoned in 1922/3. Even in 1920, the Maçka district of Trabzon, Turkey was 76% Christian. The specific valley containing Vazelon Monastery was 88% Pontian at the same time. Vazelon also retained control over much of its wealth and land until 1923.

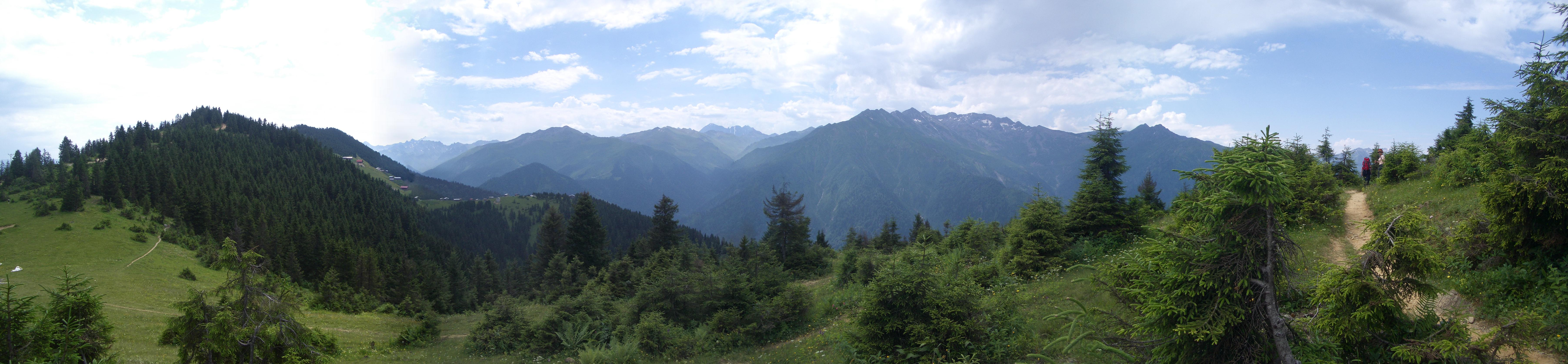
Panoramic view of the Pontic Mountains in the Black Sea Region of Turkey, where Vazelon lies

== Acts of Vazelon ==
Between the 700s and 1800s, Vazelon's monks kept complex written records. They documented a variety of property logs and current events: land dealings and donations to the monastery, interaction between the monastery and the general public, wills, decisions made by the monastery, goings-on in the public sphere outside Vazelon, and armed conflict in the area surrounding Vazelon. Vazelon recorded the wills of common people and deals between peasants. Today, these records are usually called the Acts of Vazelon, which can be shortened to Acts.

The Acts have not been entirely preserved. However, two compilations of monastic documents remain: one in St. Petersburg, Russia, and the other in Ankara, Turkey. The documents now in Ankara once belonged to the Greek Philological Society of Constantinople; however, this society was dissolved some time after 1923, and the Turkish government redistributed its various historical manuscripts in the early 1930s. The Turkish Historical Society, or TTK, keeps the monastery's cartulary.

The preserved documents tell modern scholars much about Byzantine and Trapezuntine history. The Acts are some of the only sources to preserve the names and job titles of peasants in this region, giving historians some information about the lives of average people in medieval Pontus. Names and titles belonging to various Trapezuntine citizens show the Empire of Trebizond's ethnic makeup; before 1261, around 12% of names written in the Acts were of non-Greek origin. Over the Empire of Trebizond's whole history, spanning 257 years, around 60% of names included in the Acts were non-Greek. These other names were of Armenian, Kartvelian, Turkic, Persian, Arabic, Slavic, and Italian origin. There was a marked Italian presence in the Empire of Trebizond, as many Italians immigrated to Pontus and assimilated into the local culture. Most were free peasants, merchants, or landowners. Italians traded with the Empire of Trebizond and settled on the Black Sea by the late 1200s. While a notable minority, the Europeans were not particularly numerous compared to the Asians; for every Trapezuntine of Italian descent recorded in the Acts, there were four Trapezuntines of Persian, Turkish, Kurdish, Mongolian, or Arab descent.

The Acts show that Turks settled in the central Trabzon area by 1432 at the latest, some of whom held property. However, names and titles in the Empire of Trebizond showed Turkish influence as early as the 1200s. Some titles in the Komnenian royal court, for example, were derived from Turkic and Mongolian languages around this time. Many different ethnic and religious groups interacted with Vazelon Monastery during Trapezuntine times; for example, Persians and Turks donated or sold land to the monastery, and some Turks were the official witnesses to land deals. The sedentary Turks were culturally distinct from the nomadic Turkmen tribes which lived outside the empire. The Acts of Vazelon and the Chronicle of Michael Panaretos (Note: Panaretos was a writer from the Empire of Trebizond who lived in the 1300s.) both record raids on Pontic villages by these nomads from outside the empire. The raids did some damage to the Empire of Trebizond's economy. Manpower was short; as a result, slaves were expensive compared to land and livestock. Sometimes the raiders would ransom Trapezuntines back to their families. In the 13th century, the cost to release a hieromonk’s sister was the fixed price of 850 aspers. Most Trapezuntine monasteries, even those close to the capital, were fortified; this further evidences pressure from outside forces. Raids began as early as 1261. In that year, one woman left her inherited land to Vazelon for the salvation of her and her parents' souls. This was a typical reason for ceding land to the monastery. She also had another reason for giving up her property: five of her sons had been kidnapped, leaving her unable to care for the land alone.

The Acts provide some further information on food and food exports from the Empire of Trebizond. Trapezuntine peasants had access to a wide diet when compared to other medieval societies. During the 1290s, coastal markets sold rice, dairy products, meat, olive oil, and a variety of fruits and vegetables, though some of these items were only affordable to the upper classes. The Empire of Trebizond exported black wine and hazelnuts; today, hazelnuts remain a valuable agricultural product in northeastern Turkey. The Acts also provide information on agricultural tools in Vazelon. Vazelon's monks recorded the wills of some farmers; one farmer, living in the 13th century, left behind a plough and an eliktrin (Note: The eliktrin was a sort of two-pronged fork. Farmers used it to turn arable soil on inclines too steep for ploughing.) in their will. People in the region surrounding Vazelon also used threshing floors and simple watermills.

== Today ==
Vazelon and its Acts have been of recent interest to historians. Anthony Bryer, a British Byzantinist, was one such historian; he focused on the Empire of Trebizond, studying the Acts of Vazelon to learn more about its culture.

As mentioned above, documents from Vazelon survive: some in Ankara, some in St. Petersburg. Religious artwork from Vazelon also survives in Greece: an icon of John the Baptist, which the monks took with them to exile after the Greek/Turkish population exchange, now lies in a monastery in Serres, Greece.

In 2014, Turkish professors drafted a plan to generate more tourist interest in Trabzon Province; their plan included Vazelon as a potential destination for "belief, culture" tourism. According to Turkish news sources, which may be state-influenced or censored, the government of Turkey plans to restore Vazelon Monastery and make it a tourist attraction. This is part of a larger project to revive Turkey's ancient buildings and boost faith tourism. Restoration work was slated to begin in 2020.

== See also ==
- Kuştul Monastery
- Sumela Monastery
- Empire of Trebizond
- Pontic Greeks
