= Kuştul Monastery =

Monastery in Maçka, Trabzon, Turkey

Coordinates: 40°47′47″N 39°41′2″E

- Ιερά Μονή του Αγίου Γεωργίου Περιστερεώτα
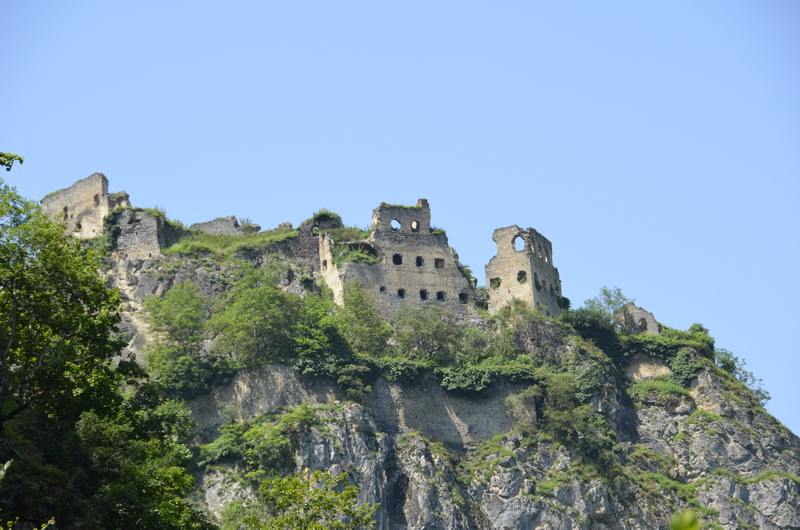
- Kuştul Monastery

- Location within Turkey

Religion
- Affiliation: Greek Orthodox Church
- Rite: Byzantine rite
- Status: In ruins

Location
- Location: Trebizond, Turkey

Architecture
- Type: Monastery

Kuştul Monastery (Greek: Ιερά Μονή του Αγίου Γεωργίου Περιστερεώτα Iera Moni tou Agiou Georgiou Peristereota, (Note: Meaning: "Holy Monastery of Saint George Peristereota" (formal name). The name "Peristereota" derives from the Greek word peristeri, meaning pigeon, because legend has it that three pigeons led the three different monks who founded the monastery to the location.) Turkish: Kuştul Manastırı) was a Greek Orthodox monastery, located near Şimşirli village, Maçka district, Trabzon Province, Turkey. The native name is sometimes also shortened to Peristera. Founded in 752, it was in use until the Greek genocide and the Greco-Turkish population exchange after 1922.

Founded in 752 CE at 30 km southeast of Trabzon, it underwent restoration after it was damaged in a fire in 1906. The monastery's Greek name is Saint George Peristereotas. The name was derived from the monk Peristereotis (peristeri meaning pigeon in Greek).

Legend has it that a flock of pigeons descended from the forests of Sourmena and guided three monks who were carrying the icon of Saint George to the place where the monastery was built. During its heyday the monastery consisted of 187 rooms/cells and a large library which housed over 7000 volumes of works. In 1203 and after 450 years of continuous use, the monastery was depopulated and for two centuries no monk lived within it. The monastery was abandoned after it was sacked by raiders.

In 1398 permission was granted by the Emperor of Trebizond, Manuel III for the monastery to reopen. Its abbots were then Theophanes of Lazia (1393-1426), Barnabas of Lazia (1426–49) and Methodios of Sourmaina (from 1449). In 1462 the monastery was partly destroyed when robbers and looters stole many of its heirlooms. Many of its possessions were also lost in the fires of 1483. In 1501 the monastery was placed under the immediate jurisdiction (stauropegic) of the Ecumenical Patriarch of Constantinople, and remained so until its abandonment.

The monastery closed on January 17, 1923, when the monks and other Greek residents were expelled to Greece. A monastery with the same name was inaugurated on June 16, 1978, in Naousa, Imathia, which is where the monks of Kuştul Monastery are buried.

The monastery is abandoned and only the base of the church survives today.

== See also ==
- Mokissos
- Vazelon Monastery
