= Constantine Gabras =

Byzantine governor

Constantine Gabras or Gavras (Greek: Κωνσταντίνος Γαβρᾶς) was the governor or doux (duke) of the Byzantine province of Chaldia, centred on the Black Sea port of Trebizond and its mountainous hinterland, the Pontic Alps, in northeast Anatolia, now part of Turkey. Gabras ruled Chaldia as a semi-independent prince between 1126 and 1140.

== Biography ==
The province of Chaldia effectively became an autonomous semi-hereditary domain of the Gabrades as his father, Theodore Gabras, preceded him as governor. In the 1090s, his older brother Gregory had plotted against the Byzantine emperor Alexios I Komnenos (r. 1081–1118) and had been imprisoned.

After service as strategos of Philadelphia, Constantine became doux of Chaldia some time, probably quite shortly, before the death of Alexios I in 1118. Constantine seems to have been less rash in his politics than his brother, though he managed to rule Trebizond more or less free of central authority between 1126 and 1140. Choniates refers to him as the "tyrant of Trebizond." Extant examples show that he minted his own lower denomination coinage. In 1140, Emperor John II Komnenos (r. 1118–1143) moved into Chaldia with the main Byzantine army in order to campaign against the Danishmend Turks. This display of force was enough to overawe Constantine Gabras and the region came under direct imperial control once more.

=== Later history of his family ===
Following their loss of power, the family of the Gabras had three options: to save their lands south of the Pontic Alps and their influence by joining the court of the Seljuk Sultanate of Rum at Konya; to save some of their influence within the Byzantine sphere by joining their new masters at Constantinople; or to move to the Byzantine province most closely connected to their former lands and, from c. 1200, free of control from Constantinople -- the Perateia in the Crimea. One member who joined the Seljuks of Rum became vizier to the sultan Kilij Arslan II (r. 1156–1192). A son of Constantine Gabras, also named Constantine, however, became a trusted minister of Manuel I Komnenos. He led an important, and successful, diplomatic mission to the Seljuk sultan Kilij Arslan II in 1162. No doubt his mission was helped by the family contacts he would have had at the Seljuk court.
