= Gabras =

Byzantine noble family

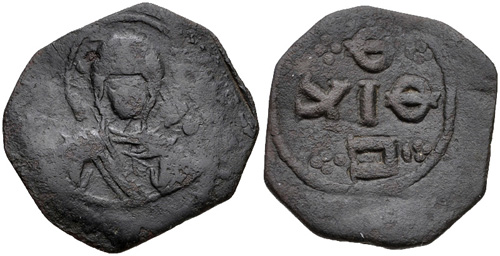
Copper follis minted at Trebizond under Theodore Gabras

Gabras or Gavras (Greek: Γαβρᾶς) feminine form Gabraina (Γάβραινα), is the name of an important Byzantine aristocratic family which became especially prominent in the late 11th and early 12th centuries as the semi-independent and quasi-hereditary rulers of Chaldia.

The Gabrades are attested for the first time in the late 10th century, when Constantine Gabras participated in the revolt of Bardas Skleros. The general Theodore Gabras captured Trebizond and ruled it and the theme of Chaldia as a virtually autonomous state (c. 1081–1098). He was celebrated for his martial exploits, and was later venerated as a saint in the region. His son, Constantine Gabras, also became governor of Chaldia (c. 1119–1140) and ended up ruling it as a quasi-independent prince. Several members of the family entered service with the Seljuk Turks in the 12th and 13th centuries, and in the 14th century, several Gabrades are attested in administrative positions in Byzantium, most notably the official and scholar Michael Gabras, known for his extensive correspondence with the main Byzantine literary and political figures of his day, and his brother John. A branch of the family also became rulers of the Principality of Theodoro in the Crimea.

== Origins and first members ==
The Gabras family first appears in the northeastern corner of the Byzantine world, the province of Chaldia, centred on Trebizond. The family's ethnic origin is unknown. There have been many speculations regarding their origin, most of them being based on the etymology of the family's name and on the location that they first appeared. (Note: Dunn, Bryer & Nesbitt 2003, p. 53: "I am more interested in location of place, rather than etymology of name, as a clue to the origins of the Gabrades. For example, I would not pursue the descent of Costa Gabras, a film director, to his 12th c. namesake"...)

Alexander Vasiliev and Alexander Kazhdan suggested an Armenian origin for the family's surname, as a "convenient solution", but the surname "Gabras" is most likely not Armenian. (Note: Anthony Bryer notes that the name isn't present in Hrachia Acharian's Dictionary of Armenian Proper Names.) Greek, Pontic Greek, Persian and Laz origins for the name have also been suggested, but these possibilities, too, are considered quite implausible. (Note: Girolamo Golubinovich argued that the name is derived from the ancient city of Kabeira, but Bryer writes that this suggestion "must be ruled out" since Pompey renamed it Diospolis and, from the 1st century A.D., the city was called Neokaisareia.) More likely interpretations include Jakob Philipp Fallmerayer's opinion that the name was derived from the Aramaic-Syriac formula "g-b-r", indicating "hero" or "man" and Konstantinos Amantos's suggestion that the name is a corruption/hypocoristic of the name "Gabriel" (lit. 'man of God'), which comes from the same root. Historian Anthony Bryer considers that the name is a cognate of the Arabic kafir, Persian gabr or Turkish gavur, terms meaning "infidel" or "unbeliever", which is appropriate for the Christian–Muslim borderlands where the Gabrades first appear.

Some historians, including Bryer, characterized the Gabrades as being "Greco-Laz". Bryer later revised his view and wrote that the Gabrades were most likely simply native Chaldians, as Inner Chaldia, their native region, was beyond the areas of either Greek, Laz or Armenian settlement. Inner Chaldia was a region with its own distinct identity: a mountainous area, it was scarcely affected by Hellenization and preserved a traditional and archaic societal structure, with tiny lordships centred on mountain strong-holds.

The first known member of the family, Constantine Gabras, participated in the 976–979 revolt of the general Bardas Skleros, and was killed in battle in 979. A patrikios Gabras appears in 1018, who was blinded for plotting along with the Bulgarian Elemag to restore the recently subdued Bulgarian Empire; it is unclear, however, what his relation with the Chaldian Gabrades is, or whether he might be a Bulgarian noble instead. In 1040, a Michael Gabras was one of the leaders of a failed aristocratic conspiracy against the Domestic of the Schools Constantine, a brother of Emperor Michael IV (r. 1034–1041). He too was blinded along with his fellow conspirators.

== The Gabrades as autonomous rulers in Chaldia ==
The first important member of the family was Theodore Gabras. A native of Chaldia, he was an energetic and valiant man. He recaptured Trebizond from the Turks in 1075, and was appointed governor (doux) of Chaldia by Emperor Alexios I Komnenos in 1081. Gabras ruled Chaldia as a virtually independent ruler, and until his death in battle in 1098, he fought with success against the Danishmend Turks and the Georgians. He became a heroic figure in both Pontic Greek and Turkoman poetry, and was recognized by the Orthodox Church as a martyr and saint. By his first wife, Irene (possibly a Taronitissa), Theodore had a son, Gregory Gabras, who was kept as a hostage in Constantinople, where he was initially betrothed to one of the daughters of the sebastokrator Isaac Komnenos and later to Maria Komnene, daughter of Alexios I. Theodore tried to kidnap his son in 1091, but failed. Nothing further is known of Gregory Gabras, but he may be identical to Gregory Taronites, who as doux of Chaldia in 1103–1106 also led a rebellion against Alexios. Another member of the family, Constantine Gabras, whose exact relation to Theodore is unknown, was also appointed doux of Chaldia by John II Komnenos (r. 1118–1143) c. 1119. He ruled it practically independently from 1126 until 1140, when John II subdued him. His exploits also formed part of an extensive oral tradition in the Pontus, but the so-called "Song of Gabras", written down c. 1900, has been shown to be a modern work drawing from other medieval sources.

The Gabrades' success in creating a more or less autonomous domain is not surprising: northeastern Asia Minor, including Chaldia, had had a long history of disaffection with the central Byzantine government in the 11th century, helped by its mixed Greek and Armenian population—the latter introduced in the early 11th century and quickly coming to dominate the Pontic hinterland. Already before the Battle of Manzikert in 1071, the renegade Frankish mercenary Robert Crispin had made the fortress of Koloneia the centre of a separate domain, and was succeeded in 1073 by Roussel de Bailleul. Thus, when Theodore Gabras appeared at Trebizond in 1075 and again in 1081, he was seen as a native leader for the Pontic Greeks of the coastlands, and his regime relied on local forces, i.e. the old thematic levies of the province. The Gabrades' Turkish counterpart and main rivals were the Danishmendid emirs of Neokaisareia and Sebasteia. On the other hand, as Bryer comments, "although rivals, the Gabrades and the Danishmendids probably had more in common with each other than they had with the Komnenoi of Constantinople or the Seljuks of Konya"; the two often allied with each other, especially against efforts by their respective suzerains to bring them to heel, and the Gabrades are remembered as gallant foes in Turkoman heroic poetry.

== Service under the Komnenoi and the Seljuks ==
Following the collapse of their independent power, many of the Gabrades came to serve under the new Seljuk Sultanate at Konya, while others went to serve the Komnenian emperors at Constantinople and mostly lost their ties to the Pontus.

Already in the 1140s, a nameless member of the family fought on the side of the Seljuks and was captured and executed by Emperor Manuel I Komnenos (r. 1143–1180) in 1146. Another Gabras, possibly the son of the former, defected from Byzantium to the Seljuk sultan Kilij Arslan II (r. 1155–1192) and became one of his leading advisors. He may be identical with, or the father of, Kilij Arslan's vizier during the last part of his reign (c. 1180 – c. 1192), Ikhtiyar al-Din Hasan ibn Ghafras. Other members of the family in Seljuk service include Constantine Gabras, possibly the son of the doux Constantine, who "betrayed" the emperor while on a diplomatic mission in 1162/3; an unnamed Gabras who was accused of poisoning Kilij Arslan II in 1192; John Gabras ("Giovanni de Gabra"), who was sent to a diplomatic mission in Europe on behalf of Sultan Kayqubad I in 1234–1236; and a Michael ("Mikhail bar Gavras") who was a physician at Malatya c. 1256.

On the other hand, the sebastos Michael Gabras was a general of Manuel I Komnenos, who fought against the Hungarians and the Seljuks, and became related to the imperial dynasty as a son-in-law of Andronikos Komnenos.

== In late Byzantium and the Empire of Trebizond ==
The surname of Gabras is still attested in the Byzantine world during the 13th and 14th centuries, but the family had lost its prestige. Some of the Gabrades of this period were peasants who adopted the surname of their masters, and most of the family members attested in government service were lowly officials.

Under the Empire of Nicaea, the Gabrades appear in Macedonia and western Asia Minor. A sebastos Ioannakios or Ioannikios Gabras is mentioned c. 1216; a megaloepiphanestatos Gregory Gabras is mentioned as governor of a village near Prilep in the 1220s, and the latter's relative, the sebastos Stephen Gabras, was active near Ohrid; a John Gabras sold land near Miletus in 1236; and a Constantine Gabras was protopapas ("senior priest") of the Metropolis of Miletus c. 1250. In the Palaiologan period, the sebastos Christopher Gabras died as a monk c. 1264/5; Manuel Doukas Komnenos Gavras is attested as benefactor of a monastery in 1300/1; other members of the family are occasionally mentioned in legal documents, epigrams or correspondence as active in Constantinople and Macedonian cities like Serres or Veroia. Gabras Komnenos, of unknown first name, held the post of "judge of the army" (krites tou phossatou) and is recorded by Manuel Philes as a "slayer of the barbarians"; a John Gabras Kaballarios was hetaireiarches at Serres c. 1348; another family member held a pronoia estate at Kalamaria before 1347. Other Gabrades were serfs (paroikoi), attached to large estates: Michael Gabras at Leros c. 1263; Demetrios and his sons Michael and Philotheos, as well as a probably related Basil Gabras, as paroikoi of the Esphigmenou monastery at Rentina (Thessaloniki) c. 1300; finally, Demetrios Gabras Chrito[u]s and George Gabras were paroikoi of the Xeropotamou monastery at Rebenikeia in the early 14th century.

The most famous of the Palaiologan-era Gabrades, however, is Michael Gabras, sakellarios (treasurer) of the Patriarchate of Constantinople and "the most prolific of all Byzantine letter writers" (A. Bryer), whose correspondence spans the period 1305–1341 and includes most of the major political and literary figures of his day. He also had a brother John, who wrote a theological treatise against the doctrines of Gregory Palamas.

A few Gabrades also remained in the Pontus, where they entered the service of the Empire of Trebizond, established by the exiled Komnenoi shortly before the dissolution of the Byzantine Empire by the Fourth Crusade in 1204: most notably, a member of the family was governor of Sinope during the brief period when it was reclaimed from the Turks by Trebizond (c. 1254 or 1258/9 – 1265 or 1267/8). Other family members are mentioned as landholders, mostly in the bandon (province) of Matzouka, south of Trebizond: Andronikos Gavras, probably in the 13th century; a George Gabras c. 1344/5; Kosmas, a military leader (polemarchos) in Matzouka c. 1378; and Theodore Gabras in Gemora in the early 15th century.

== In Crimea and the Principality of Theodoro ==
Map of the Crimea and the Principality of Theodoro (in green) in the 15th century

A branch of the Gabras family is commonly identified by scholars with the family known from Russian sources as "Khovra". This family ruled the small Principality of Theodoro, which was founded in the mid-14th century in the southwestern Crimea (in the area of "Gothia") and survived until conquered by the Ottoman Turks in 1475. The southern Crimea had been part of the Byzantine Empire until the late 12th century, and then came under the control of the Empire of Trebizond for a generation, but retained close links with the Pontic coast long after. While several hypotheses have been put forward as to how, when, and which branch of the Gabrades relocated there, none can be conclusively proven.

The first Gabras of Theodoro to be mentioned is "Stephen of Theodoro" (Stepan Vasilyevich Khovra), a "Prince of Gothia" who emigrated to Moscow in 1391 or 1402 along with his son Gregory. The two became monks, and Gregory later founded the Simonov Monastery there. The Russian noble families of Khovrin and Golovin claimed descent from them. Stephen's son, Alexios I, ruled Gothia after his father's departure until 1444/5 or 1447. He was succeeded briefly by John, possibly his son. John's son Alexios died young c. 1446/7, and his epitaph was composed by John Eugenikos. Another son of Alexios, Olubei, succeeded as prince c. 1447 and ruled until c. 1458, while a daughter of Alexios, Maria of Gothia, became in 1426 the first wife of the last Trapezuntine emperor, David.

After the disappearance of Olubei from the scene c. 1458, no princes are known by name until Isaac in 1465, possibly Olubei's son. Isaac was overthrown in 1475 by his brother Alexander due to his pro-Ottoman stance. His reign was brief, as the Ottoman general Gedik Ahmed Pasha laid siege and conquered Theodoro itself in December. Alexander and his family were taken captive to Constantinople, where the prince was beheaded, his son was forcibly converted to Islam, and his wife and daughters became part of the Sultan's harem.

== Later Gabrades ==
The name "Gabras" survived as "Gavrasov" or "Gavradov" among the Greeks in the Sea of Azov and as "Gabras" in Chaldia. The last notable members of the family are mentioned in Constantinople during the early centuries of the Ottoman Empire, as with Michael or Mozalos Gabras, active ca. 1555–65, or Cyril Gabras, megas skeuophylax of the Patriarchate in 1604. Other family members are attested in Crete and the Aegean islands. Thus an unnamed Gabras held lands in Santorini in the early 17th century; and numerous Gabrades are to be found at Chios and in Crete, especially around Siteia, until the early 19th century. For Crete in particular, it has been often supposed, although with no definitive evidence, that the local Gabrades came directly from the Pontus. In the Black Sea Region of Turkey, People whose surnames are Kavraz directly comes from Gabras family with no definitive evidence. During the 20th century, members of the family emigrated to Jerusalem and Buenos Aires.

== Sources ==
- Bryer, Anthony M. (1970). "A Byzantine Family: The Gabrades, c. 979 – c. 1653". University of Birmingham Historical Journal. 12. Birmingham: 164–187. ISSN 0261-2984.
- Bryer, Anthony M.; Fassoulakis, Sterios; Nicol, Donald M. (1975). "A Byzantine Family: the Gabrades, An Additional Note". Byzantinoslavica. 36. Prague: 38–45. ISSN 0007-7712.
- Bryer, Anthony M.; Winfield, David C. (1985). The Byzantine Monuments and Topography of the Pontos, Volume One. With Maps and Plans by Richard Anderson and Drawings by June Winfield. Washington, DC: Dumbarton Oaks Research Library and Collection. ISBN 0-88402-122-X.
- Dunn, Archibald; Bryer, Anthony; Nesbitt, J. (2003). "Theodore Gabras, Duke of Chaldia (+1098) and the Gabrades: Portraits, Sites and Seals". In Avramea, Anna; Laiou, Angeliki E.; Chrysos, Evangelos K. (eds.). Byzantium, State and Society: In Memory of Nikos Oikonomides. National Hellenic Research Foundation. pp. 51–70. ISBN 978-960-371022-6.
- Kazhdan, Alexander; Cutler, Anthony (1991). "Gabras". In Kazhdan, Alexander (ed.). The Oxford Dictionary of Byzantium. Oxford and New York: Oxford University Press. p. 812. ISBN 0-19-504652-8.
- Krsmanović, Bojana (2003). Γαβράδες. Encyclopaedia of the Hellenic World, Asia Minor (in Greek). Archived from the original on 10 May 2013.
- Vasiliev, Alexander A. (1936). The Goths in the Crimea. Cambridge, Massachusetts: The Mediaeval Academy of America. OCLC 249826006.
