= Maçka =

- District and municipality
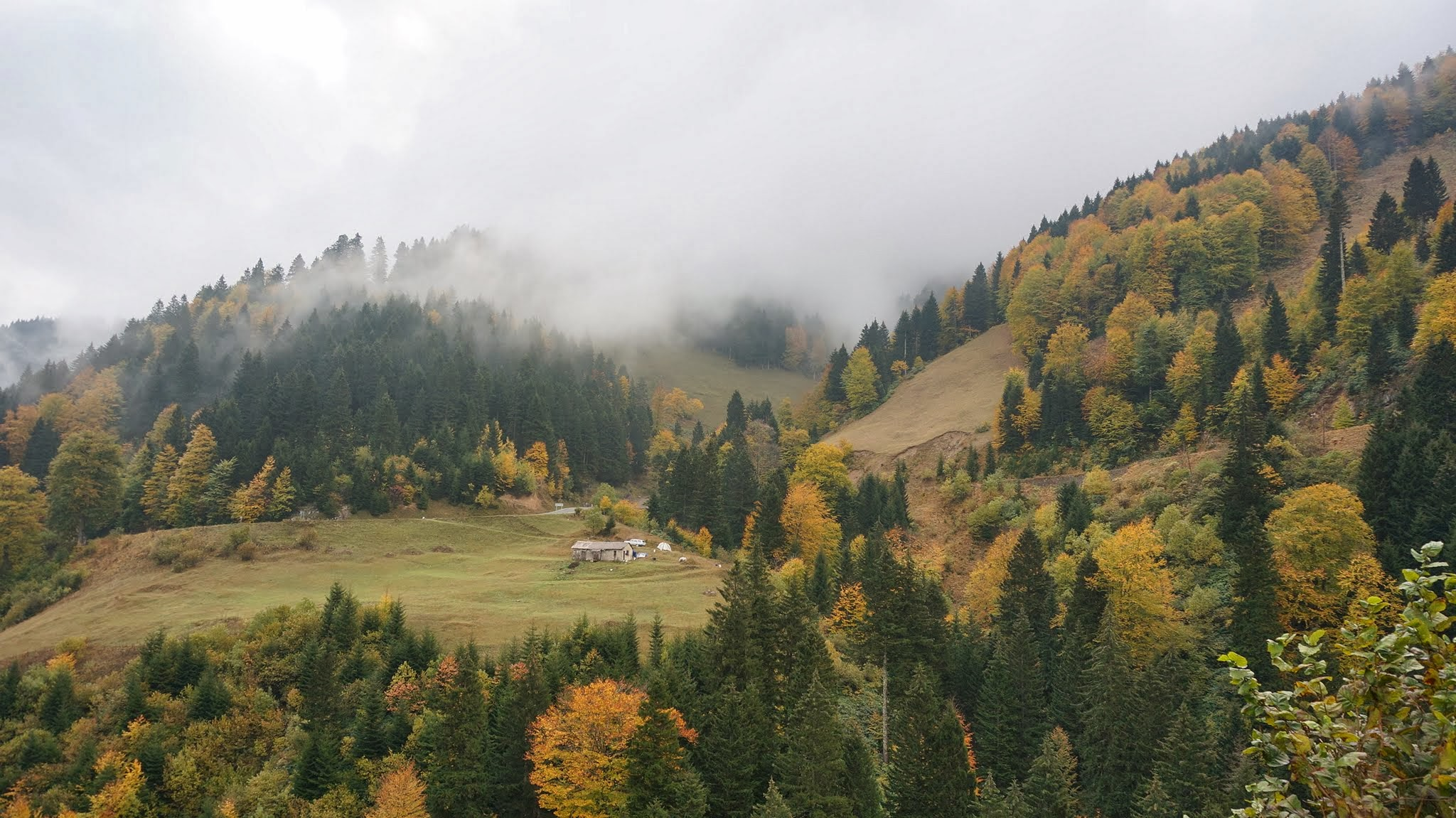
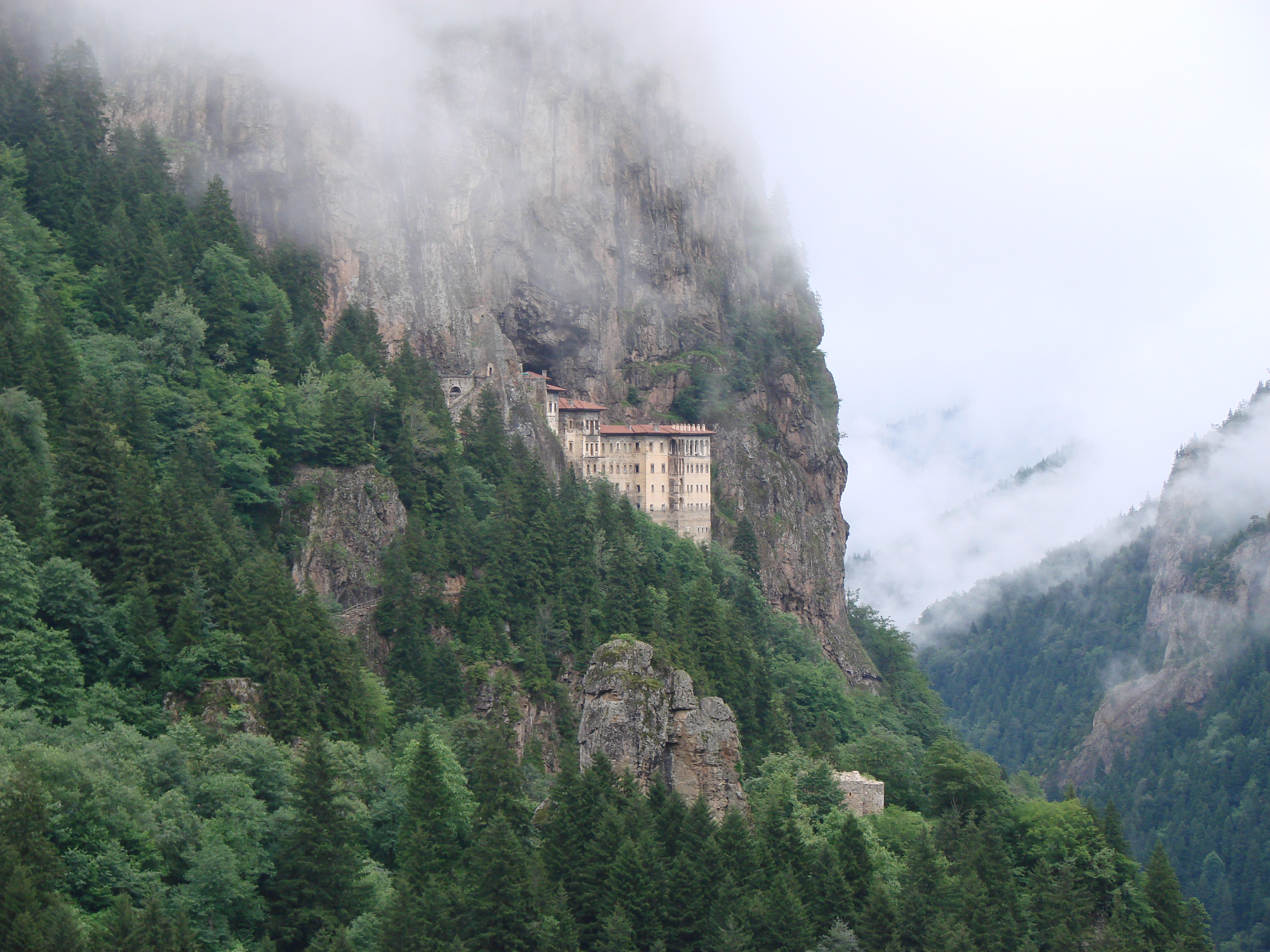
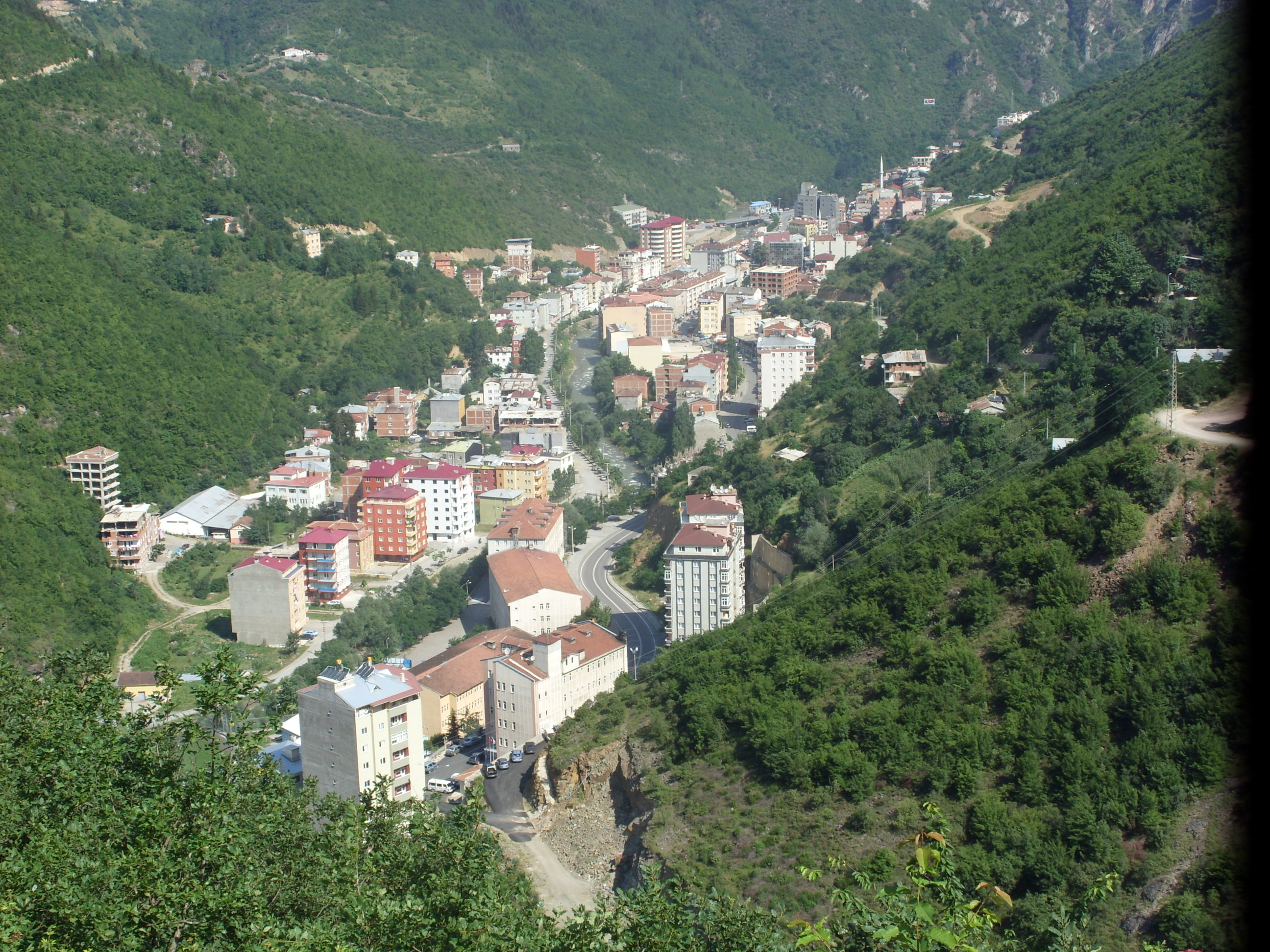
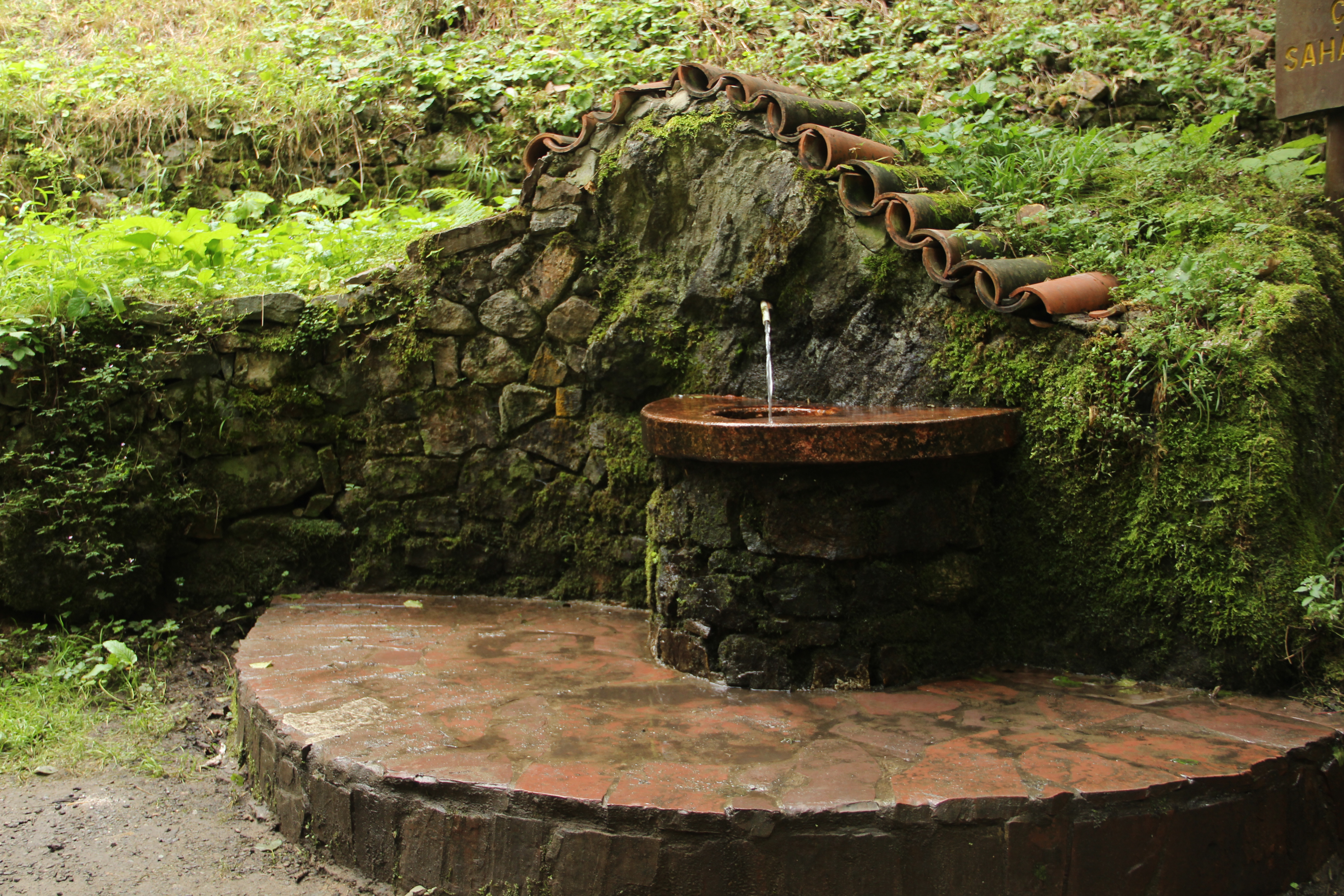
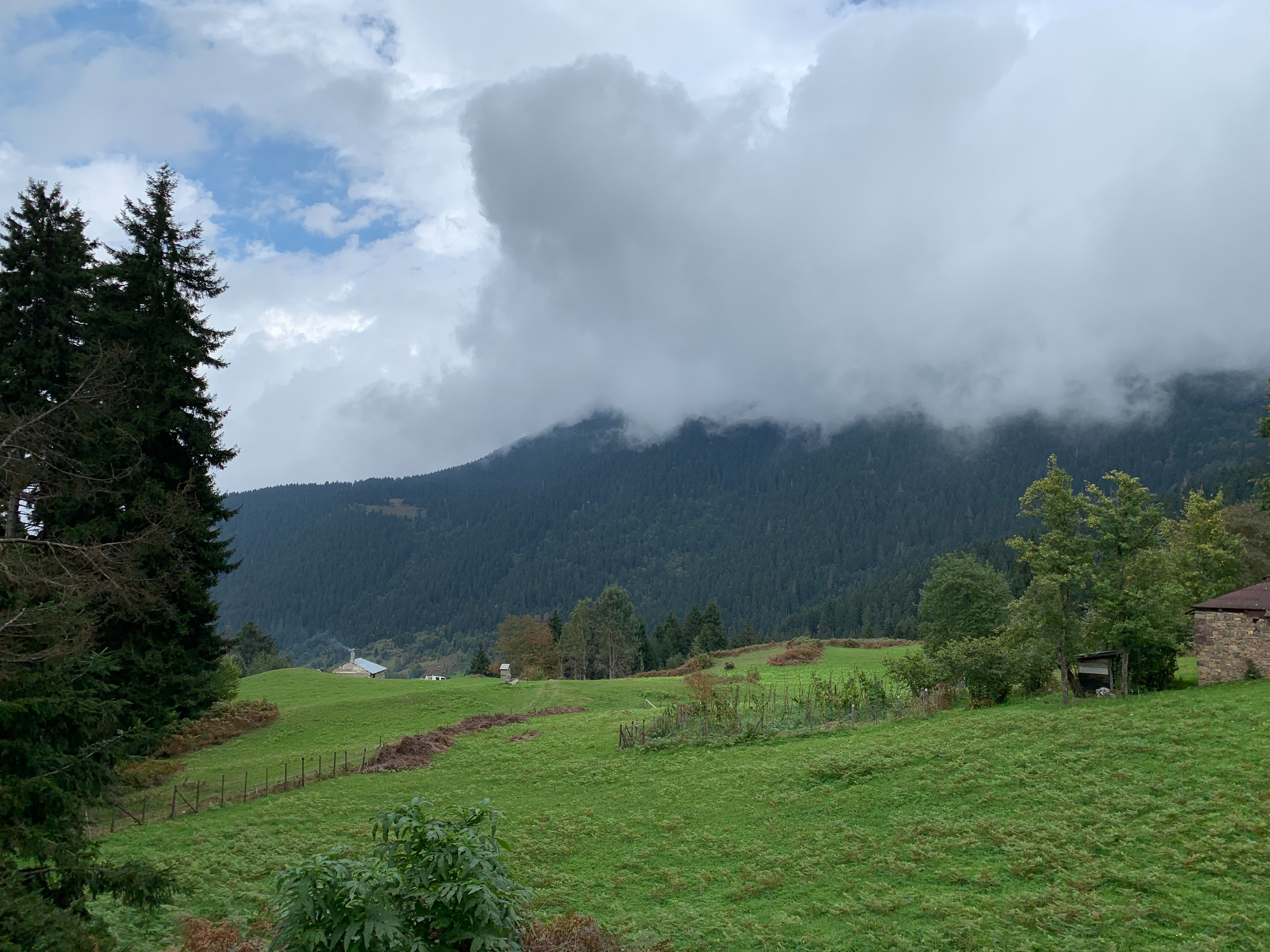
- Forests near Maçka at Hamsiköy Sümela Monastery Maçka CBD Village fountain Countryside near Maçka

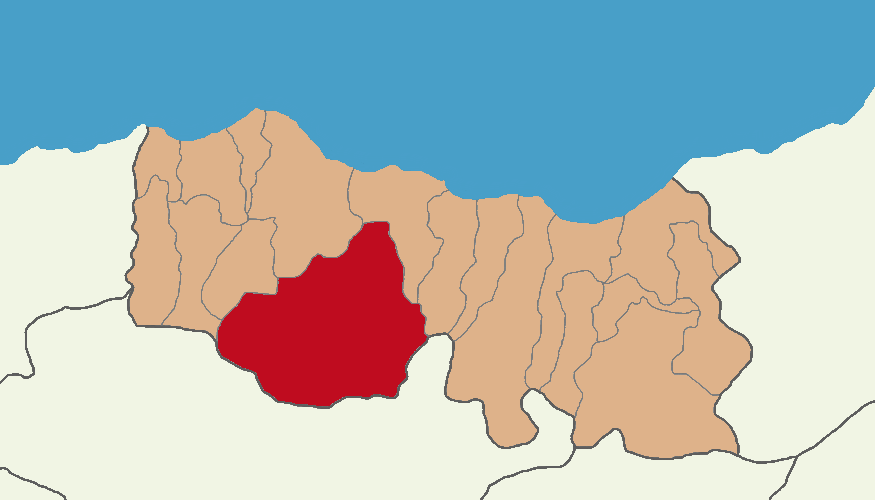
- Map showing Maçka District in Trabzon Province

- Location within Turkey
- Coordinates: 40°48′43″N 39°36′47″E
- Country: Turkey
- Province: Trabzon

Government
  - Mayor: Koray Koçhan (AK Parti)
- Area: 925 km^{2} (357 sq mi)
- Elevation: 470 m (1,540 ft)
- Population (2022): 24,709
  - Density: 26.7/km^{2} (69.2/sq mi)
- Time zone: UTC+3 (TRT)
- Postal code: 61750
- Area code: 0462
- Climate: Cfb
- Website: www.macka.bel.tr

Maçka (Greek: Ματζούκα, romanized: Matzoúka; Laz and Georgian: მაჩხა Maçxa) is a municipality and district of Trabzon province, Turkey. Its area is 925 km^{2}, and its population is 24,709 (2022). The name derives from Laz მაჩხა (maçxa), rendered in medieval Greek as Matzouka, which was one of the provinces of the Empire of Trebizond. In Ottoman times, the area formed the nahiye of Maçuka. The Greek Orthodox Sumela Monastery and Vazelon Monastery are located in the district.

== Name and Etymology ==
Among the local population, in addition to the form Maçka, a variant form Maşka is also used. The name is Laz in origin and derives respectively from the word მაჩხა (maçxa), მაშხა (maşxa), which correspond in Mingrelian to მარჩხა (marçxa) and in Georgian to მარჩხი (marçxi). Its meanings are: 1. wooden trough made to channel water to a specific place; 2. A waterfall; 3. A wooden trough made for drinking water from springs; 4. A side channel carrying water to a mill; 5. Shallow water; 6. A water-bearing rock.

== Composition ==
There are 67 neighbourhoods in Maçka District:

- Akarsu
- Akmescit
- Alaçam
- Alataş
- Altındere
- Anayurt
- Ardıçlıyayla
- Armağan
- Atasu
- Bağışlı
- Bahçekaya
- Bakımlı
- Bakırcılar
- Barışlı
- Başar
- Çamlıdüz
- Çatak
- Çayırlar
- Çeşmeler
- Çıralı
- Coşandere
- Dikkaya
- Erginköy
- Esiroğlu
- Fatih
- Gayretli
- Günay
- Güney
- Gürgenağaç
- Güzelce
- Güzelyayla
- Hamsiköy
- Hızarlı
- Kapıköy
- Kaynarca
- Kırantaş
- Kiremitli
- Konak
- Köprüyanı
- Kozağaç
- Kuşçu
- Mataracı
- Merkez
- Ocaklı
- Oğulağaç
- Öğütlü
- Ormaniçi
- Ormanüstü
- Örnekalan
- Ortaköy
- Reşadiye
- Sevinç
- Şimşirli
- Sındıran
- Sukenarı
- Temelli
- Üçgedik
- Yaylabaşı
- Yazılıtaş
- Yazlık
- Yeni Atasu
- Yeniköy
- Yeşiltepe Mahallesi
- Yeşilyurt
- Yukarıköy
- Yüzüncüyıl
- Zaferli

== Gallery ==
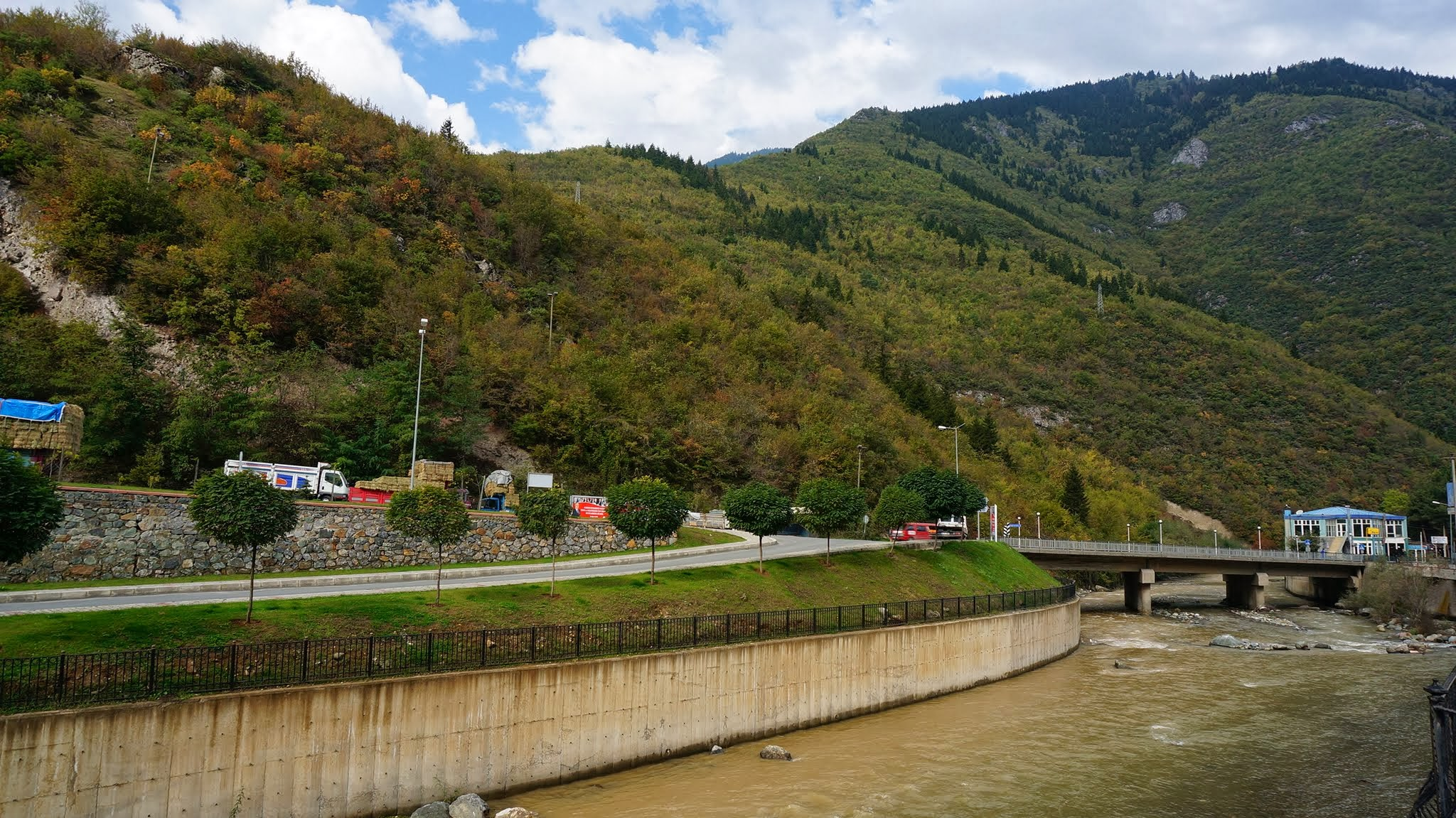
City center of Maçka

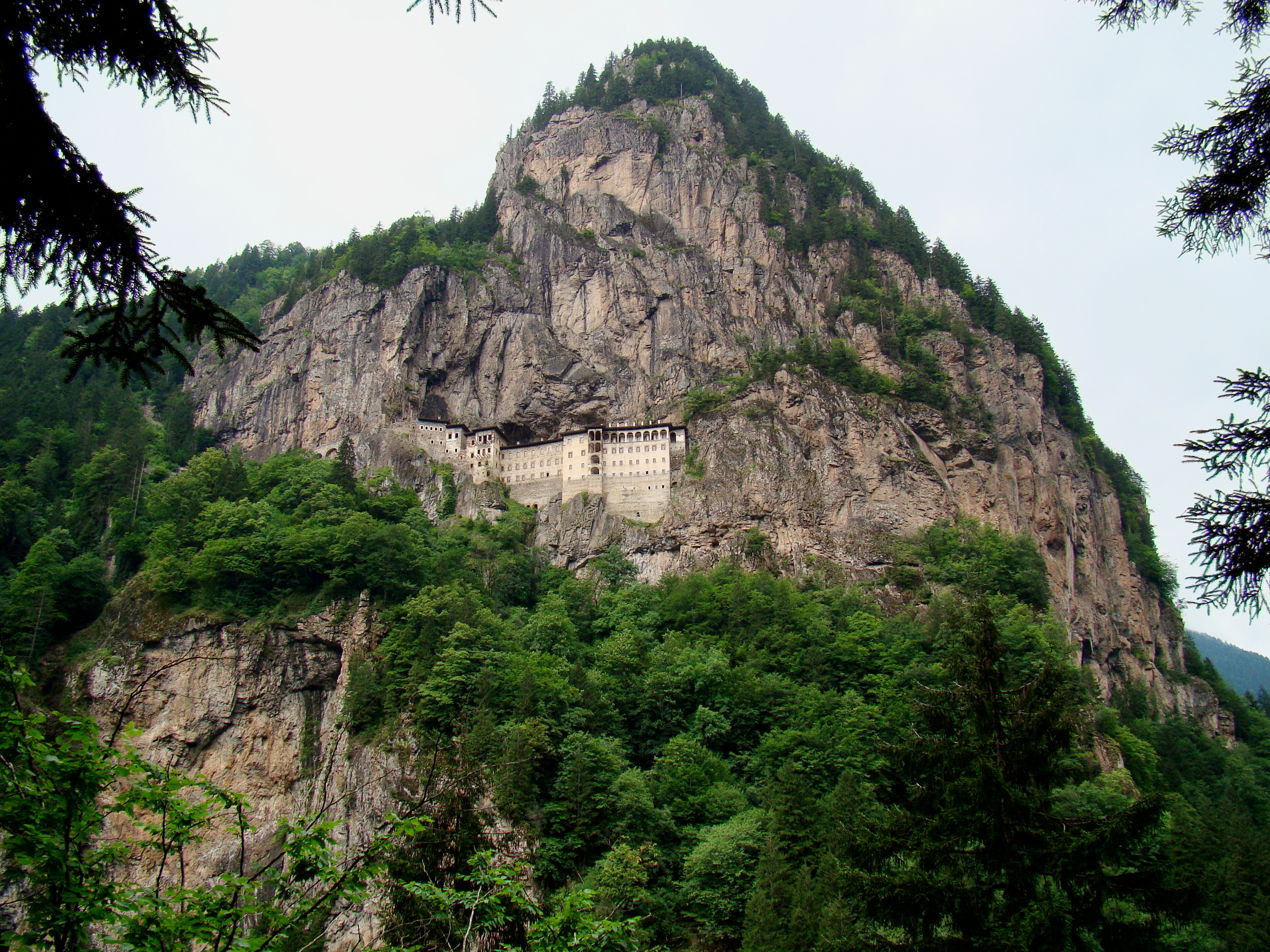
Sumela Monastery in the Pontic Mountains

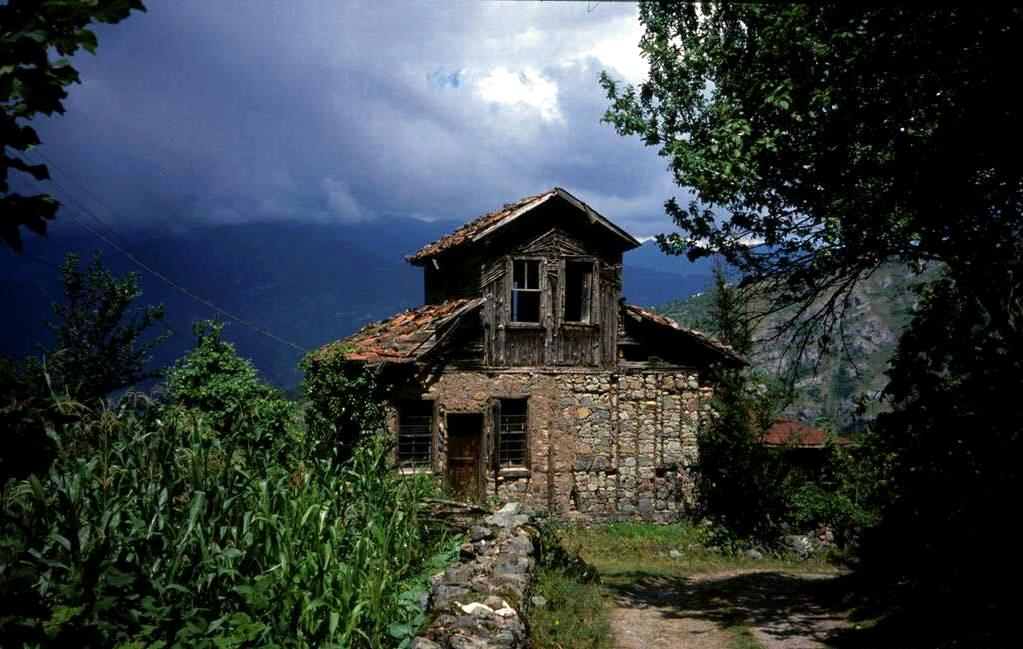
A traditional rural Pontic house in Livera (Yazlık)

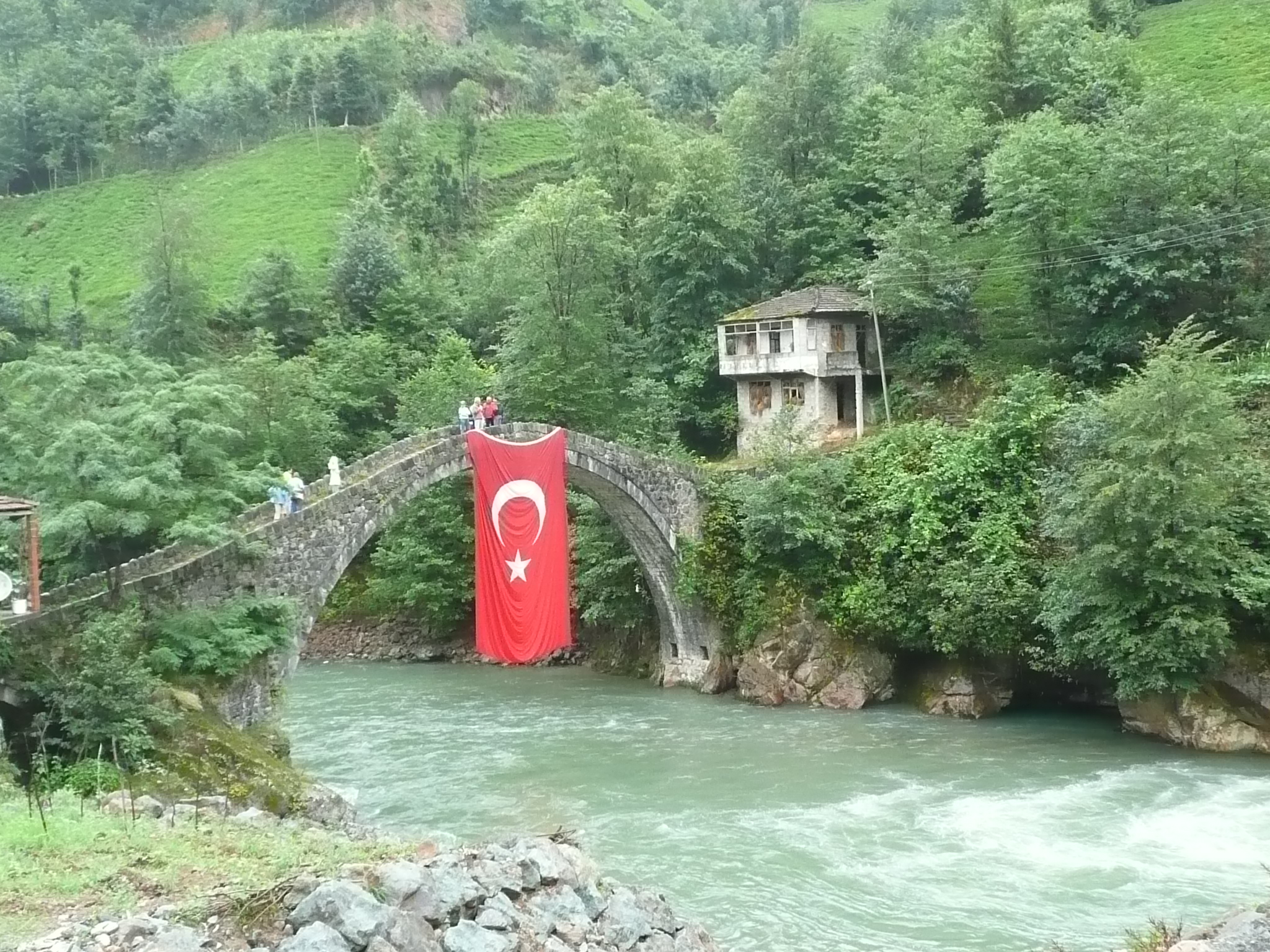
Hamsiköy

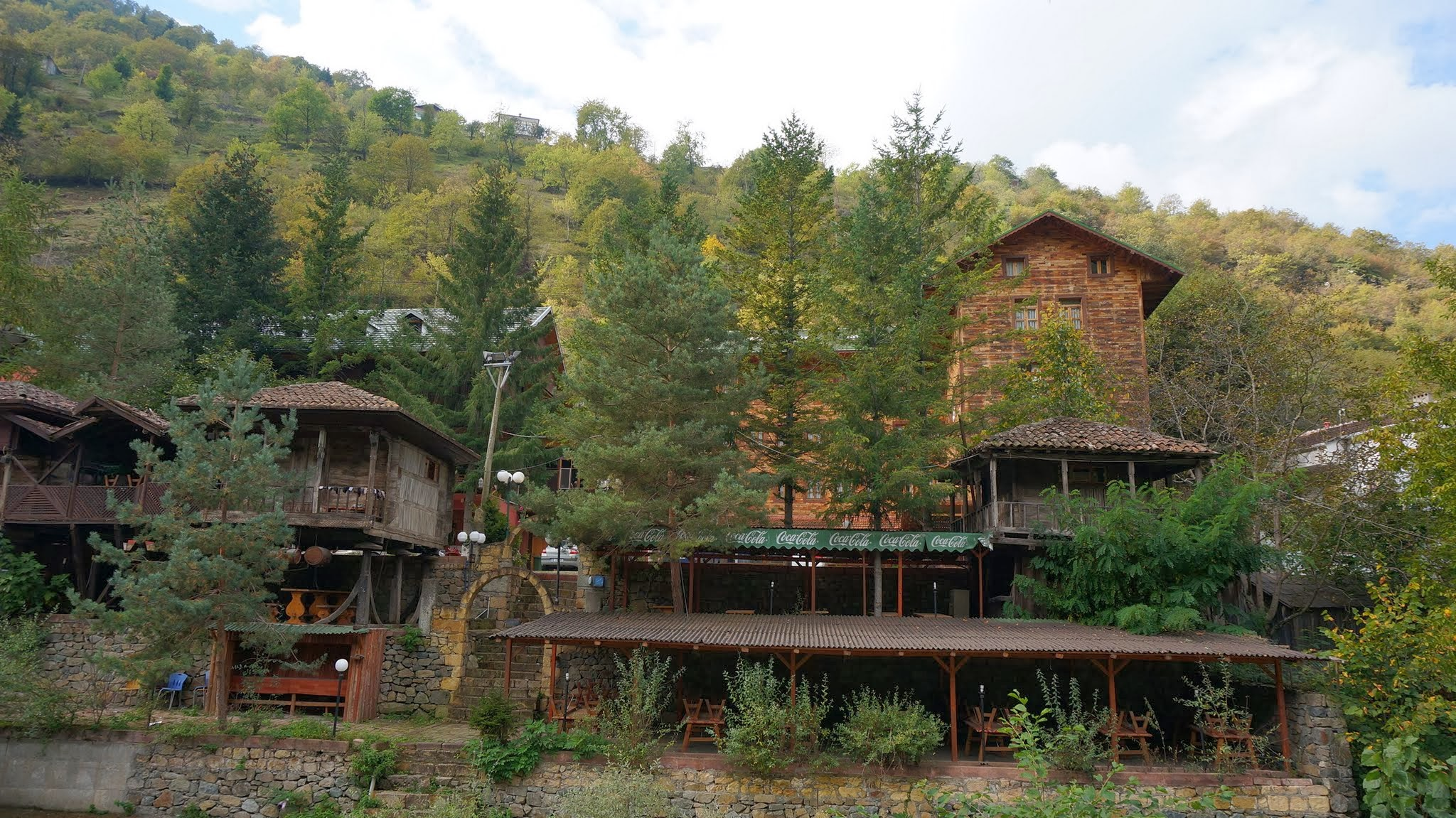
Yazlık

== Twin towns – Sister cities ==
Maçka is twinned with:

- Karesi, Turkey (since 2015)
