= Sergey Karpov =

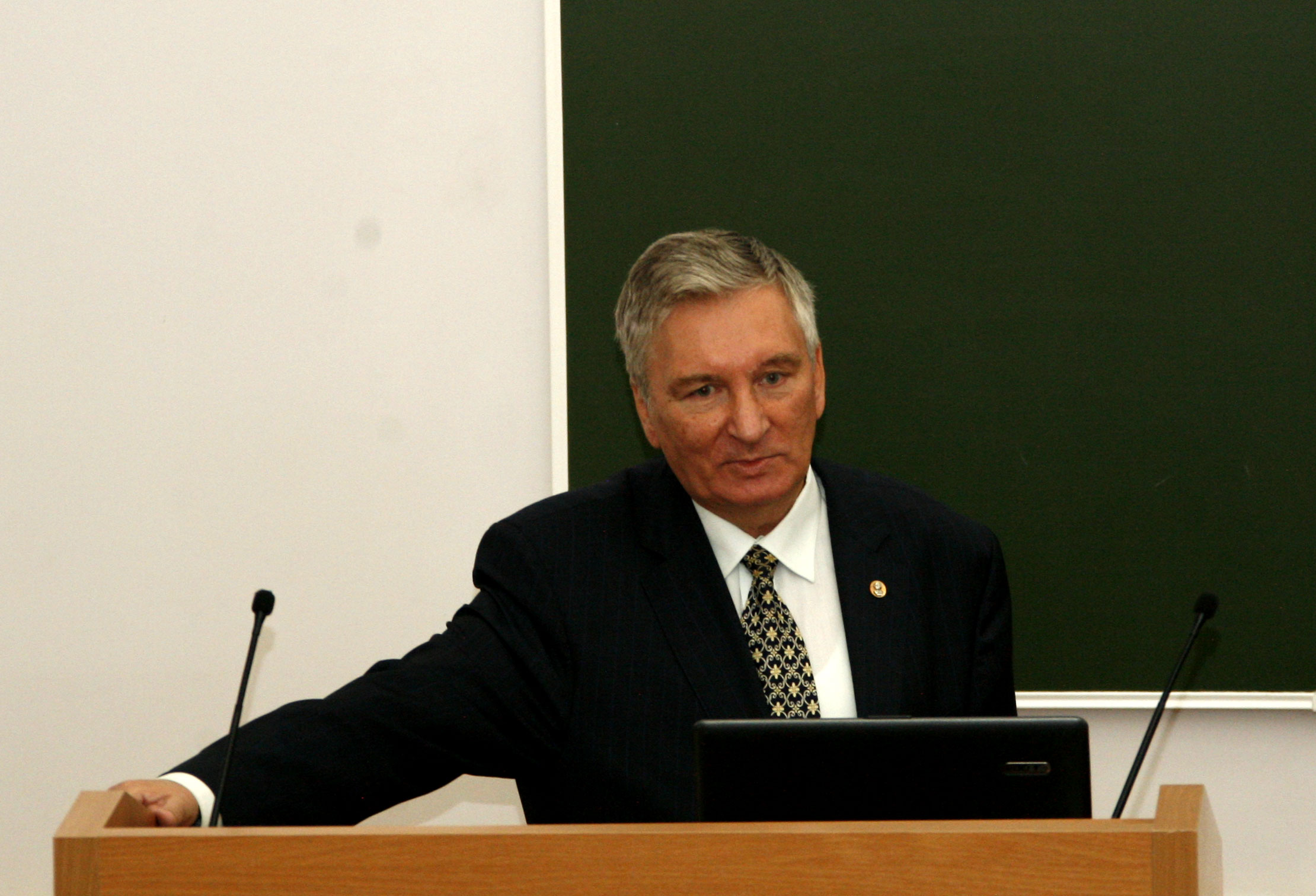

Sergey Pavlovich Karpov (Russian: Сергей Павлович Карпов; born 1948) is a leading Russian Byzantinist who specializes in the Empire of Trebizond and the history of Gazaria. His work in Italian archives helped bring to light the records of Genoese and Venetian notaries and accountants concerning their Black Sea colonies. Some of his monographs are available in Italian translation. He was awarded a State Prize in 1996 and was elected into the Russian Academy of Sciences in 2003. Karpov was Dean of the Department of History of the Moscow State University from 1995 until 2015.

== Monographs ==
- Sergei Karpov. Трапезундская империя и западноевропейские государства, 1204-1461. ("The Empire of Trebizond and the nations of Western Europe, 1204–1461.") Moscow, 1981, 231 pp.
- L' impero di Trebisonda, Venezia, Genova e Roma, 1204-1461. Rapporti politici, diplomatici e commerciali. Roma, 1986. 321 pp.
- La Navigazione Veneziana nel Mar Nero XIII-XV sec. Ravenna, 2000. 207 pp.
- Sergei Karpov. История Трапезундской империи ("A history of the empire of Trebizond"). Saint Petersburg, 2007, 656 pp.

== Articles ==
- Karpov, Serghei (2017). Ortalli, Gherardo; Sopracasa, Alessio (eds.). "La Tana veneziana. Vita economica e rapportisociali: i tentativi di superare la grande crisi della metà del Trecento". Rapporti Mediterranei, Pratiche Documentarie, Presenze Veneziane: Le Reti Economiche e Culturali (XIV - XVI Secolo). Estratto (in Italian). Venezia: Istituto Veneto di Scienze, Lettere ed Arti: 237–252. ISBN 978-88-95996-69-1 – via Academia.edu.
