= Matzouka =

Anatolian polity

Matzouka Ματζούκα
- Bandon of the Empire of Trebizond
- 1204–1461
- Historical era: Middle Ages
  - Established: 1204
  - Disestablished: 1461
Succeeded by
Ottoman Empire
- Today part of: Turkey

The Matzouka (Greek: Ματζούκα, Turkish: Maçuka) was a geographical area and administrative subdivision (bandon) of the medieval Empire of Trebizond (1204–1461) in northeastern Anatolia (modern Turkey). Its administrative capital was at Dikaisimon (modern Cevıslık). The area resisted for a while after the Ottoman conquest of Trebizond in 1461, but eventually submitted and became a nahiye of the Ottoman Empire.

It is not attested before the 13th century, but it is possible that it existed already as part of the middle Byzantine thema of Chaldia, as the medieval administrative districts in the area coincided with geographical regions and have remained consistent to the present day.

The boundaries of Matzouka extended south and southwest of Mount Minthrion (modern Boztepe), its southern limit along a line stretching from the Zigana summit of Mount Paryadres in the west and the Pontic Gates (modern Kolabat Bogazi) in the east.

Its strategic importance was great, as it guarded the approaches to Trebizond, the capital of the empire, and as Matzouka was the heartland of the Empire of Trebizond. Around the capital of the district were the forests where the emperors had their summer palaces. The local inhabitants were peasants and pastoralists, and had a reputation as warriors, playing a notable role in the repulsion of Turkish raids.

Between 1384 and 1408, the new bandon of Palaiomatzouka (Παλαιοματζούκα, "Old Matzouka") was carved from its southern portion.

== See also ==
- Maçka

== Sources ==
- Bryer, Anthony M.; Winfield, David C. (1985). The Byzantine Monuments and Topography of the Pontos, Volume One. With Maps and Plans by Richard Anderson and Drawings by June Winfield. Washington, DC: Dumbarton Oaks Research Library and Collection. ISBN 0-88402-122-X.
- Bryer, Anthony (1986). "Late Byzantine Rural Society in Matzouka". In Bryer, Anthony; Lowry, Heath (eds.). Continuity and Change in Late Byzantine and Early Ottoman Society: Papers given at a Symposium at Dumbarton Oaks in May 1982. Birmingham and Washington, DC: University of Birmingham and Dumbarton Oaks Research Library and Collection. pp. 53–95. ISBN 0-7044-0748-5.
- Jennings, Ronald; Bryer, Anthony (1986). "The Society and Economy of Maçuka in the Ottoman Judicial Registers of Trabzon, 1560–1640". In Bryer, Anthony; Lowry, Heath (eds.). Continuity and Change in Late Byzantine and Early Ottoman Society: Papers given at a Symposium at Dumbarton Oaks in May 1982. Birmingham and Washington, DC: University of Birmingham and Dumbarton Oaks Research Library and Collection. pp. 129–158. ISBN 0-7044-0748-5.
- Lowry, Heath (1986). "Privilege and Property in Ottoman Maçuka during the Opening Decades of the Tourkokratia, 1461-1553". In Bryer, Anthony; Lowry, Heath (eds.). Continuity and Change in Late Byzantine and Early Ottoman Society: Papers given at a Symposium at Dumbarton Oaks in May 1982. Birmingham and Washington, DC: University of Birmingham and Dumbarton Oaks Research Library and Collection. pp. 97–128. ISBN 0-7044-0748-5.
- Lambakis, Stylianos (2003). "Ματζούκας Βάνδον". Encyclopedia of the Hellenic World, Asia Minor (in Greek). Foundation of the Hellenic World.
