= Empire of Trebizond =

Byzantine rump state (1204–1461)

- 1204–1461
- Double-headed eagle flag as depicted in Western portolans

- Map of the Empire of Trebizond shortly after the foundation of the Latin Empire in 1204, featuring the short-lived conquests in western Anatolia by David Komnenos (later reconquered by the Empire of Nicaea) and Sinope (later conquered by the Sultanate of Rum).
- Status: Successor of the Byzantine Empire; Client state of the Kingdom of Georgia (1204–1227) (Note: "Some scholars believe that the new state was subject to Georgia, at least in the first years of its existence, at the beginning of the 13th century."); Vassal of the Mongol Empire (1243–1335)
- Capital: Trebizond
- Common languages: Pontic Greek (official); Laz; Western Armenian, Old Anatolian Turkish, Ligurian, Latin
- Religion: Greek Orthodoxy; Minority: Georgian Orthodox Church
- Demonyms: Trapezuntine, Rhomaios (Roman)
- Government: Monarchy
- Notable emperors^{1}
  - 1204–1222: Alexios I
  - 1238–1263: Manuel I
  - 1280–1297: John II
  - 1349–1390: Alexios III
  - 1459–1461: David
- Historical era: Late Middle Ages
  - Establishment: 1204
  - Fall of Constantinople to the Fourth Crusade: 12 April 1204
  - Submission to the Mongol Empire: 1243
  - Permanent loss of Sinope: 1265
  - John II renounces Imperial claims: 1282
  - Trapezuntine Civil Wars: 1340–1349
  - Fall of Trebizond: 15 August 1461
Preceded by
Byzantine Empire (Angelos dynasty)
Succeeded by
Ottoman Empire
Genoese Gazaria
Principality of Theodoro
- Today part of: Georgia; Russia; Turkey; Ukraine
- ^{1} the full title of the Trapezuntine emperors after 1282 was "the faithful Basileus and Autokrator of All the East, the Iberians and Perateia"

The Empire of Trebizond or the Trapezuntine Empire was one of the three Byzantine rump states of the Byzantine Empire that existed between the 13th and 15th centuries. The empire consisted of the Pontus, or far northeastern corner of Anatolia, and portions of southern Crimea. It was formed with the help of Georgia's interventions in Trebizond.

After the Fourth Crusade overthrew Alexios V Doukas and established the Latin Empire, the Empire of Trebizond became one of three Byzantine successor states to claim the imperial throne alongside the Empire of Nicaea under the House of Laskaris and the Despotate of Epirus under a branch of the House of Angelos. The Trapezuntine Empire was formed in 1204 with the help of Queen Tamar of Georgia after the Georgian expedition in Chaldia and Paphlagonia, which was commanded by Alexios Komnenos a few weeks before the Sack of Constantinople. Alexios later declared himself emperor and established himself in Trebizond (now Trabzon in Turkey). Alexios and David Komnenos, grandsons and last male descendants of the deposed emperor Andronikos I Komnenos, pressed their claims as Roman emperors against Alexios V Doukas. The ensuing wars saw the Empire of Thessalonica, the imperial government that sprang from Epirus, collapse following conflicts with Nicaea and the Second Bulgarian Empire and the final recapture of Constantinople by the Nicaeans in 1261.

Despite the Nicaean reconquest, the Emperors of Trebizond continued to style themselves as Roman emperor for two decades and to press their claim on the imperial throne. Emperor John II of Trebizond officially gave up the Trapezuntine claim to the Roman imperial title and Constantinople itself 21 years after the Nicaeans recaptured the city, altering his imperial title from "Emperor and Autocrat of the Romans" to "Emperor and Autocrat of all the East, Iberia and Perateia".

The restored empire ended in 1453 with the conquest of Constantinople by the Ottomans. Trebizond lasted until 1461, when the Ottoman sultan Mehmed II conquered it after a month-long siege and took its ruler and his family into captivity. The Crimean Principality of Theodoro, an offshoot of Trebizond, lasted another 14 years, falling to the Ottomans in 1475. The Trapezuntine monarchy survived the longest among the Byzantine successor states. The Despotate of Epirus had ceased to contest the Byzantine throne even before the Nicaean reconquest and was briefly occupied by the restored Byzantine Empire c. 1340, thereafter becoming a Serbian Imperial dependency later inherited by Italians, ultimately falling to the Ottoman Empire in 1479.

While the rulers of Trebizond bore the title of emperor until the end of their state in 1461, their rivals, the Laskarids in Nicaea and the Palaiologoi in Constantinople contested their claim to the imperial title until the later fourteenth century. In the thirteenth century, George Pachymeres would call them the princes of the Laz, while Demetrios Kydones in the mid fourteenth century would claim that the emperors at Constantinople had given the rulers of Trebizond their state. For the rulers in Constantinople, Trebizond was often viewed as a rebellious former vassal or barbarian who had broken loose and proclaimed themselves as emperors, but the emperors in Trebizond never renounced their imperial claim.

== Origins ==
Trebizond already had a long history of autonomous rule before it became the center of a small empire in the Late Middle Ages. Due to its natural harbours, defensible topography and access to silver and copper mines, Trebizond became the pre-eminent Greek colony on the eastern Black Sea shore soon after its founding. Its remoteness from Roman capitals gave local rulers the opportunity to advance their own interest. In the centuries before the founding of the empire the city had been under control of the local Gabras family, which – while officially still remaining part of the Byzantine Empire – minted its own coinage.

The rulers of Trebizond called themselves Megas Komnenos ("Great Comnenus") and – like their counterparts in the other two Byzantine successor states, the Empire of Nicaea and the Despotate of Epirus – initially claimed supremacy as "Emperor and Autocrat of the Romans". However, after Michael VIII Palaiologos of Nicaea recaptured Constantinople in 1261, the Komnenian use of the style "Emperor" became a sore point. In 1282, John II Komnenos, as a result of a treaty with Michael, stripped off his imperial regalia before the walls of Constantinople before entering to marry Michael's daughter, accepting his legal title of despot. However, his successors used a version of his title, "Emperor and Autocrat of the entire East, of the Iberians and the Perateia" until the Empire's end in 1461.

== Geography ==
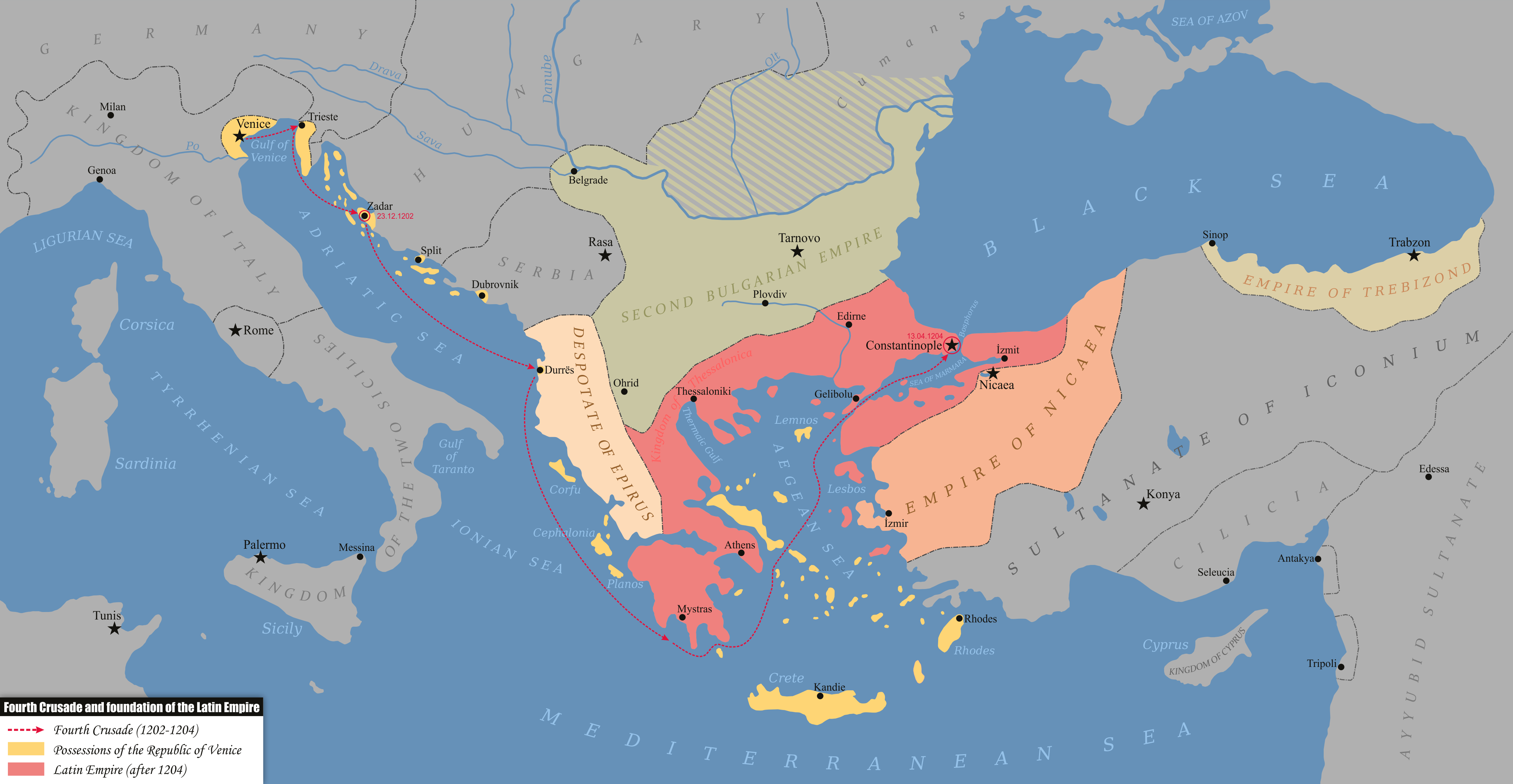
The path of the Fourth Crusade and the political situation of what once was the Byzantine Empire in 1204 AD.

Geographically, the Empire of Trebizond consisted of the narrow strip along the southern coast of the Black Sea and the western half of the Pontic Mountains along with the Gazarian Perateia, or southern Crimea (soon losing to the Genoese Gazaria and the Theodorite Gazaria).

The core of the empire was the southern Black Sea coast from the mouth of the Yeşilırmak, a region known to the Trapezuntines as Limnia, possibly as far east as Akampsis, a region then known as Lazia. Anthony Bryer has argued that six of the seven banda of the theme "district" of Chaldia were maintained in working order by the rulers of Trebizond until the end of the empire, helped by geography.

Geography also defined the southern border of this state: the Pontic Alps served as a barrier first to Seljuk Turks and later to Turkmens, whose predations were reduced to a volume that the emperors could cope with. This territory corresponds to an area comprising all or parts of the current Turkish provinces of Sinop, Samsun, Ordu, Giresun, Trabzon, Bayburt, Gümüşhane, Rize, and coastal parts of Artvin.

In the 13th century, some experts believe the empire controlled the Gazarian Perateia, which included Cherson and Kerch on the Crimean peninsula. David Komnenos, the younger brother of the first Emperor, expanded rapidly to the west, occupying first Sinope, then coastal parts of Paphlagonia (the modern-day coastal regions of Kastamonu, Bartın, and Zonguldak) and Heraclea Pontica (the modern-day Karadeniz Ereğli), until his territory bordered the Empire of Nicaea. The expansion was, however, short-lived: the territories west of Sinope were lost to Theodore I Laskaris by 1214, and Sinope itself fell to the Seljuks that same year, although the emperors of Trebizond continued to fight for its control over the rest of the 13th century.

Locally, the empire was divided into districts called bandon, fortified regions positioned along the rivers and designed to block enemy attacks from the littoral, where the principal centers of the state were located. In the 14th century, seven bandon were known: Trebizond, Trikomia, Matzouka, Paleomatzouka, Gemora, Surmena and Rizeon.

Other subdvisions included the Theme of Greater Lazia, the only theme in the Empire of Trebizond and the semi-independent Duchy of Chaldia.

== History ==
=== Background ===
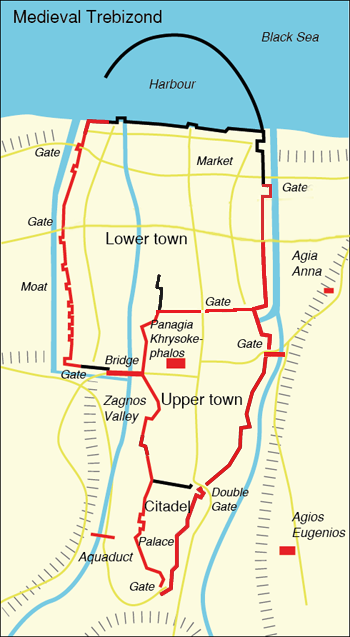
Fortification plan of Trebizond

The city of Trebizond was the capital of the theme of Chaldia, which according to the 10th century Arab geographer Abulfeda was regarded as being largely a Lazican port. Chaldia had already shown its separatist tendencies in the 10th and 11th centuries when it came under the control of a local leader named Theodore Gabras, who according to Anna Komnene regarded Trebizond and its hinterlands "as a prize which had fallen to his own lot" and conducted himself as an independent prince. The Byzantine Emperor Alexios I Komnenos confirmed him as governor of Chaldia but kept his son at Constantinople as a hostage for his good conduct.

Nevertheless, Gabras proved himself a worthy guardian by repelling a Georgian attack on Trebizond. One of his successors, Gregory Taronites, also rebelled with the aid of the sultan of Cappadocia, but he was defeated and imprisoned, only to be made governor once more. Another successor to Theodore was Constantine Gabras, whom Niketas describes as ruling Trebizond as a tyrant, and whose actions led Emperor John II Komnenos in 1139 to lead an expedition against him. Although that effort came to nothing, this was the last rebel governor known to recorded history before the events of 1204.

=== Foundation ===
The empire traces its foundation to April 1204, when Alexios Komnenos and his brother David took advantage of the preoccupation of the central Byzantine government with the encampment of the soldiers of the Fourth Crusade outside their walls (June 1203 – mid-April 1204) and seized the city of Trebizond and the surrounding province of Chaldia with troops provided by their relative, Tamar of Georgia. Henceforth, the links between Trebizond and Georgia remained close, but their nature and extent have been disputed. However some scholars believe that the new state was subject to Georgia, at least in the first years of its existence, at the beginning of the 13th century.

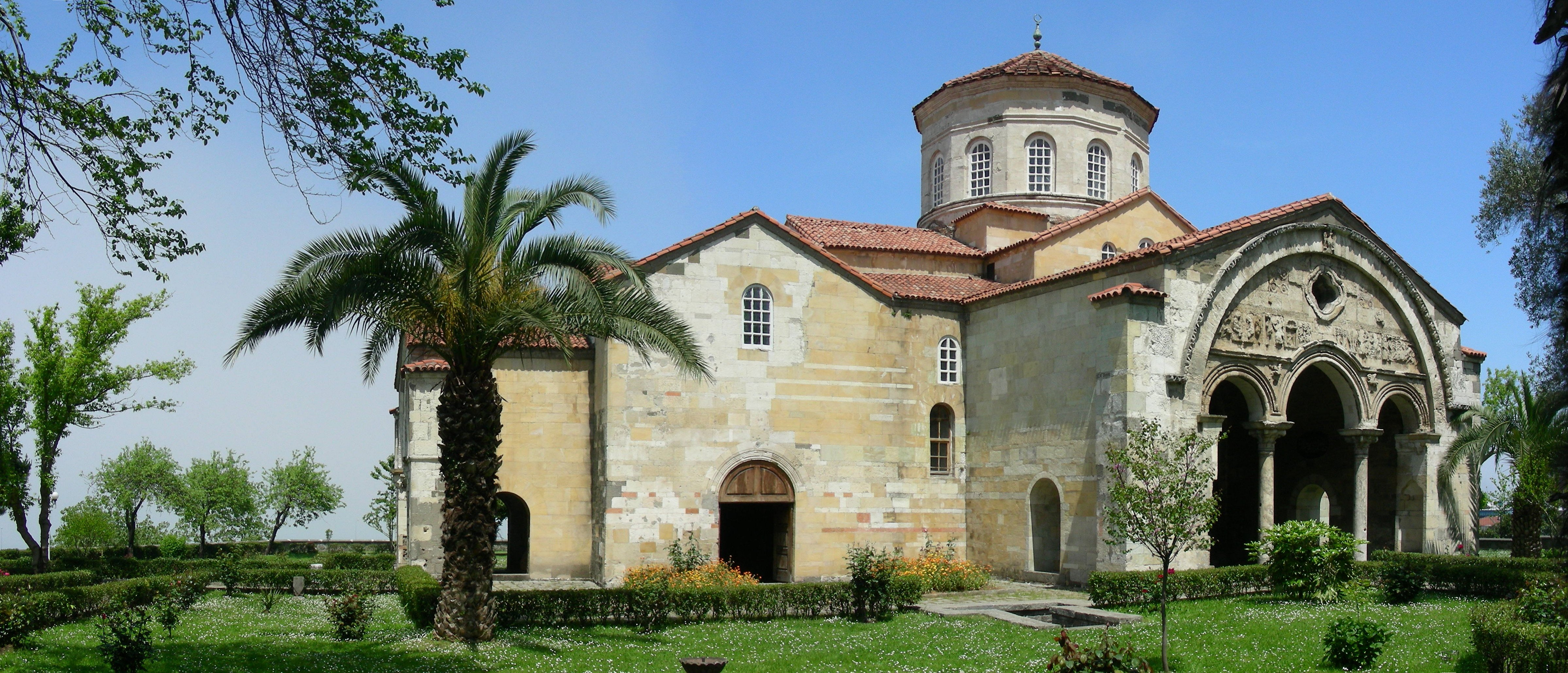
The Hagia Sophia church of Trebizond, which was converted from a museum to mosque in 2013.

Both men were the grandsons of the last Komnenian Byzantine emperor, Andronikos I Komnenos, by his son Manuel Komnenos and Rusudan, daughter of George III of Georgia. Andronikos I had been deposed by Isaac II Angelos, while Manuel was blinded (a traditional Byzantine punishment for treason) and died not long after. Alexios and his brother, David, ended up at the court of Queen Tamar of Georgia, who gave them military support to return to Byzantine territory. Vasiliev explains that she had been motivated to do so after the Emperor Alexios III Angelos stole the gifts Tamar had given to a group of visiting monks as they passed through Constantinople. While Michel Kurskanskis has argued in support of Vasiliev's interpretation, he disagrees with Vasiliev over the intent of Tamar's intervention: Vasiliev has argued that the Queen intended to create a buffer state to protect the Georgian Kingdom, while Kurskanskis believes she supported the brothers in their attempt to reclaim the Byzantine throne in Constantinople.

After marching from Georgia, and with the help of their paternal aunt Queen Tamar, Alexios and David occupied Trebizond in April 1204. That same month Alexios was proclaimed emperor at the age of 22, an act considered by later writers as the moment the Empire of Trebizond was founded. Alexios ruled his new empire for the next eighteen years, until his death in February 1222. The throne then passed to his son-in-law Andronikos I Gidos Komnenos.

=== Up to the civil wars ===
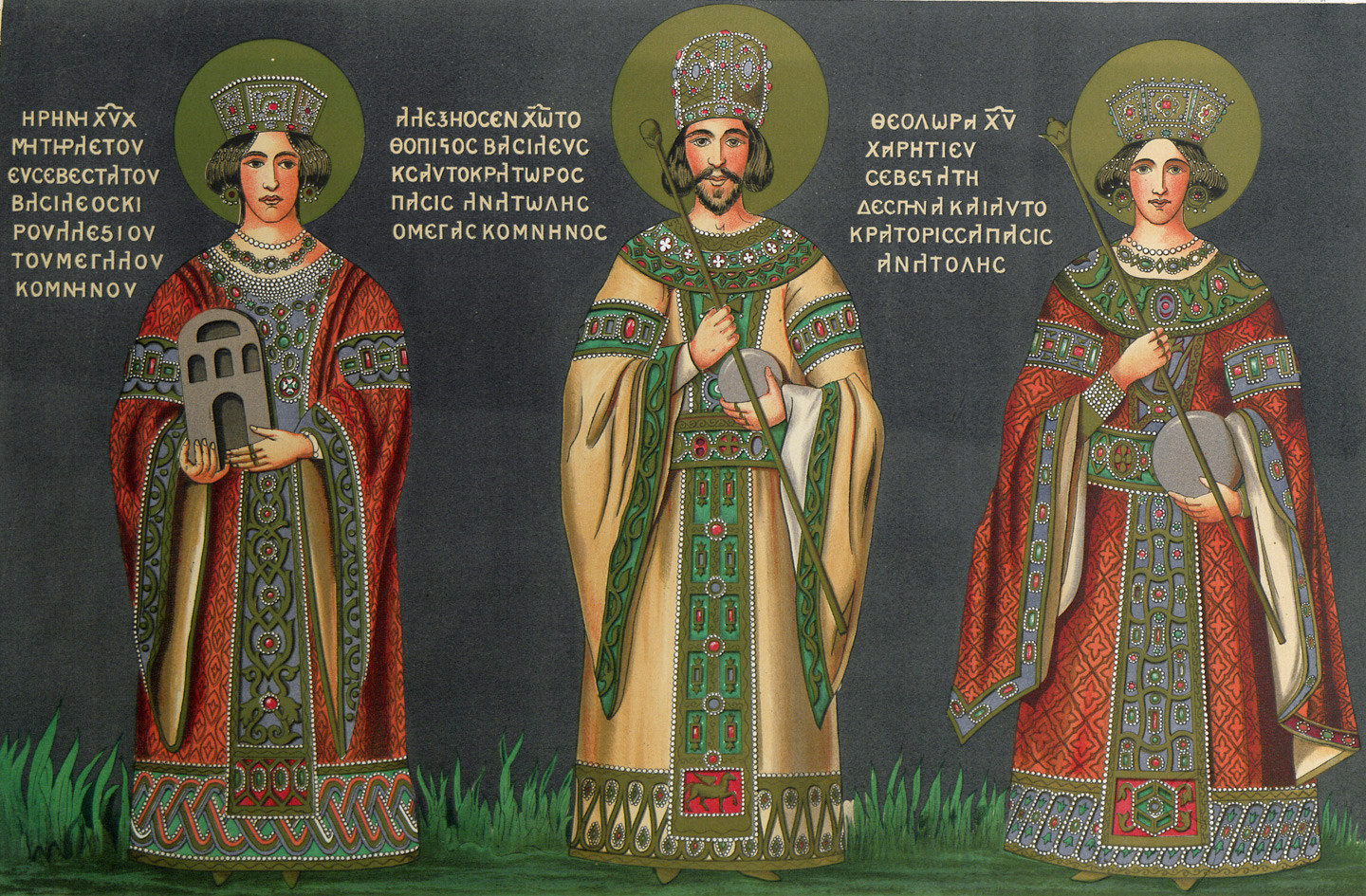
Copy of a destroyed fresco depicting Alexios III, his mother Eirene and his wife Theodora, Panagia Theoskepastos Monastery

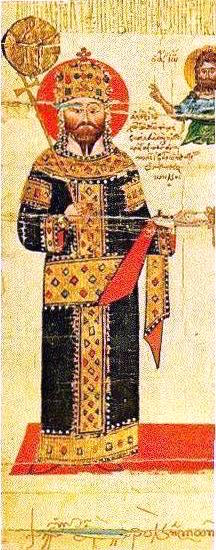
Alexios III, from the chrysobull he granted to the Dionysiou monastery on Mount Athos.

The date Alexios entered Trebizond may be narrowed down even further. Sergey Karpov has identified a lead seal of Alexios, on one side "the image of a strategos in the peaked helmet led by hand by St. George" with the inscriptions Ἀλέξιος ὁ Κομνηνός [Alexios Komnenos] and Ὁ Ἅ(γιος) Γεώργιος [Saint George] on either side; on the obverse is a scene of Ἡ Ἁγία Ἀνάστασις [The Holy Resurrection] with the corresponding inscription. Karpov interprets the significance of this image and the inscription as portraying the most important achievement of his life, St. George inviting the victorious prince to enter Trebizond and opening the gates of the city with his left hand. The importance of St. George was that Easter—the date of the Resurrection—in 1204 fell on 25 April, while the memorial date of St. George was 23 April. "So I dared to assume," writes Karpov, "that the seal points out the date of the capture of Trebizond."

Vasiliev points out that the brothers occupied Trebizond too early to have done so in response to the Crusaders capturing Constantinople; Alexios and David began their march on Trebizond before news of the Sack of Constantinople on 13 April 1204 could reach either Trebizond or Georgia. According to Vasiliev, however, their original intention was not to seize a base from which they could recover the capital of the Byzantine Empire, but rather to carve out of the Byzantine Empire a buffer state to protect Georgia from the Seljuk Turks. Kuršanskis, while agreeing with Vasiliev that Tamar was motivated by revenge for Alexios Angelos's insult, proposed a more obvious motivation for the brother's return to Byzantine territory: they had decided to raise the banner of revolt, depose Alexios Angelos, and return the imperial throne to the Komnenos dynasty. However, not long after they had gained control of Trebizond and the neighboring territories, news of the Latin conquest of Constantinople reached them, and the brothers entered the competition for recovery of the imperial city against Theodore I Laskaris in western Anatolia (ruler of the "Empire of Nicaea") and Michael Komnenos Doukas in mainland Greece (ruler of the "Despotate of Epirus").

For most of the 13th century Trebizond was in continual conflict with the Seljuk Sultanate of Rûm and later with the Ottoman Turks, as well as Constantinople and the Republic of Genoa. It was an empire more in title than in fact, surviving by playing its rivals against each other, and offering the daughters of its rulers, who were famed for their beauty, for marriage with generous dowries, especially with the Turkish rulers of inland Anatolia. The common view is that the Empire of Trebizond relied heavily upon wealth gained from its trade with Genoese and Venetian merchants to secure for itself the resources necessary to maintain independence.

The second son of Alexios I, Manuel I (1238–1263), preserved internal security and acquired the reputation of a great commander. His accomplishments included capturing Sinope in 1254, taking advantage of the turbulent situation in the Sultanate of Rum at the time. He was the first ruler to issue silver coins, which were known as aspers.

The destruction of Baghdad by Hulagu Khan in 1258 diverted the western terminus of the Silk Road north to the Black Sea, and due to its link with their local capital at Tabriz, Trebizond accumulated tremendous wealth under the suzerainty of the Mongols. Western travelers used Trebizond as their starting point for journeys into Asia; these travelers included Marco Polo, who returned to Europe in 1295 by way of Trebizond. The troubled reign of Manuel's youngest son John II (1280–1297) included a reconciliation with the restored Byzantine Empire and the end of Trapezuntine claims to Constantinople. Trebizond enjoyed a period of wealth and influence during the long reign of John's eldest son Alexios II (1297–1330). During his reign, the city of Erzurum was also under Trebizond Empire occupation for a while around the 1310s.

=== From the civil wars to the end of the 14th century ===
Following the death of Alexios II, Trebizond suffered a period of repeated imperial depositions and assassinations, despite a short period of stability under his youngest son Basil (1332–1340). Two groups struggled for ascendency: the Scholaroi, who have been identified as being pro-Byzantine, and the Amytzantarantes, who were identified as representing the interests of the native archontes. The years 1347–1348 marked the apex of this lawless period. The Turks took advantage of the weakness of the empire, conquering Oinaion and besieging Trebizond, while the Genoese seized Kerasus. In addition, the Black Death spread from Caffa to ravage Trebizond and other Pontic cities. Bending under the weight of the disasters that accumulated on his states, Emperor Michael abdicated in 1349 in favor of his nephew, Alexios III, who gradually brought the partisans of both factions under control.

Under the rule of Alexios III, Trebizond was considered an important trade center and was renowned for its great wealth and artistic accomplishment. It was at this point that their famous diplomatic strategy of marrying the princesses of the Grand Komnenos to neighboring Turkish dynasts began. However, Anthony Bryers has argued against thinking this empire was a wealthy polity, stating that while the income from taxes levied on this trade was "by Byzantine standards" substantial, as much as three quarters of the income of the Emperor came from land "either directly from the imperial estates or indirectly from taxes and tithes from other lands."

=== 15th century ===
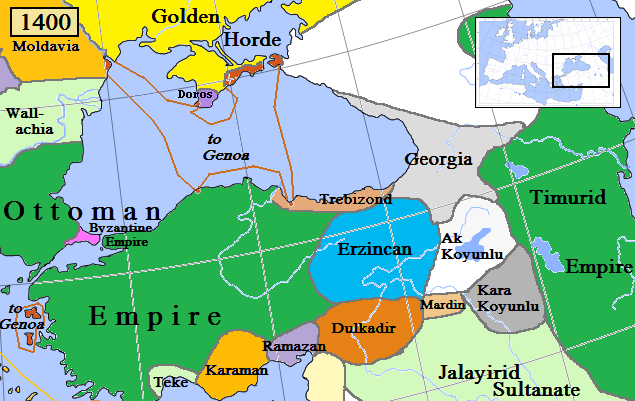
A reduced Trebizond with surrounding states by 1400

The last years of the fourteenth century were characterized by the increasing Turkish threat. This threat was not from the small Turkmen emirates that bordered Trebizond, but from the dynasty of the Osmanli, a new Turkish power emerging from western Anatolia that would soon consolidate the Ottoman Empire. Although their expansion was temporarily checked by Tamerlane at the Battle of Ankara in 1402, by the 1430s the Ottomans had recovered their fortunes, seizing large segments of Greece and finally capturing Constantinople itself on 29 May 1453. Manuel III (1390–1417), the second son and successor of Alexios III, had allied himself with Tamerlane, but the mighty conqueror soon left Anatolia, and the empire he had built crumbled with his death. Manuel's son Alexios IV (1417–1429) continued the tradition of political marriages by marrying two of his daughters to rulers of two neighboring Muslim empires: Jihan Shah, khan of the Kara Koyunlu, and Ali Beg, khan of the Ak Koyunlu. His eldest daughter Maria became the third wife of the Byzantine Emperor John VIII Palaiologos.

Alexios IV's eldest son, John IV (1429–1459), could not help but see that his Empire would soon share the fate of Constantinople. The Ottoman sultan Murad II first attempted to take the capital by the sea in 1442, but high surf made the landings difficult and the attempt was repulsed. While Murad's son and successor, Mehmed II, was away laying siege to Belgrade in 1456, the Ottoman governor of Amasya attacked Trebizond, and although defeated, he took many prisoners and extracted a heavy tribute. A Genoese document records the seizure of one of their ships at that port in 1437 by a military Galley on the orders of Emperor John IV.

John IV prepared for the eventual assault by forging alliances. He sent an envoy to the Council of Florence in 1439, the humanist George Amiroutzes, which resulted in the proclamation of the Union of the Catholic and Orthodox Churches, but this proclamation brought little help. He gave his daughter Theodora (also known by the name of Despina Khatun) to the son of his brother-in-law, Uzun Hasan, khan of the Ak Koyunlu, in return for his promise to defend Trebizond. He also secured promises of help from the Turkish emirs of Sinope and Karamania, and from the king and princes of Georgia. Through Theodora and the daughter of Alexios IV of Trebizond (also named Theodora), the Safavid dynasty of Iran that succeeded the Ak Koyunlu, would be of direct partial Pontic Greek ethnicity from its very beginning, Ismail I being the grandson of Theodora.

After John's death in 1459, his brother David came to power. David intrigued with various European powers for help against the Ottomans, speaking of wild schemes that included the conquest of Jerusalem. Mehmed II eventually heard of these intrigues and was further provoked to action by David's demand that Mehmed remit the tribute imposed on his brother.

Mehmed's response came in the summer of 1461. He collected a sizable army at Bursa, and in a surprise move marched on Sinope, whose emir quickly surrendered. Then the sultan moved south across eastern Anatolia to neutralize Uzun Hasan. Having isolated Trebizond, Mehmed swept down upon it before the inhabitants knew he was coming, and placed it under siege. The city held out for a month before David surrendered on 15 August 1461. With the fall of Trebizond, the last independent remnant of the Byzantine Empire, as well as the Roman Empire from which the Byzantine Empire sprang, was the Empire of Trebizond's offshoot, the Principality of Theodoro. On December 30, 1475, it would also fall to Ottoman rule.

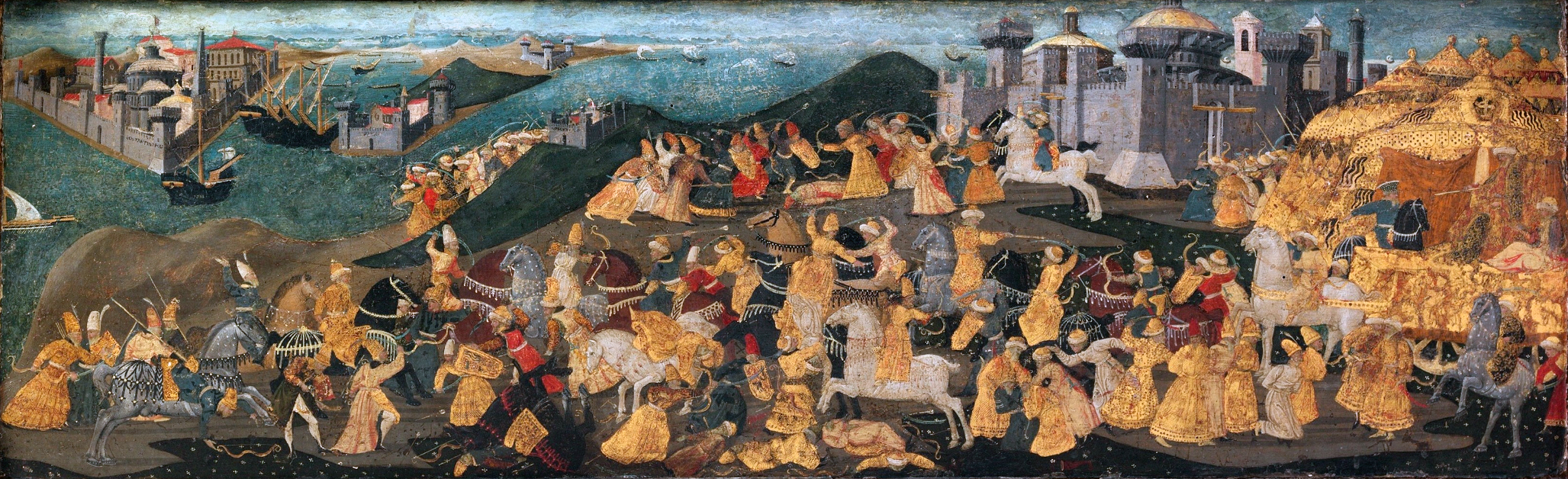
A contemporary depiction of the fall of Trebizond by Apollonio di Giovanni di Tomaso

== Culture ==
=== Religion ===
Christianity strongly influenced society in the Empire of Trebizond. According to the Acts of Vazelon, which were written by contemporary monks, most peasants in the Matzouka region of the Empire had first names relating to Christian religious figures. Last names often referred to Christian saints, trades, and place names.

In the relatively limited territory of the kingdom of the Grand Komnenoi (known as the "Empire of Trebizond") there was enough room for three dioceses: Trebizond, which was the only diocese established far in the past, Cerasous and Rizaion in Lazika, both formed as upgraded bishoprics. All three dioceses survived the Ottoman conquest (1461) and generally operated until the 17th century, when the dioceses of Cerasous and Rizaion were abolished. The diocese of Rizaion and the bishopric of Of were abolished at the time due to the Islamisation of the Laz and of the region respectively. Possibly the diocese of Cerasous was deactivated for the same reasons.

== Economy ==
The economy of the Empire of Trebizond (1204–1461) was defined by its strategic position at the southeastern terminus of the historic Silk Road and its control of the southern coast of the Black Sea. Inheriting the commercial infrastructure of the Byzantine province of Chaldia, the empire flourished as a major entrepôt, funneling the wealth of Persia, Armenia, and the broader Asian interior towards Genoese, Venetian, and other Western European markets. While its political power was often confined to a narrow coastal strip, Trebizond’s prosperity was sustained by three pillars: its pivotal role in long-distance transit trade, the export of its own rich natural resources—notably Pontic silver, alum, and agricultural goods like wine and hazelnuts—and its vibrant, autonomous merchant quarters. This commercial wealth, mediated through a sophisticated monetary system and treaties with Italian maritime republics, underpinned the Trapezuntine state and its cultural achievements, allowing it to outlast both the Byzantine Empire and the Seljuk Sultanate of Rum before its eventual conquest by the Ottoman Empire in 1461.

== In popular culture ==
In the 19th-century Johannes Rietstap popularized Argent, three bars Sable as the arms of Trebizond and the Komnenoi, based on older medieval sources, however, no contemporary sources support these arms, and medieval armorials are known to conjure fanciful arms for remote regions

The Empire of Trebizond acquired a reputation in Western Europe for being "enriched by the trade from Persia and the East that passed through its capital," according to Steven Runciman, "and by the silver-mines in the hills behind, and famed for the beauty of its princesses." Donald Nicol echoes Runciman's observations: "Most of the emperors were blessed with a progeny of marriageable daughters, and the beauty of the ladies of Trebizond was as legendary as the wealth of their dowries." Its wealth and exotic location endowed a lingering fame on the polity. Cervantes described the eponymous hero of his Don Quixote as "imagining himself for the valour of his arm already crowned at least Emperor of Trebizond". Rabelais had his character Picrochole, the ruler of Piedmont, declare: "I want also to be Emperor of Trebizond." Other allusions and works set in Trebizond continue into the 20th century.

In Italian, there exists the expression "to lose the Trebizond" (perdere la Trebisonda) which means "to be bewildered". Trebizond was a port reachable by all the routes that crossed the Black Sea, and therefore a safe shelter in case of storms.

== See also ==
- List of Trapezuntine emperors
- List of Trapezuntine usurpers
- Komnenos dynasty and related family tree
- Hagia Sophia, Trabzon
- Sumela Monastery
- Dorothy Dunnett, a Scottish historical novelist, much of whose book The Spring of the Ram is set in Trebizond at the time of its fall
- Lawrence Schoonover, an American historical novelist, much of whose book The Burnished Blade is set in Trebizond at its height
- The Towers of Trebizond, a novel by Rose Macaulay (1881–1958)

== Sources and research ==
=== Primary sources ===
- Basilios Bessarion, The praise of Trebizond
- Michael Panaretos, Chronicle

=== Secondary sources ===
- Anthony Bryer & David Winfield, The Byzantine Monuments and Topography of the Pontos (DOS. XX), vol. 1–2, Washington, 1985.
- Anthony Bryer, Peoples and Settlement in Anatolia and the Caucasus, 800–1900, Variorum collected studies series, London, 1988.
- Bryer, Anthony (1980). The Empire of Trebizond and the Pontos. London: Variorum Reprints. ISBN 978-0-86078-062-5.
- Jakob Philipp Fallmerayer, Geschichte des Kaiserthums Trapezunt (Munich, 1827–1848)
- George Finlay, The History of Greece, from Its Conquest by the Crusaders to Its Conquest by the Turks, and of the Empire of Trebizond: 1204–1461. Edinburgh: Blackwood, 1851.
- Émile Janssens. Trébizonde en Colchide. Bruxelles: Presses universitaires de Bruxelles, 1969,
- Sergei Karpov, L' impero di Trebisonda, Venezia, Genova e Roma, 1204–1461. Rapporti politici, diplomatici e commerciali. Roma, 1986.
- Sergei Karpov, Трапезундская империя и западноевропейские государства, 1204–1461. ("The Empire of Trebizond and the nations of Western Europe, 1204–1461".) Moscow, 1981.
- Sergei Karpov, История Трапезундской империи ("A history of the empire of Trebizond"). Saint Petersburg, 2007.
- William Miller, Trebizond: The Last Greek Empire, (1926; repr. Chicago: Argonaut Publishers, 1968)
- Donald M. Nicol (October 14, 1993). The Last Centuries of Byzantium, 1261-1453. Cambridge University Press. ISBN 978-0-521-43991-6.
- Donald Queller, Thomas F. Madden, The Fourth Crusade: The Conquest of Constantinople, University of Pennsylvania Press, Philadelphia, 2nd ed., 1997. ISBN 0-8122-3387-5
- Savvides, Alexios G. K. (2009). Ιστορία της Αυτοκρατορίας των Μεγάλων Κομνηνών της Τραπεζούντας (1204–1461). 2η Έκδοση με προσθήκες [History of the Empire of the Grand Komnenoi of Trebizond (1204–1461). 2nd Edition with additions] (in Greek). Thessaloniki: Kyriakidis Brothers S.A. ISBN 978-960-467-121-2.
- Jonathan Shepard, ed. (2008). The Cambridge History of the Byzantine Empire C.500-1492. Cambridge University Press. ISBN 978-0-521-83231-1.
- Shukurov, Rustam (2001). Великие Комнины и Восток (1204—1461) ("The Megas Komnenos and the Orient (1204–1461)") (in Russian). Saint Petersburg. ISBN 5-89329-337-1.
- Levan Urushadze, The Comnenus of Trabizond and the Bagrationi dynasty of Georgia. — J. "Tsiskari", Tbilisi, No 4, 1991, pp. 144–148: in Georgian.
- Fyodor Uspensky, From the history of the Empire of Trabizond (Ocherki iz istorii Trapezuntskoy Imperii), Leningrad, 1929 (in Russian).
- Zehiroğlu, Ahmet M. (2016). Trabzon İmparatorluğu 2 [The Empire of Trebizond (Vol.2) (1222–1382)] (in Turkish). Lazika Yayın Kollektifi. ISBN 978-6054567522.
- Zehiroğlu, Ahmet M. (2018). Trabzon İmparatorluğu 3 [The Empire of Trebizond (Vol.3) (1382-1451)] (in Turkish). ISBN 978-6058103207.

=== Further reading ===
- Eastmond, Antony (2004). Art and Identity in Thirteenth-Century Byzantium: Hagia Sophia and the Empire of Trebizond. Routledge. ISBN 0754635759.
- Eastmond, Antony, ed. (2016). Byzantium's Other Empire: Trebizond. Ege Yayinlari. ISBN 978-6059388009.
