= Perateia =

Overseas territory of Trebizond

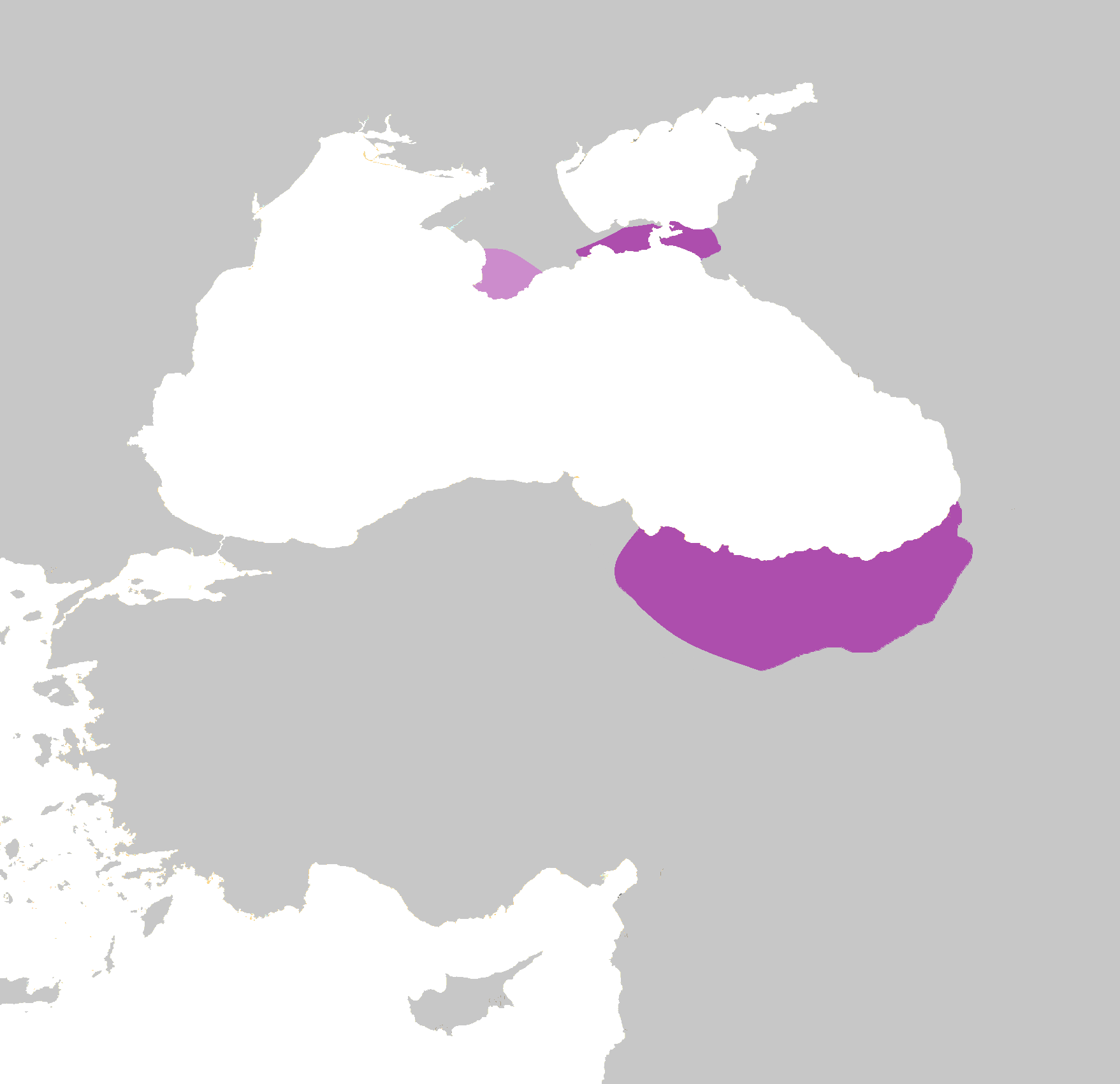
The upper territories make up Perateia

Perateia (Greek: Περατεία, "place beyond [the sea]", cf. peraia) was the overseas territory of the Empire of Trebizond, comprising the Crimean cities of Cherson, Kerch and their hinterlands. The territory was probably administered during Byzantine rule from Trebizond before the Comneni established a separate empire a few weeks before the Crusader sack of Constantinople in 1204.

Trapezuntine control over Perateia had been weak almost from the beginning, subjected to pressure from the Genoese and Tatars by the time of Alexius I's death in 1222. The year after, the Seljuk Turks raided Perateia's coasts, and built the fortress of Sudak to try and channel the Crimean trade from Trebizond into Seljuk-held Sinope. After that, the area was administered by the Gabras family, Trapezuntine magnates who later established the Principality of Theodoro.
