= Michael Gabras =

Michael Gabras (Greek: Μιχαήλ Γαβρᾶς; c. 1290 – after 1350) was a Byzantine official and writer. A lowly scribe in the imperial chancery, Gabras' life is relatively obscure except through his voluminous correspondence. Byzantinist Anthony Bryer called him "the most prolific of all Byzantine letter writers."

Gabras' 462 letters span the period 1305–1341, and his 111 correspondents include most of the major political and literary figures of his day. He also had a brother, John, who wrote a theological treatise against the doctrines of Gregory Palamas.

== Sources ==
- Bryer, Anthony M. (1970). "A Byzantine Family: The Gabrades, c. 979 – c. 1653". University of Birmingham Historical Journal. 12. Birmingham: 164–187.
- Talbot, Alice-Mary (1991). "Gabras, Michael". In Kazhdan, Alexander (ed.). The Oxford Dictionary of Byzantium. Oxford and New York: Oxford University Press. p. 812. ISBN 0-19-504652-8.
- Trapp, Erich; Beyer, Hans-Veit; Walther, Rainer; Sturm-Schnabl, Katja; Kislinger, Ewald; Leontiadis, Ioannis; Kaplaneres, Sokrates (1976–1996). Prosopographisches Lexikon der Palaiologenzeit (in German). Vienna: Verlag der Österreichischen Akademie der Wissenschaften. ISBN 3-7001-3003-1.
