= Choniates =

Choniates may refer to:

- Niketas Choniates (c. 1155 – c. 1215 or 1216), Byzantine chronicler
- Michael Choniates (c. 1140 – c. 1220), Byzantine writer and ecclesiastic
