= Chaldia =

Historical region of Anatolia

Coordinates: 40.5°N 39.5°E

Theme of Chaldia Χαλδία, θέμα Χαλδίας
- Theme of the Byzantine Empire
- c. 820/840–1091/1095; 1098–1126; 1140–1204
- Map of the administrative structure of the Byzantine Empire in 842. Chaldia's strategic location in the north-easternmost corner of the Empire is evident.
- Capital: Trapezus
- Historical era: Middle Ages
  - Establishment as a theme: c. 820/840
  - Autonomy from Byzantine rule after Seljuk incursions: 1091/1095–1098
  - Rebellion of Constantine Gabras: 1126–1140
  - Autonomy from Byzantine rule after Fourth Crusade: 1204
  - Fall to the Ottomans: 1461

Chaldia (Greek: Χαλδία, Khaldia) was a historical region located in the mountainous interior of the eastern Black Sea, northeast Anatolia (modern Turkey) in Western Asia. Its name was derived from a people called the Chaldoi (or Chalybes) that inhabited the region in antiquity. Chaldia was used throughout the Byzantine period and was established as a formal theme, known as the Theme of Chaldia (Greek: θέμα Χαλδίας), by 840. During the Late Middle Ages, it formed the core of the Empire of Trebizond until its fall to the Ottoman Empire in 1461.

Anthony Bryer traces the origin of its name not to Chaldea, as Constantine VII had done, but to the Urartian language, for whose speakers Ḫaldi was the Sun God. Bryer notes at the time of his writing that a number of villages in the Of district were still known as "Halt". Other scholars, however, reject the Urartian connection. Χάλυψ, the tribe's name in Greek, means "tempered iron, steel", a term that passed into Latin as chalybs, "steel". Sayce derived the Greek name Chalybe from Hittite Khaly-wa, "land of Halys". More than an identifiable people or tribe, "Chalybes" was a generic Greek term for "peoples of the Black Sea coast who trade in iron".

== Geography ==
Initially, the name Chaldia was consigned to the highland region around Gümüşhane, in northeast Anatolia, but in the middle Byzantine period, the name was extended to include the coastal areas, and thus the entire province around Trapezus (Trebizond, modern Trabzon). Forming the easternmost area of the Pontic Alps, Chaldia was bounded to the north by the Black Sea, to the east by Lazica, the westernmost part of Caucasian Iberia, to the south by Erzincan, Erzurum and what the Romans and Byzantines called Armenia Minor, and to the west by the western half of Pontus. Its main cities were the two ancient Greek colonies, Kerasus (modern Giresun) and Trapezus, situated in the coastal lowlands. The mountainous interior to the south, known as Mesochaldia ("Middle Chaldia"), was more sparsely inhabited and described by the 6th-century historian Procopius as "inaccessible", but rich in mineral deposits, especially lead, but also silver and gold. The mines of the region gave the name Argyropolis ("silver town", modern Gümüşhane) to the principal settlement.

== History ==
The one surviving word from the Chaldian language, Kakamar (the Chaldian name for the Black Sea), points toward an Indo-European connection. Strabo identifies the Chaldians with the ancient people of Chalybia and describes them as rough and warlike. The first local inhabitants, the Chalybes, were counted among the earliest ironsmith nations by Classical writers. Indeed, the Greek name for steel is chalybas (Greek: χάλυβας), possibly deriving from them. According to Apollonius of Rhodes, the Chalybes were Scythians. The first Greek colony was that of Trapezus, founded by Greek traders from Miletus, traditionally dated to 756 BC. Greek colonization was restricted to the coast, and in later ages Roman control remained likewise only nominal over the tribes of the interior.

The coastal regions, however, belonged to the Roman province of Pontus Polemoniacus. Only during the reign of the Byzantine emperor Justinian I (r. 527–565) were the warlike tribes, the Sannoi or Tzannoi, subdued, Christianized, and brought under central rule. Justinian included the entire region in the newly constituted province of Armenia I Magna with Trapezus as its capital (under Emperor Maurice, it was renamed Armenia III).

In the second half of the 7th century, with the establishment of the theme system, the region (Pontus Polemoniacus with the portion of Armenia I known as Keltzene) became part of the Armeniac Theme, initially as the tourma (division) of Chaldia, and later as a semi-distinct duchy (doukaton) or archontate. By 840, and perhaps as early as 824, it was constituted as a theme in its own right. Arab geographers of the 9th and 10th centuries report differently on the theme: Ibn Khordadbeh reports that it counted six fortified places, Qudama ibn Ja'far that its troops numbered 4,000, while Ibn al-Faqih writes that its governing strategos commanded 10,000 men (certainly exaggerated) and had two subordinate tourmarchai. According to 10th-century documents, the strategos of Chaldia received twenty pounds of gold as an annual salary, of which half was paid by the state treasury and the rest came from the tax proceeds of his province, including the kommerkion tax on the important trade routes from the East that converged on Trapezus. In the early 10th century, the theme's southern portion, the district of Keltzene, was detached and added to the newly established theme of Mesopotamia.

Until the eastern gains in the latter 10th century, Chaldia remained the northeastern frontier of the Byzantine Empire. During the periods 1091/1095–1098 and 1126–1140, the theme was practically autonomous from the Byzantine government. During the first period, under its doux, Theodore Gabras, the region had been cut off from the remaining Byzantine territories by the Seljuk Turks, while during the second period, doux Constantine Gabras had rebelled against Emperor John II Komnenos. After the sack of Constantinople in 1204 by Latin crusaders, two Byzantine successor states were established: the Empire of Nicaea, and the Despotate of Epirus. A third, the Empire of Trebizond, was created after Alexios Komnenos, commanding the Georgian expedition in Chaldia a few weeks before the sack of Constantinople, found himself de facto emperor, and established himself in Trebizond. Indeed, by the 14th century, the Empire was reduced practically to the territory of the old theme. The Empire of Trebizond managed to survive through successive upheavals by a combination of its inaccessible location, a small but capable army, and a sound diplomacy based on marriage alliances, before finally falling to the Ottomans in 1461. Even thereafter, isolated fortresses in the interior continued to resist. Only in 1479 was the region subdued, when the castle of Golacha, the last remaining Christian stronghold in Asia Minor, fell. Significant numbers of Pontic Greeks remained in the region throughout the Ottoman period, until the 1923 population exchange between Greece and Turkey.

== Sources ==
- Evans, James Allan Stewart (2000). The Age of Justinian: The Circumstances of Imperial Power. London and New York: Routledge. ISBN 978-0-415-23726-0.
- McGeer, Eric; Nesbitt, John; Oikonomides, Nicolas, eds. (2001). Catalogue of Byzantine Seals at Dumbarton Oaks and in the Fogg Museum of Art, Volume 4: The East. Vol. 4. Washington, DC: Dumbarton Oaks Research Library and Collection. ISBN 0-88402-282-X.
- Pertusi, A. (1952). Constantino Porfirogenito: De Thematibus (in Italian). Rome: Biblioteca Apostolica Vaticana.
- Smith, William (1854). Dictionary of Greek and Roman Geography. Boston, Massachusetts: Little, Brown and Company.
- Talbert, Richard J. A. (2000). Barrington Atlas of the Greek and Roman World: Map-by-Map Directory. Princeton, New Jersey: Princeton University Press. ISBN 978-0-691-04945-8.
- Treadgold, Warren T. (1995). Byzantium and Its Army, 284–1081. Stanford, California: Stanford University Press. ISBN 0-8047-3163-2.
- Treadgold, Warren (1997). A History of the Byzantine State and Society. Stanford, California: Stanford University Press. ISBN 0-8047-2630-2.
