= List of Trapezuntine usurpers =

Empire of Trebizond Usurpers

The following is a list of usurpers in the Empire of Trebizond or the Trapezuntine Empire, from the start of the reign of Alexios I in 1204 to the fall of Trebizond in 1461.

== Usurper Emperors ==
The following is a listing of Emperors/Empress of Trebizond who rose to the throne due to their own initiative through a revolt or coup d'état.

- John II
- Theodora
- Basil
- Irene Palaiologina
- Anna Anachoutlou
- John III
- Michael
- Alexios III
- John IV
- David

== Unsuccessful usurpers in the Empire of Trebizond ==
=== John II: 1280-1297 ===
- George Megas Komnenos (1284) – A former emperor attempted to take the throne from his brother, but failed and was beaten and sent into exile.

=== Irene Palaiologina: 1340-1341 ===
- Sebastos Tzanichites (1340) – A leader of the local nobility who rebelled against Irene in 1340 after the death of Basil, seeking to restore the Komnenian line's influence, but was crushed and defeated by John the Eunuch.

=== Anna Anachoutlou: 1341-1342 ===
- Michael Megas Komnenos (1341) – Attempted to take the throne from Anna with the help from Niketas Scholares after Irene was overthrown, but he was defeated and put into prison.

=== Alexios III: 1349-1390 ===
- Constantine Doranites (1351) – Rebelled against Alexios III without any success.
- Theodore Doranites (1351) – Attempted to rebel and avenge his brother but was arrested and executed in July 1352.
- Leo Kabasites (1351) – In January 1351, early in Alexios III's reign, Leo Kabasites organized an initial conspiracy against the young emperor. Alexios III arrested Kabasites and temporarily replaced him with Theodore Doranites (Pileles), whom he had briefly freed. Members of the Kabasites family would later try to assassinate Alexios III again in the 1363 ambush at the St. Gregory River
- Niketas Scholares (1353-1354) – Rebelled against Alexios III after no longer needing him as guidance, he held the city of Kenchrina until October 1354 when he surrenders and was forced to retire from politics.
- Michael Megas Komnenos (1355) – Michael returned from exile and attempted to reclaim the throne, but he could gather no support and withdrew into exile.
- John III Megas Komnenos (c.1357-1362) – Attempted to take the throne after escaping from Adrianople, he first landed in Sinope only to die in that city in 1362.
- Kabasites family (1363) – Attempted to assassinate Alexios III with the help of some nobles but Alexios escaped the ambush and arrested the family members and loyal nobles.
- Niphon of Trebizond (1363) – Was removed as metropolitan by Alexios III after alleged plot against him.
- Michael Palaiologos (1373) – The son of John V Palaiologos, in November 1373, he set sailed to Trebizond, where he tried to force the deposition of the Emperor of Trebizond, Alexios III. His fleet of three ships laid at anchor outside the city's harbor for five days, when he sailed back in failure. He was murdered later in 1376/7 by his brother-in-law, Terter.

=== Manuel III: 1390-1417 ===
- Alexios IV Megas Komnenos (c. 1416–1417) – Manuel III’s own son and co-ruler. Exploiting aristocratic anger over a young page favored by Manuel, Alexios raised a flag of revolt, rallied the native Trapezuntine nobility, and besieged his father inside the upper citadel of Trebizond. He forced Manuel to banish the favorite. Though father and son reached a tense reconciliation, Manuel died shortly after in March 1417, with historical rumors suggesting Alexios may have poisoned or hastened his father's death to secure the throne.

=== John IV: 1429-1460 ===
- Alexander Megas Komnenos (1438) – Brother of John IV and son of Alexios IV, Alexander plotted to usurp the throne in c.1438 against his brother but nothing happened.

== See also ==
- List of Roman usurpers
- List of Byzantine usurpers
- List of Trapezuntine emperors
