= Anna Anachoutlou =

Empress of Trebizond 1341–1342)

- Empress and Autocratess of all the East and Perateia

Trapezuntine empress regnant
- Reign: 17 July 1341 – August/September 1342
- Predecessor: Irene Palaiologina
- Successor: John III Megas Komnenos
- Born: Late 13th century
- Died: 3 September 1342; Trebizond
- Dynasty: Komnenos
- Father: Alexios II Megas Komnenos
- Mother: Djiadjak Jaqeli

Anna Anachoutlou (Note: Also known as Anna Azachoutlou and Anna Megale Komnene.) (Greek: Ἄννα Μεγάλη Κομνηνὴ Ἀναχουτλοῦ, romanized: Anna Megalē Komnēnē Anachoutloū; died 3 September 1342) ruled the Empire of Trebizond from 1341 to 1342. She was the eldest daughter of the Trapezuntine emperor Alexios II Megas Komnenos (r. 1297–1330) and had joined a convent as a nun during her father's reign. After the death of her father, Anna's brother Andronikos III (r. 1330–1332), her nephew Manuel II (r. 1332) and her other brother Basil (r. 1332–1340) reigned in rapid succession. After Basil's death, his widow Irene Palaiologina, genealogically unconnected to the ruling Grand Komnenos dynasty of Trebizond, seized power as empress regnant. In June/July 1341, Anna escaped from her convent and rapidly began rallying support to fight against Irene. Despite being a woman and up until recently a nun, and there being several possible male heirs of her dynasty, Anna attracted considerable support from the provincials of the empire, from ethnic minorities such as the Laz and Zan peoples, and from Georgian soldiers, either mercenaries or forces sent by King George V of Georgia.

On 17 July 1341, Anna captured Trebizond without a fight, Irene having abdicated a few days prior, and she was crowned empress. Many of the same elements of the Trapezuntine nobility that had opposed Irene also opposed Anna and instead preferred a male heir, the senior-most possible candidate being Anna's uncle Michael. On 30 July 1341, Michael arrived in Trebizond intending to marry Irene, but after finding her deposed he intended to claim the throne for himself. Though he received a warm reception at first, his entourage was defeated and he was captured and imprisoned the next morning. Having defeated her most obvious rival, Anna continued to rule for just over a year. Though militarily successful, defeating a raiding force of the Aq Qoyunlu in 1342, Anna's internal and economic policy drew some opposition from her own supporters. Anna was deposed by some elements of the Trapezuntine nobility in late August or early September 1342 and was strangled to death on 3 September. On the next day, Michael's son John III captured Trebizond with the support of some of the nobility.

== Early life ==
Anna Anachoutlou, born in the late 13th century, was the eldest daughter of Alexios II Megas Komnenos, who ruled the Empire of Trebizond from 1297 to 1330. She had four older brothers; Andronikos III (emperor 1330–1332), Basil (emperor 1332–1340), Michael and George, and one younger sister, Eudokia. Michael and George were murdered in 1330 by Andronikos III upon his accession to the throne. Early in her life, Anna became a nun and most of her life was one of seclusion in a convent. As a nun, Anna may have been the patron of a small monastery dedicated to Saint Euthymius the Great, possibly in Jerusalem. This might have been the same monastery in which she was a nun. Though there were close religious ties between Trebizond and Jerusalem in this period, Anna's association with this monastery is only supported by a single document of questionable authenticity.

The meaning and etymology of Anna's second surname, Anachoutlou, is not known, but it appears to be of Turkish origin. Perhaps the name derived in some way from her Georgian mother, Jiajak Jaqeli, as such naming patterns began to appear in Georgia at the beginning of the 13th century, (Note: Some researchers in the past, such as Odysseus Lampsidēs, believed Anna and some of her siblings were children of Alexios II by an otherwise unknown Turkish wife or mistress, but this is unsupported by the surviving evidence.) influenced by the country falling under the suzerainty of the Mongol Empire. Alternatively, it is possible that Anachoutlou was a nickname and a combination of Anna's name and the Turkish word kutlu, in which case it would mean 'blessed Anna'. Anna's youngest brothers had similar seemingly Turkish additional surnames: Michael was called Azachoutlou and George was called Achpougas. The name Azachoutlou, sometimes also applied to Anna, was apparently also sometimes used for her maternal Georgian grandfather, Beka I Jaqeli.

== Rise to power ==
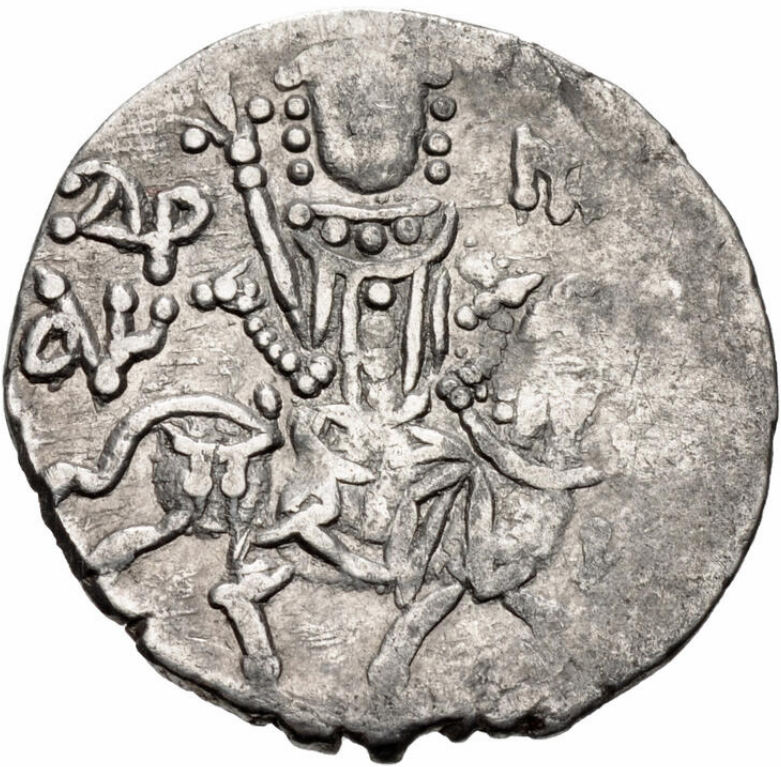
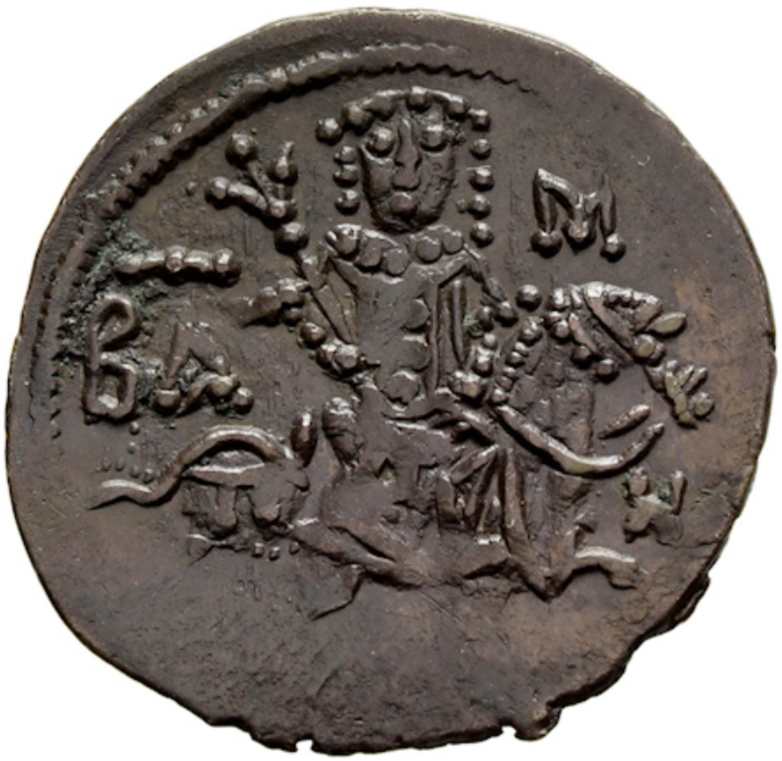
Silver aspron coins minted under the reigns of Anna's brothers Andronikos III (left, r. 1330–1332) and Basil (right, r. 1332–1340). No coins minted under Anna are known.

Anna's brother Andronikos III died on 8 January 1332 and was succeeded by his underage son, Manuel II Megas Komnenos. Manuel II only reigned for eight months, being usurped by his uncle, and Anna's brother, Basil on 23 September 1332. After a childless marriage to Irene Palaiologina, an illegitimate daughter of the Byzantine emperor Andronikos III Palaiologos, Basil in July 1339 took a second wife, also named Irene, with whom he already had two illegitimate sons. On what grounds Basil could claim his marriage to Irene Palaiologina was invalid or if he ever succeeded in actually divorcing his first wife is not clear. He died in obscure circumstances not long thereafter, on 6 April 1340. It was widely suspected that Irene Palaiologina had played some role in Basil's death, especially given that she profited of it by seizing the Trapezuntine throne for herself immediately thereafter. To stabilize her hold on the government, Irene sent her most clear rivals, Basil's second wife and their two sons, to her father in Constantinople as hostages. This move alienated many among the Trapezuntine nobility, who had hoped that the accession of the young princes would lead to the nobility being able to gain further wealth and power. Soon, two conflicting factions had formed in the nobility: the Scholarioi and the Amytzantarioi, formed around the noble families of the same names. Irene was supported by the Amytzantarioi, as well as Italian and Byzantine mercenaries. The Scholarioi considered themselves champions of the memory of Basil and their native rights, according George Finlay opposing Irene as a "Constantinopolitan stranger". Irene held the city of Trebizond itself, but the Scholarioi based themselves in the nearby, and nearly impregnable, monastery dedicated to Saint Eugenios of Trebizond. According to Nicephorus Gregoras, some among the Trapezuntine nobility who opposed Irene hoped to proclaim one of Basil's young illegitimate sons as emperor and rule through him as a puppet.

Irene realized that as both a woman and a foreigner without any legitimate connections to the Trapezuntine throne she would not be able to hold on to power for long. As such, she sent messengers to her father in Constantinople, requesting him to send her a noble whom she could marry and maker her co-ruler, and who would command her armies, lead her administration and help her to suppress her enemies. Unfortunately for Irene, her messengers reached Andronikos at a time when he was busy preparing for a campaign against the Despotate of Epirus, and he died on 15 June 1341, without having had the time to aid Irene in finding a husband. At the same time, Irene's policy of granting favors to only select courtiers alienated some of her supporters and divided her court into several factions of its own.

In June/July 1341, Anna escaped her convent, persuaded by elements of the Trapezuntine nobility, and travelled to the lands of the Laz people, east of Trebizond, where she was proclaimed empress in opposition to Irene. The deaths of her brothers had made Anna and her younger sister Eudokia, married to a Turkish noble, the sole remaining children of Alexios II, and as the eldest sister, Anna was the nearest legitimate heir of Basil. Anna was preferred as empress by the ethnic minorities of the empire, such as the Laz and Zan peoples, as well as most of the provincial population, given that she belonged to the Grand Komnenos dynasty, rather than the foreign Palaiologos family. Anna was also supported by a large contingent of Georgian soldiers, though it is unclear whether this was an official Georgian intervention into Trapezuntine politics by King George V of Georgia, or whether the troops were just mercenaries and locals. It is unknown why these diverse groups preferred Anna over other possible candidates. She was of the Grand Komnenos dynasty, but she was also not only a woman, but also a former nun who had left her convent under questionable circumstances. Her brothers were dead but there were living male members of her family, most prominently Alexios II's brother Michael and Michael's son John, though both resided far away in Constantinople. Rustam Shukurov speculated in 1995 that Anna may have attempted to reinforce her legitimacy by noting that her name formed the end of an inverse AIMA-sequence (Note: The AIMA prophecy was a prophecy concerning the Byzantine Komnenos emperors, foretelling that the first letters of their names in order would spell out the sequence AIMA (it did: Alexios I, John (Ioannes) II, Manuel I and Alexios II ruled in succession). Inversed, AIMA becomes AMIA. Andronikos III was succeeded by his son Manuel II (fulfilling AM), but the legitimate line of succession was broken when Manuel was deposed and killed by Andronikos's brother Basil. With Irene's accession in 1341, the I was fulfilled, with Anna's accession completing the AMIA. The idea is not as far-fetched as it sounds; the AIMA pattern (as well as the AMIA pattern) appears multiple times among the Komnenoi of Trebizond.) and that she was thus destined to rule.

Anna marched at the head of her army directly on Trebizond without encountering any opposition. Numerous locals even joined and reinforced Anna's army on their way. Shortly before Anna arrived at the capital, Irene's popularity and support had plummeted due to losses during raids by the neighbouring Aq Qoyunlu. The raiders had reached as far as the walls of Trebizond itself, while Irene's mercenaries from Constantinople fled without fighting. The raiders burned the countryside and left a number of unburied bodies so great that there was widespread fear that there would be an outbreak of disease. In the face of this, Irene abdicated the throne a few days prior to Anna's arrival. Immediately upon her arrival to Trebizond on 17 July 1341, Anna was admitted into the city and recognized as the new empress.

== Reign ==
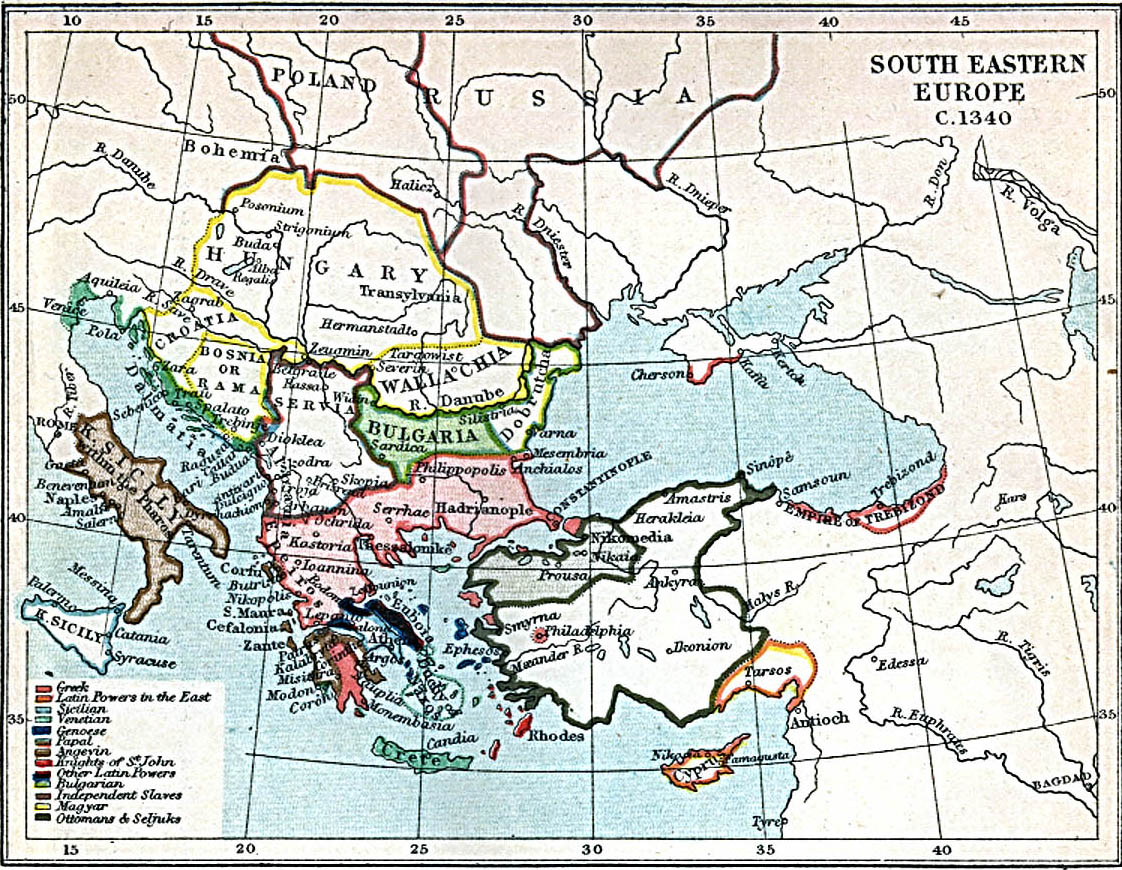
Political map of south-eastern Europe and Anatolia, including Trebizond, c. 1340, around the time of Anna's reign

Though she was preferred over Irene, Anna being a woman meant that many among the Trapezuntine nobility viewed the senior-most male heir, Anna's uncle Michael, as more suitable to rule the empire. The Scholarioi, as well as several unaffiliated noble families, such as the Tzanichitai, Doranitai, Kamachenoi, Kabazitai and Meizomatai, were just as opposed to Anna as they had been to Irene. However, the Amytzantarioi, previously Irene's key supporters, switched over to Anna's side.

On 30 July 1341, less than two weeks after Anna's accession, Michael arrived in Trebizond, accompanied by the Scholarioi Niketas Scholares and Gregory Meizomatis. The reason for his appearance was not actually to claim the throne, but rather that he had been selected by the regents of Andronikos III Palaiologos's young son, John V Palaiologos, as the most suitable husband for Irene Palaiologina. Arriving with three Byzantine warships and a contingent of Byzantine troops, Michael landed near Trebizond without opposition and was received by the other leaders of the Scholarioi. Though it looked likely that Michael himself would claim the throne, his arrival alongside Byzantine troops and his intention to marry Irene frustrated the Laz who had supported Anna and had driven Irene from the throne. Doubtful of whether they had the support of the people, the Laz worked to ensure Anna's continued rule through treachery. Soon after arriving, Michael was received by the local Metropolitan, Akakios, and received oaths of allegiance from various officials and nobles. His coronation as emperor was supposed to take place the following day, but that morning he was met with widespread dissent and opposition. Throughout the night, the Laz, and various nobles sympathetic to Anna's cause, had worked to incite rebellion among the people of the city. After a hard-fought battle, the Laz troops defeated Michael's Byzantine troops and captured the three Byzantine warships that had escorted him. Shortly after this victory, Anna dealt with both Michael and Irene. Irene was sent back to her family in Constantinople, whereafter she disappears from history, and Michael was sent as a prisoner to the town of Oinaion and was later transferred to somewhere in the region of Limnia in the westernmost parts of the empire.

Anna's key supporters expected her administration to be favorable to the empire's provincial and non-Greek population and that she would capably defend the empire from its many external enemies. Though Anna was militarily successful; defeating a second raid by the Aq Qoyunlu in August 1342, her internal and economic policies disappointed some of those who had supported her accession. Anna was not opposed only by the Scholarioi, but also internationally by the Palaiologoi of the Byzantine Empire, disappointed with Irene's deposition, as well as the republics of Venice and Genoa. Anna's victory over the Aq Qoyunlu did nothing to discourage her opponents, and it even appears that some among the Amytzantarioi stopped supporting her around this time.

Though Michael and Irene were no longer threats, the Scholarioi had not been dealt with, and they quickly resolved to get rid of Anna's government through the use of another candidate: Michael's son John. According to later sources, the Scholarioi were opposed to Anna due to the great influence of either the Laz or the Amytzantarioi over the empress and the empire. After Michael's failure to take the Trapezuntine throne, some of the leading Scholarioi figures, including Niketas Scholares, Gregory Meizomatis, Michael Meizomatis and Constantine Doranites, fled from Trebizond aboard a Venetian ship. Also accompanied by two warships of their own, the group travelled to Constantinople in order to implore John to claim the throne. John accepted and the group left Constantinople on 17 August. On the way back, they hired an additional three galleys from Genoa.

In late August/September, the Scholarioi succeeding in deposing Anna and on 3 September 1342 she was strangled to death. A few days previously, on 27 August, John and his entourage arrived in Trebizond and disembarked in the eastern parts of the city, near its hippodrome. After short bursts of fighting in the streets, John's supporters forced their way into the imperial palace on 4 September 1342 and John became emperor as John III Megas Komnenos. After John's accession there was a purge of Anna's supporters, with many Lazes and Amytzantarioi being murdered, as well as many of Anna's supporters in the empire's provinces. In 1344, a monk by the name of Gerasimos, who lived at the monastery of Euthymius the Great in Jerusalem, wrote a remembrance of Anna.

== Notes ==
Anna Anachoutlou Komnenos dynasty Died: 4 September 1342
Regnal titles
Preceded by Irene	Empress regnant of Trebizond; 1341–1342	Succeeded by John III
