= Irene of Trebizond =

Empress Consort of Trebizond
- Tenure: 1339
- Spouse: Basil of Trebizond
- Issue: Anna, Grand Duchess of Nizhny Novgorod-Suzdal; Alexios of Trebizond; Alexios III of Trebizond; Maria; Theodora

Irene of Trebizond (died around 1382) was an Empress consort of Trebizond as the bigamous wife of Basil of Trebizond. She had an important position in the regency of her son Alexios III of Trebizond in 1341-1352.

== Life ==
Not much is known of Irene's early life before she became Basil's mistress; "the Byzantine historian called [her] a courtesan, but the Trapezuntine chronicler a lady of Trebizond," writes William Miller. She had two sons with him before he married her in 1339. This marriage engendered much protest from the Patriarch of Constantinople, John XIV Kalekas. Their marriage only lasted about nine months before he died after a short illness; Miller writes again, "It was whispered that the discarded Empress had murdered him privily, and her conduct lent some colour to the suspicion, for she was evidently prepared to profit by his demise." Irene Palaiologina, the so-called "discarded Empress", and her supporters seized power immediately and sent Irene of Trebizond with her two young sons, Alexios and John, off to Constantinople to the safe-keeping of Palaiologina's father, Andronikos III Palaiologos.

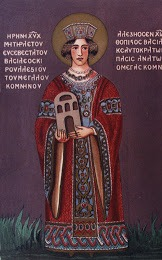
Modern representation of Irene of Trebizond

While Irene and children were in exile Trebizond witnessed palace revolutions, both in Trebizond (Trapezuntine Civil War) and in Constantinople (Byzantine civil war). The Byzantine regency government of John V Palaiologos supported her late husband's uncle Michael of Trebizond and also Basil's cousin John III of Trebizond in their power bids for power in Trebizond, but when John VI Kantakouzenos won the Byzantine civil war, he lent his support to a power bid on the behalf of Irene's son John. Her other son Alexios is not mentioned after his departure from Trebizond and may have died soon after arriving in Constantinople. This bid for the throne was supported by Niketas Scholares, the leader of the powerful Scholares clan whom Michael had alienated. The bid was successful and overturned the weak and violent government of Michael and brought Irene's son to the throne, who took the name Alexios.

Alexios' accession at the age of 13 also marked the beginning of Irene's own power in the government of Trebizond. She presumably struggled for power with the nobles and especially with the Doranites family, who led an unsuccessful revolt in the capital when Alexios had not been on the throne six months. Although that rebellion was quashed, her son Alexios retired to the castle fortress of Tripolis for security. In 1341 she accompanied an expedition to Limnia with Michael Panaretos and seized the city from the rebel Constantine Doranites. She accompanied a second campaign led by her son in January 1352 against the cup-bearer John Tzanichites, who had seized by force his ancestral castle of Tzanicha.

After this point, Irene's presence in the historical record becomes more intermittent. In 1367 she accompanied her son Alexios when her granddaughter Anna was married to the king of Georgia. She also was present at the baptism of her great-grandson Basil, renamed later Alexios IV of Trebizond in 1382, which is the last time she is mentioned in recorded history. What happened to her afterwards is unknown.

== Issue ==
- Alexios III of Trebizond
- John
- Anna
- Maria
- Theodora

Royal titles
Preceded by Irene Palaiologina	Empress consort of Trebizond; 1339	Succeeded by Acropolitissa
