= Niketas Scholares =

Niketas Scholares (Greek: Νικήτας Σχολάρης, fl. 1341–1361), was a Byzantine Greek aristocrat and one of the leading officials of the Empire of Trebizond, eventually becoming megas doux. Niketas was a leader of the Scholarioi faction in Trebizond during the civil wars of the mid-14th century.

== Life ==
Niketas' parents are not recorded. Because John Lazaropoulos named one of the factions that emerged after the death of Emperor Basil (6 April 1340) the Scholarioi, which was reminiscent of the former Byzantine military unit of the Scholai, George Finlay concluded that his family had its origins with the members of the imperial bodyguard in Constantinople at the time of its fall to the Fourth Crusade. While it is plausible that refugees from Constantinople relocated in Trebizond, where they restored their fortunes and had heirs, it is more likely a coincidence that Niketas Scholares bore the name of this unit, than that his immediate ancestors held a commission in it.

The Scholarioi, who were led by Sebastos Tzaniches the megas stratopedarches, were opposed to the Amytzarantai, who supported the first wife of Emperor Basil, Empress Irene Palaiologina, who had seized the throne after her husband's death. Following a pitched battle fought in the streets of Trebizond, which was ended when the megas doux John the Eunuch marched from Limnia and joined the faction supporting Irene, Niketas and Gregory Meitzomates fled to Constantinople. There they convinced Michael Megas Komnenos to return to Trebizond with them and become Emperor. Escorted by two or three vessels manned with mercenaries, Niketas and Michael Komnenos arrived in Trebizond on 30 July 1341. However, that night aristocratic backers of Anna separated Michael from his supporters while their armed followers slaughtered the sailors Niketas and Gregory brought with them to support Michael's candidacy. The next day Michael was sent to captivity at Oinaion, and a few days later the dethroned Irene was put on a Frankish ship bound for Constantinople.

Niketas and Gregory escaped serious injury in the counter-coup, for Michael Panaretos states that both fled the city and sailed on a Venetian ship to Constantinople, accompanied by Constantine Doranites, his son John, and Gregory Meitzomates' brother Michael, reaching that city on 10 September 1341. There they recruited John Megas Komnenos to be Emperor. John agreed to their proposal, the group hired three Genoese galleys and with two of their own departed Constantinople on 17 August 1342 and took control of Trebizond on 4 September.

The aristocrats who elevated John apparently grew dissatisfied with him, for Niketas freed his father Michael from captivity at Limnia and put him on the throne on May 1344, and had John banished to the monastery of St. Sabas. In return, Michael granted Niketas the title of megas doux, Gregory Meitzomates the title of stratopedarches, while Gregory's son was made epikernes, John Kabazites megas logothetes, Niketas Scholaris's son parakoimomenos, Michael Meitzomates amytzantarios, and Stephan Tzanichites received the title of megas konostaulos. Thus the Scholarioi achieved overwhelming control of the government.

The power of the Scholarioi proved unpopular with the populace of Trebizond, who revolted against their oligarchy. In November 1345 Niketas was arrested and imprisoned, along with his associate Gregory Meitzomates and others of their party. However, the Emperor Michael, old and sick, released Niketas from prison and restored to him his former office of megas doux on December 13, 1349. Niketas strengthened his position by marrying the daughter of Michael Sampson, the Intendant of the Palace. Then on December 22, Niketas led a coup that deposed Michael and place on the throne John, the son of Emperor Basil, who took the name of Alexios III of Trebizond. This was the moment of Niketas' greatest power in the Empire.

From that moment, Niketas' power started to erode. The young age of the Emperor invited the restless aristocracy to attempt to overthrow him and replace him with one of their own. The first year and a half of Alexios' reign was wracked with civil strife, which was marked by Niketas being stripped of his rank and becoming the prisoner of Theodore Doranites, known as Pileles. But Pileles, his son, and his son-in-law were strangled in the castle of Kenchrina in July 1352, allowing Niketas to return to power. By that time, young Alexios had strengthened his own position, and no longer needed Niketas. In June 1354 the megas doux fled to Kerasunt, where he and his supporters prepared to resist Alexios. For three months the rebels and Alexios negotiated, apparently hoping to avoid an open revolt. In March of the next year, Niketas, his son the parakoimomenos, and Basil Choupakes the protovestiarios, led a fleet against Trebizond which failed to accomplish anything; that May Emperor Alexios led his own fleet against Kerasunt and captured that city. Niketas was, however, away at Kenchrina which was the rebels' last stronghold, which Alexios promptly besieged. Niketas held out in Kenchrina until October, and the surrender of that city ended the revolt.

Although Niketas spent the rest of his life in confinement in Trebizond, Alexios showed his regard for the former megas doux by walking in white robes during Niketas' funeral procession, which were the garb of Imperial mourning.
