= Manuel II =

Manuel II may refer to:

- Manuel II of Trebizond (c. 1324–1333), Emperor of Trebizond
- Manuel II Palaiologos (1350–1425), Byzantine Emperor
- Patriarch Manuel II of Constantinople, Patriarch of Constantinople from 1244 to 1255
- Manuel II of Portugal (1889–1932), King of Portugal
- Manuel II, Patriarch of Lisbon (1888–1977)
