= Irene Palaiologina of Trebizond =

Irene Palaiologina
- Empress and Autocrat of all the East and Perateia

Empress regnant of Trebizond
- Reign: 6 April 1340 – 17 July 1341
- Predecessor: Basil
- Successor: Anna

Empress consort of Trebizond
- Tenure: 1335–1339
- Born: c. 1315
- Spouse: Basil Megas Komnenos
- Dynasty: Palaiologos
- Father: Andronikos III Palaiologos

Irene Palaiologina (Greek: Ειρήνη Παλαιολογίνα, romanized: Eirēnē Palaiologina), (c. 1315 – after 1341) was Empress regnant of Trebizond from April 6, 1340, to July 17, 1341. She was an illegitimate daughter of the Byzantine Emperor Andronikos III Palaiologos, and she married Emperor Basil of Trebizond in 1335.

== Marriage Issues ==
Soon after the marriage, however, Basil took a mistress, also named Irene, and in 1339 divorced Irene Palaiologina with the connivance of the local clergy. Irene Palaiologina's cause was backed by Patriarch John XIV of Constantinople and she probably still retained some position of influence in Trebizond. On April 6, 1340, she probably poisoned Basil and seized the throne for herself by what reads in the account of Nicephorus Gregoras as a palace coup. Her position was tenuous because of the means by which she gained the throne, and because she was not a member of the ruling Komnenian dynasty. To shore up her position, she sent off her dead husband's second wife and sons to Constantinople where they could be watched over by her father.

In spite of her precipitous actions, Irene believed the Empire needed a man to rule it, and appealed to her father to send her a husband from amongst the Byzantine nobles. However Andronikos III was away from Constantinople -- William Miller describes how messengers searched Thessaloniki and Akarania for him—and he died on June 15, 1341, before he could answer his daughter's request. Meanwhile, a rumor circulated in Trebizond that the Empress had taken the megas domestikos as her lover, which led to widespread rioting.

== Civil War ==
The first round of the civil war began shortly after her accession. Three opposing parties had formed: first was that of Irene, the family of Amytzantarioi, and her Byzantine mercenaries provided courtesy of her father; second was of the opposing archons under the sebastos Tzanichites, the captain-general of the Scholarioi and a part of the imperial bodyguard loyal to the memory of their late Emperor; and the third party was that of megas doux John the Eunuch, who held the fortress of Limnia. The archons under Tzanichites encamped themselves in the Monastery of St. Eugenios within the walls of the city, near the imperial palace but sufficiently impregnable. For two months this party sat watching the faction of Irene and her supporters, engaging in daily skirmishes to no permanent result, until July 2, 1340, when the megas doux decided for Irene. John the Eunuch directed his siege engines against the monastery, destroying it almost completely, and defeating the rebels. Tzanchites was amongst the rebels taken as prisoners and sent to Limnia where they were executed a year later.

At the same time, affairs of the Empire went worse as the Turkmen attacked Trebizond and marched up to the walls of the capital itself. A first attack was repelled on the Parcharia ("the downs"), but the second (July 1341) could not be stopped by the demoralized army of Irene, and the Turkmen set fire to much of Trebizond without being able to capture it. The catastrophe was exacerbated by the outbreak of an epidemic, which Michael Panaretos claims arose from the foul stench of the rotting corpses of horses and men.

== Deposition ==
Irene's reign was brought to an end by the arrival of her sister-in-law Anna, Basil's sister. Prior to the second invasion and the fire, Anna had been convinced to abandon her monastic vows, and was acclaimed empress in Lazica July 17, 1341. Miller writes, "The ease with which she accomplished the dethronement of Irene may be explained by the fact that, whereas the latter represented the foreign court of Byzantium, she represented the local dynasty, which in nearly a century and a half had thoroughly identified itself with the country."

But Irene's fortunes seemed to revive 13 days later when Michael, her dead husband's uncle, arrived on July 30, accompanied by three Byzantine warships and Niketas Scholares, captain-general of the Scholarioi, to be emperor and Irene's husband. The nobles and the archbishop Akakios welcomed Michael at first, and took oaths of allegiance to him, and invited him up to the palace of his ancestors; then, when night fell, they made him their prisoner and slaughtered his unsuspecting escort. Irene watched Michael put on board a vessel to Oinaion and captivity before she was put aboard a Frankish vessel and sent back to Constantinople. Nothing further is known of her fate.

Irene Palaiologina of Trebizond Palaiologos dynasty Born: c. 1315 Died: unknown
Regnal titles
Preceded by Basil	Empress regnant of Trebizond; 1340–1341	Succeeded by Anna
Royal titles
Preceded by Djiadjak Jaqeli	Empress consort of Trebizond; 1335–1339	Succeeded by Irene of Trebizond
