= Alexius II =

Alexius II may refer to:

- Alexios II Komnenos (1167–1183), Byzantine Emperor
- Alexios II of Trebizond (1297–1330), Emperor of Trebizond
- Patriarch Alexy II of Moscow (1990–2008), Patriarch of Moscow and All Russia
