= Manuel Komnenos (disambiguation) =

Manuel Komnenos (1118–1180) was a Byzantine emperor.

Manuel Komnenos may also refer to:

- Manuel Erotikos Komnenos (955/960 – c. 1020), progenitor of the Komnenian dynasty
- Manuel Komnenos (kouropalates) (c. 1045 – 1071), older brother of Alexios I Komnenos
- Manuel Komnenos (son of Andronikos I) (1145–1185), eldest son of Andronikos I Komnenos and father of Alexios I of Trebizond

== See also ==
- Manuel I of Trebizond or Manuel I Megas Komnenos (died 1263), Emperor of Trebizond
- Manuel II of Trebizond or Manuel II Megas Komnenos (c. 1324–1333), Emperor of Trebizond
- Manuel III of Trebizond or Manuel IIII Megas Komnenos (1364–1417), Emperor of Trebizond
