= John III of Trebizond =

John III Megas Komnenos
- Emperor and Autocrat of all the East and Perateia
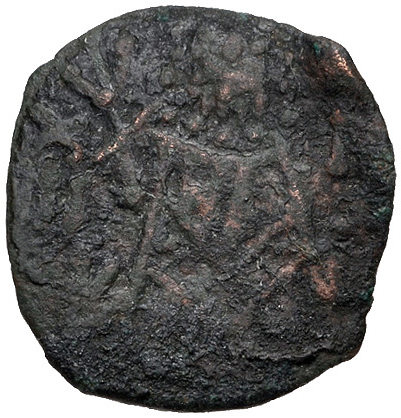
- Coin depicting John III Megas Komnenos

Emperor of Trebizond
- Reign: 4 September 1342 – 3 May 1344
- Predecessor: Anna
- Successor: Michael
- Born: c.1321
- Died: 1362 (aged 40–41)
- Dynasty: Komnenos
- Father: Michael Megas Komnenos
- Mother: Acropolitissa

John III Megas Komnenos or Grand Comnenus (Greek: Ἰωάννης Μέγας Κομνηνός, Iōánnēs Mégas Komnēnós; c. 1321 – 1362) was emperor of Trebizond from September 4, 1342, to May 3, 1344. He was a son of Emperor Michael of Trebizond (who had reigned for a day in 1341) and Acropolitissa, a daughter of Constantine Acropolites.

John lived most of his life in Constantinople where his father had lived since c. 1297. When Michael became Emperor of Trebizond for a day in 1341 and was quickly deposed and imprisoned by megas doux John the Eunuch, John was still in Constantinople. However, in 1342 the leaders of the Scholarioi, Niketas Scholares and Gregory Meitzomates, visited him there and persuaded the young man to come with them to Trebizond and take the throne. With the approval of the Byzantine government, the group set out for Trebizond in September 1342 after enlisting the support of three Genoese galleys, bringing their little fleet to a total of five ships. After a short but fierce fight John and his supporters captured the city on September 4, aided by a popular uprising in their favor. After the coronation of John III as emperor, the deposed Empress Anna Anachoutlou was strangled, and her noble supporters executed or exiled shortly following John's coronation in Panagia Chrysokephalos Church.

Both William Miller and George Finlay describe John III as a weak and dissolute ruler, who cared only for entertainment, self-indulgence, and luxury; he showed no interest over his own father who remained the prisoner of megas doux John the Eunuch. Upon the death of the megas doux, Niketas marched to Limnia where he freed Michael then returned with him to Trebizond to depose John. On May 3, 1344 John was banished to the monastery of St. Sabas (where he was kept under a Byzantine guard) and his father was restored to the throne.

The deposed emperor was eventually transferred by his father to Constantinople and from there in 1345 to Adrianople. He escaped from there in c. 1357 and made his way to Sinope to regain his throne, only to die in that city in 1362. Michael Panaretos tells us John had a son, but not his name; all that Panaretos records about him is that he escaped from captivity in 1363 and fled first to Caffa, then to Galata.

John III of Trebizond Komnenid dynasty Born: c. 1321 Died: 1362
Regnal titles
Preceded by Anna	Emperor of Trebizond; 1342–1344	Succeeded by Michael
