= Michael of Trebizond =

Michael Megas Komnenos
- Emperor and Autocrat of all the East and Perateia
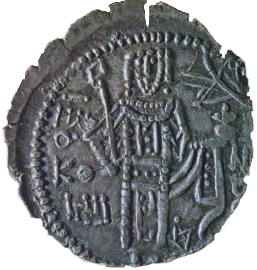
- Coin depicting Michael Megas Komnenos

Emperor of Trebizond
- Reign: 3 May 1344 – 13 December 1349
- Predecessor: John III
- Successor: Alexios III
- Born: c. 1288
- Died: After 1355; Constantinople (modern-day Istanbul, Turkey)
- Spouse: Acropolitissa
- Issue: John III Megas Komnenos
- Dynasty: Komnenos
- Father: John II Megas Komnenos
- Mother: Eudokia Palaiologina

Michael Megas Komnenos (Greek: Μιχαήλ Μέγας Κομνηνός, Mikhaēl Megas Komnēnos; c. 1288 – after 1355) was Emperor of Trebizond from 3 May 1344 to 13 December 1349. He was a younger son of Emperor John II of Trebizond and Eudokia Palaiologina.

== Early life ==
Based on Nikephoros Gregoras' statement that Michael was 56 in 1344, one can deduce he was born around 1288. Michael was brought to Constantinople c. 1297 by his mother Eudokia, following the death of Emperor John II and his brother Alexios' ascension to the throne. A few years later Eudokia returned to Trebizond, presumably leaving Michael behind in Constantinople.

His life is a blank for the next decades. Michael was presumably left in the care of his uncle, the Emperor Andronikos II Palaiologos, whose attempts to dictate whom his brother and their mother would marry were thwarted; it is unclear what effect these failures had on Michael. It is certain that Michael was not confined to a monastery, for he married the daughter of the nobleman Constantine Acropolites, Acropolitissa, by whom he had a son, John III. Then followed a period of civil war between Andronikos II and his grandson Andronikos III Palaiologos, by which time Michael was of middle age; which side in the war he supported, or if he even took a side in this conflict, is again unknown. Lastly, a number of his brother's family – first Alexios' son Basil, then Basil's two sons – came to Constantinople as refugees from the conflict in Trebizond. It is unknown what contact Michael had with them, if he provided them succor, or if he was even aware they were in the city.

It is in 1341 that Michael's history is once again known. In that year a group of representatives of the Scholarioi faction, led by Niketas Scholares and Gregory Meitzomates, arrived from Trebizond and convinced the regents of the young Emperor John V Palaiologos to allow Michael to return. Once there he would marry the deposed Empress Irene Palaiologina and assume the imperial throne.

When Michael's three ships reached Trebizond on 30 July 1341, he found Irene had been deposed and his own niece, Anna Anachoutlou, ruling as empress. As the legitimate male descendant of the ruling family, Michael received the support of much of the populace and was acclaimed emperor. Some of the nobility, led by the Metropolitan Akakios, received him as their lord and escorted him into the palace. As soon as night fell, however, the nobles imprisoned Michael, not wishing to be ruled by a mature and forceful monarch. Anna's Lazic troops dispersed Michael's supporters and plundered his ships. The following day he was sent off to Oinaion and then Limnia, where he was held captive by the megas doux John the Eunuch.

When Michael's own son, John III, became emperor in September 1342, Michael remained in prison. John's incompetent rule alienated his chief supporters, chief of these was Niketas who marched with the army to Limnia (where John the Eunuch had recently been slain), freed Michael and returned with him to Trebizond. John III was deposed and sent to the monastery of St Sabas under a Byzantine guard, while the nobles supporting him were killed. Michael was crowned on 3 May 1344.

== Reign ==
Michael granted Niketas the title of megas doux and was forced to sign the document which gave Niketas and his ministers almost all power in the Empire, promising to seek their counsel in all official actions. This constitutional experiment was short-lived, because the greatest opposition came from the people of Trebizond. They were infuriated to see the Emperor stripped of his effective authority and rose up in revolt against the oligarchy of the Scholarioi. Michael swiftly took advantage of the opportunity, and arrested and imprisoned Niketas in 1345. Also, he sent his son John off to Constantinople and then Adrianople where he was to be kept prisoner to prevent him from becoming a further focus for the discontented nobles of Trebizond.

Taking advantage of the instability in Trebizond, the Turkmen attacked the Empire in 1346, capturing the towns of Hagios Andreas and Oinaion. In September 1347, the Black Death struck Trebizond, raging for seven months. Its effects on the city is unclear: Andrew Libadenos, who was at Trebizond at the time, makes no mention of the epidemic, while Michael Panaretos describes how the Black Death carried off "many: children, husbands, wives, brothers, sisters, mothers, and kinsmen." Another Turkmen invasion the following year led to a three-day battle. Despite the victory, Michael's reputation as ruler was not strengthened.

In 1348, the Genoese seized Kerasous, the second most important city of the Empire in revenge for a massacre of Genoese by the Trapezuntines some years earlier. In May 1349, a Genoese expedition from Caffa was launched against Trebizond. The small Trapezuntine fleet under Megas doux John Kabazites was destroyed and the people of Trebizond responded to this defeat by killing any Westerner they found in the capital. Eventually, peace was reached with the Genoese, but in exchange for Kerasous they were given the fortress of Leonkastron. From now on Trebizond's commercial capacity was lessened even further, as the Genoese came to increasingly command the lucrative Black Sea trade of the port.

At that time the ailing Michael was both discredited and completely unable to govern the crumbling Empire. He was deposed on 13 December 1349 by Megas doux Niketas, whom he had been forced to release from prison. Niketas and his supporters placed on the throne his nephew John, the son of Emperor Basil, who had been sent by the Byzantine Emperor John VI Kantakouzenos to Trebizond, and arrived on December 22. Upon assuming the crown, John took the name Alexios III.

The deposed Emperor Michael was forced to become a monk at the cave monastery of St Sabas. In 1351, he was sent to Constantinople. Michael was released by Emperor John V Palaiologos in 1355; despite being in his sixties, he set forth to Trebizond, hoping to recover his throne. Michael advanced as far as Sumela Monastery, but was prevented from entering his former capital. He returned to Constantinople, where he died.

== Acropolitissa ==
Michael is known to have married the daughter of the Byzantine megas logothetes Constantine Acropolites, and Maria Komnene Tornikina, but the name of their daughter has not been recovered. For convenience, scholars have given her the name Acropolitissa, the feminine form of "Acropolites". Little is known about her; Constantine Acropolites provides most of what we directly know about her. The Emperor Andronikos II Palaiologos attempted to marry Michael Komnenos' older brother, Alexios to the daughter of one of his ministers, only to be foiled when Alexios married a princess of Georgia without telling his uncle. Nicol observes that "it would be quite in keeping with the elaborate dynastic and marital schemes of Andronikos II that, having failed to marry off the daughter of one of his ministers to the Emperor of Trebizond, he should encourage or arrange the marriage of the daughter of his Grand Logothete to that Emperor's brother." She was most likely dead by 1341, for that year Michael Megas Komnenos was invited to return to Trebizond and marry the reigning Empress, Irene Palaiologina, widow of his nephew Basil of Trebizond.

=== Other possible descendants ===
The "Georgian Chronicle" of the 18th century reports George V of Georgia marrying a daughter of "the Greek Emperor, Lord Michael Komnenos". However the reigning dynasty of the Byzantine Empire in the 14th century were the Palaiologoi, not the Komnenoi. The marriage of a daughter of Michael IX Palaiologos and his wife Rita of Armenia to a Georgian ruler is not recorded in Byzantine sources. Neither is the existence of any illegitimate daughters of Michael IX. Whether this was a daughter of Michael Komnenos of Trebizond and Acropolitissa is unknown.

Michael of Trebizond Komnenid dynasty Born: 1288 Died: unknown
Regnal titles
Preceded by John III	Emperor of Trebizond; 1344–1349	Succeeded by Alexios III
