= Scholarius =

Scholarius (Σχολάριος), Scholares (Σχολάρης) or Scholaris may be:

- Greek scholars in the Renaissance
- the title of a medieval scholar in general
- a member of the Scholae Palatinae military unit
- the epithet of Gennadius Scholarius
- the epithet of Niketas Scholares
