= Andronikos III =

Andronikos III may refer to:

- Andronikos III Palaiologos (1297–1341), Byzantine emperor 1328–1341
- Andronikos III of Trebizond (1310–1332), Emperor of Trebizond from 1330 to 1332
