= Constantine Doranites =

Aristocrat of the Empire of Trebizond

Constantine Doranites (Greek: Κωνσταντῖνος Δωρανίτης), was a Trapezuntine aristocrat and military leader in the Empire of Trebizond. A prominent member of the Doranites aristocratic family from Trebizond, Constantine Doranites’ activity should be viewed within the context of the civil strife that disrupted the Empire of Trebizond in the 14th century.

In 1340–41 Constantine took part in the civil war under the leadership of Sebastos Tzaniches the megas stratopedarch, who was opposed to Empress Irene Palaiologina, which ended with the defeat of the Megas Stratopedarch. His actions after this defeat are not clear until 1341/2 when he fled to Constantinople with Niketas Scholares and Gregory Meitzomates. There they recruited John Megas Komnenos to return to Trebizond, where he was crowned emperor in September 1342. In 1344, at the accession of Emperor Michael Megas Komnenos, he was granted the dignity of protovestiarios. In 1351 he was the kephalatikeuon (provincial governor) of the Limnia, and revolted against Alexios III Megas Komnenos without any success.

He was the brother of Theodore Pileles Doranites, likewise a senior court official in Trebizond, and had a son, John, who received the court title of pinkernes in 1344.

== Sources ==
- Lampsidis, O. (ed.), ″Μιχαήλ του Παναρέτου περί των Μεγάλων Κομνηνών″, Archeion Pontou, 22 (1958), pp. 1–124.
- Trapp, Erich; Beyer, Hans-Veit; Walther, Rainer; Sturm-Schnabl, Katja; Kislinger, Ewald; Leontiadis, Ioannis; Kaplaneres, Sokrates (1976–1996). Prosopographisches Lexikon der Palaiologenzeit (in German). Vienna: Verlag der Österreichischen Akademie der Wissenschaften. ISBN 3-7001-3003-1.
- Vougiouklaki, Penelope (2008). "Constantine Doranites". Encyclopaedia of the Hellenic World, Asia Minor. Foundation of the Hellenic World.
