= Thomaïs of Lesbos =

Eastern Orthodox patron saint of marriage

Saint Thomaїs of Lesbos

Protector of Marriage
- Born: between 909 and 913; Lesbos
- Died: between 947 and 951; Constantinople
- Venerated in: Eastern Orthodox Church
- Feast: 3 January

Thomaїs of Lesbos (Greek: Θωμαΐς; 909–913 – c. 947–951) was a Byzantine miracle-worker. Thomaїs is venerated in the Eastern Orthodox Church, her feast day is celebrated on 3 January and she is a patron saint of marriage. Her hagiography predominantly focuses on the years she lived in Constantinople with her husband, Stephen. Thomaїs's sainthood is unusual among Byzantine women saints, because she achieved sanctity as a married laywoman – she never entered a convent or hermitage. Thomaїs's endurance of intimate partner violence throughout her thirteen year marriage to Stephen, who frequently beat her as punishment for her charitable actions and expressions of piety, is the hallmark of her sanctity. Stephen ultimately killed Thomaїs: she died at the age of 38 from the physical trauma caused by years of domestic abuse. Fourteen miracles are attributed to the saint in her vita, five whilst she was alive and nine after her death.

The earliest known Life of Thomaїs is estimated to have been composed in the mid-tenth century, an edition of which can be found in the Acta Sanctorum Novembris volume 4, edited by Hippolyte Delehaye (1925). This primary hagiography of Thomaїs has been translated from Byzantine Greek into English by Paul Halsall (1996): "Life of St. Thomaїs of Lesbos", in Alice-Mary Talbot (ed.), Holy Women of Byzantium: Ten Saints' Lives in English Translation; and provides key information on the saint's life, death and miracles.

== Life ==
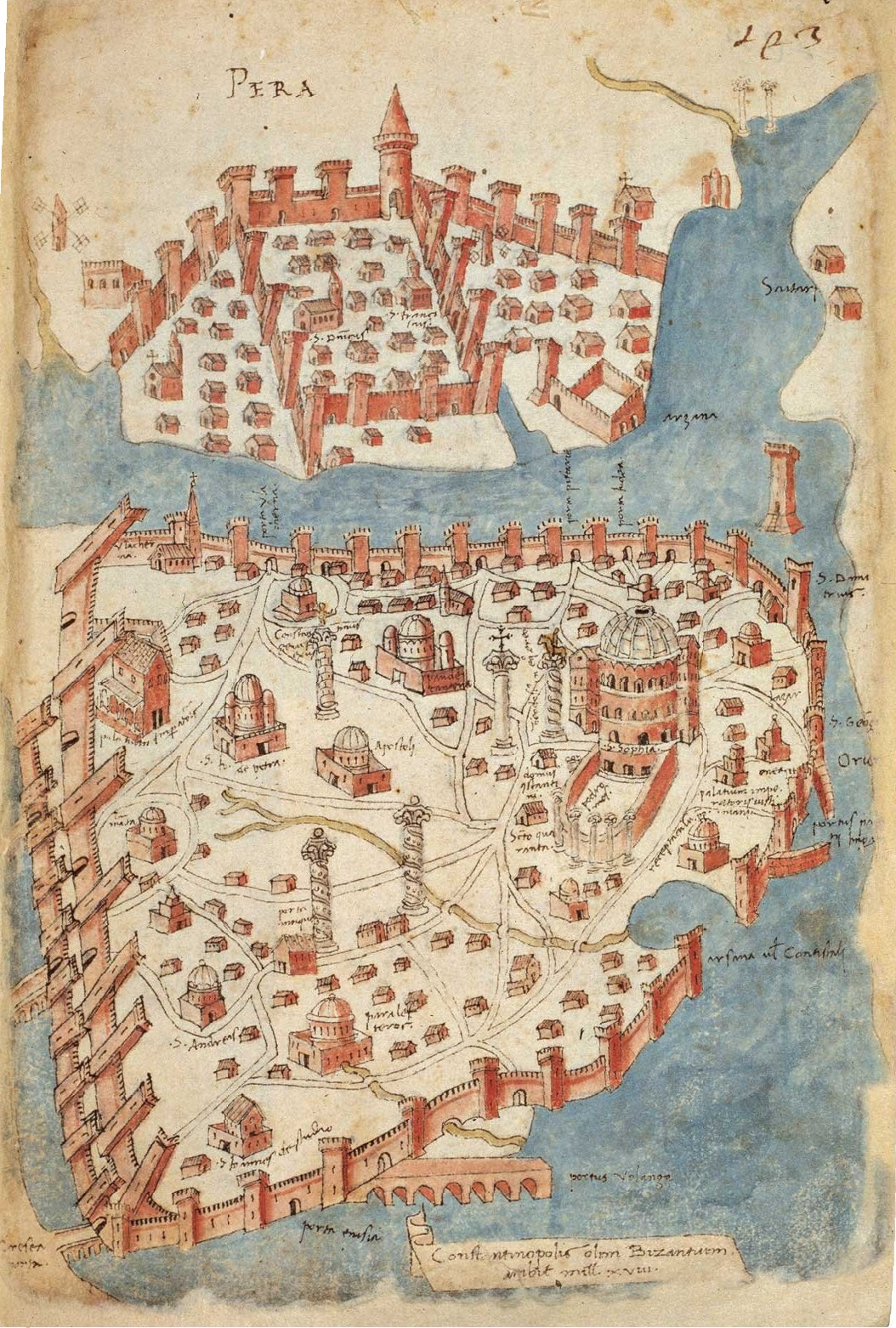
c.1420s–1430 map of Constantinople by Cristoforo Buondelmonti, a Florentine cartographer, from the volume Liber insularum archipelagi.

Thomaїs was born in Lesbos to Michael and Kale. While Thomaїs's exact year of birth remains unknown, the estimated date range is between 909 CE and 913 CE. For many years, Michael and Kale were unable to have children, until one night when the Virgin Mary informed Kale in a dream that she would bear a daughter. At some point after Thomaїs's birth, the family moved to the Bosporus region in modern day Türkiye, possibly to the city of Chalcedon, where they raised her piously: "she continued to be strengthened in the virtues, devoted to the worship of God, and adorned by all forms of goodness".

At the age of 24, Thomaїs was forced to marry Stephen. She had no desire for married life and wished to remain a virgin; this resistance helps to explain why Thomaїs married at a later age than was expected of women in Byzantium. The couple lived together in Constantinople, they never had children and were of a lower socio-economic class – Stephen was a sailor and Thomaїs a weaver. She would sell the clothes she made, as well as give them to the poor.

Thomaїs was a victim of intimate partner violence throughout their marriage; Stephen would often beat her as punishment for her pious acts of charity, such as giving away their household income. Thomaїs was regularly out in the streets of Constantinople attending to the poor and visiting places of worship; it has been suggested that as a lower class woman, it was more acceptable for her to be out in public by herself. While imperial women were known for their acts of charity, this was often indirect, unlike Thomaїs who was "hands-on" when helping those in need. One example of her extreme charitable activity is when she came across a poor and naked man in the streets and so gave him the clothes off her back. Stephen, enraged by his wife's public nakedness, violently beat her. Thomaїs was a miracle worker, both while she was alive and after her death.

On 1 January, c. 947–951 CE, Thomaïs died aged 38 as a result of the "bodily sufferings" inflicted by Stephen over their thirteen year marriage. Thomaїs was buried in the grounds of the same convent, ta Mikra Romaiou (τὰ μικρὰ ´Ρωμαίου), that her mother, Kale, had held the position of superior. For forty days after her death, a series of miracles were posthumously attributed to Thomaïs. Upon witnessing her first posthumous miracle, the nuns moved the saint's remains into the church. The final recorded miracle is the healing of Stephen, who had been possessed by the devil as punishment for the abuse he inflicted on Thomaїs.

== Miracles ==
In the version of Thomaїs's Life found in Acta Sanctorum Novembris and translated by Paul Halsall (1996), "Life of St. Thomaїs of Lesbos," in Holy Women of Byzantium: Ten Saints' Lives in English Translation, ed. by Alice-Mary Talbot, 14 miracles are attributed to the saint.

=== Prehumous ===
- During a religious procession a possessed man falls to the saint's feet and begs for the forgiveness of his sins. Thomaїs anoints the man with oil which heals him. This first miracle exposes the saint's virtuousness.
- Thomaїs heals a eunuch, named Constantine, of paralysis and quinsy by anointing him with the same water she had just used to wash her own hands.
- A possessed woman falls at the saint's feet while Thomaїs is at church, praying to an icon of the Virgin Mary. The woman is distraught and begs her for mercy, so Thomaїs heals her by anointing the woman with oil.
- Thomaїs heals a sexually promiscuous woman, likely a sex worker, who suffered for six years of severe hemorrhaging. The saint heals the woman with oil, but only upon agreeing to the condition that she: "abandon all intercourse with men during the divine and great feasts, and <abandon also> the prohibited activities you habitually perform. Cast as far away as possible your wallowing in the mud of passions."
- Another sex worker asks Thomaїs for help. The hagiographer emphasises the sexual immorality of this woman, as well as her further sins of material excess and greed. The saint heals the woman's breast cancer on the condition that she gets married and only has sexual intercourse with her husband.

=== Posthumous ===
- A man who is possessed by a demon goes to Thomaїs's coffin and begs her for assistance. He is swiftly cured.
- A nun is healed of demonic possession after hitting her own head on the saint's tomb.
- A wealthy man of high birth and rank, named Eutychianos, was afflicted with palsy as a result of his immoral behaviour. This behaviour, however, had been caused by demons who had consorted with "sorcerers and wizards." Failing to gain a medical cure, Eutychianos is healed after visiting Thomaїs's tomb.
- A man suffering from epilepsy and partial paralysis is cured when he visits the saint's tomb.
- Thomaїs answers the prayers of an aggrieved fisherman, who had lost his fishing equipment and catch in a storm. Not only does she help him recover his nets, they are also filled with fish.
- The nuns of the convent lose a prayer book. The saint reveals to them that the book can be found in her tomb.
- A woman with severe abdominal pain goes to Thomaїs's tomb and is quickly cured.
- A monk called Symeon is upset after losing his prayer stool. Thomaїs reminds the monk to whom he had last lent the stool, a friend who had no intention of returning it, and it is recovered.
- Thomaїs's husband, Stephen, is possessed by a demon and tormented as punishment for abusing the saint. Stephen seeks healing from Thomaїs at her tomb and is cured.

== Legacy ==
Saint Thomaïs is venerated in the Eastern Orthodox Church as an example of piety in married life. She is recognized for attaining sainthood while living as a married laywoman rather than as a monastic or hermit. Accounts of her life also emphasize her endurance of spousal abuse, charitable activities, and reported miracles.

=== Type of saint ===
The life of St. Thomaїs is frequently compared with that of Saint Mary the Younger (c. 800 CE), both of which are Byzantine woman saints whose sanctity diverges from that of their predecessors: predominantly nuns and ascetics. Instead, the Lives of Thomaїs and Mary as married laywomen are rare, promoting the "sanctification of relatively ordinary married women […] outside of the confines of a hermitage or convent."

=== Endurance of domestic abuse ===
Paul Halsall argues that Thomaїs's pious acts of charity alone are not extraordinary enough to account for her sainthood. Rather it is her endurance of domestic violence which underpins her sanctity as well as her legacy as a martyr. Moreover, he suggests that the saint's overall resistance to marriage and her childlessness shows "a continuing conflict between the ideals of domesticity and the ideals of sanctity" in Byzantine society.

Domestic violence in the lives of saints was not necessarily new in this period. As well as Saint Mary the Younger, comparisons have been made to the Life of Saint Matrona of Perge (c. 400 CE), whose husband, Dometianos, was also abusive in response to her charitable acts outside of the home; he thought these were a smokescreen for illicit sex. Matrona, however, fled and joined a monastic community, living as a monk under the name Babylas. The lives of Thomaїs and Mary as victims of domestic abuse have also been compared to a contemporaneous life of the male saint, Philaretos the Merciful (c. 800 CE), who was verbally abused by his wife as a result of his pious charity, which she perceived as a detriment to their household.

=== Cult ===
A significant cult of St. Thomaїs never developed, she was not included in the Synaxarion of Constantinople, nor is there evidence of any iconography. However, Talbot has suggested that there was a local cult among ordinary women, because the saint was more imitable as a married laywoman. Moreover, it is possible that her cult garnered more attention in the late-Byzantine period, around c.1300 CE, due to new versions of the life appearing, and the existence of a well preserved manuscript from that period, which contains both versions of her Vita.

=== Renewed interest ===
In the 14th century, the Palaiologan period, there was a renewed interest in the life of St. Thomaїs, with three new hagiographical works.

- Enkomion of St. Thomaїs, written by an anonymous author, who claims that his headache was cured at the saint's tomb.
- Constantine Akropolites, who died in c.1324 CE, wrote a new version of the Life.
- A metrical Synaxarion which recounts, in verse rather than prose, Thomaїs's life. It includes her endurance of domestic abuse and the same basic facts and events from her life that can be found in her earlier hagiographies.

=== Present-day ===
Saint Thomaїs of Lesbos is venerated in the Eastern Orthodox Church to this day. Her feast day is celebrated on 3 January. Thomaїs is considered a "Patron Saint of Marriage."

== Hagiographical texts ==
Four hagiographical works on the life of Saint Thomaїs of Lesbos have been catalogued in the Bibliotheca Hagiographica Graeca (BHG). The earliest attested version of the Life – BHG 2454 – is considered the primary vita and is estimated to have been composed around the mid-10th century. The other three, BHG 2455-57, are later versions, composed in the 14th century.

=== Editions ===
BHG 2454 - "Vita S. Thomaidis." Hippolyte Delehaye (ed.). In Acta Sanctorum Novembris. 4. Societe des Bollandistes. 1925: pp. 234–242.

BHG 2455 - "Vita S. Thomaidis." in Halkin, François (ed.). Hagiologie byzantine: textes inedits publies en grec et traduits en francais. Subsidia Hagiographica no. 71. Société des Bollandistes. 1986: pp. 185–219.

BHG 2456 - "Ἡ ἁγία Θωμαῒς ἡ Λεσβία." Phountoulis, Ioannis. M. (ed.). Poimen. 27.1962: pp. 8–10.

BHG 2457 - Akropolites, Constantine, "Laudatio S. Thomaidis". Delehaye, Hippolyte (ed.). In Acta Sanctorum Novembris. 4. Societe des Bollandistes. 1925: pp. 242–246.

== Bibliography ==
=== Primary sources ===
- Halsall, Paul (1996). "Life of St. Thomaїs of Lesbos". in Alice-Mary Talbot (ed.). Holy Women of Byzantium: Ten Saints' Lives in English Translation. Dumbarton Oaks, pp. 291–322. ISBN 978-0-88402-241-1. Retrieved 4 September 2026.

=== Secondary sources ===
- Constantinou, Stavroula (2014). "Performing Gender in Lay Saints Lives". Byzantine and Modem Greek Studies. 38 (1): 24–32 doi:10.1179/0307013113Z.00000000034. ISSN 0307-0131. Retrieved 4 September 2026.
- Efthymiadis, Stephanos (2014). "Hagiography from the 'Dark Age' to the Age of Symeon Metaphrastes (Eighth–Tenth Centuries)". In Efthymiadis, Stephanos (ed.). The Ashgate Research Companion to Byzantine Hagiography: Volume I: Periods and Places. Routledge. pp. 95–142. doi:10.4324/9781315612799. ISBN 978-1-317-04396-6.
- Efthymiadis, Stephanos (2014). "Greek Byzantine Hagiography in Verse". In Efthymiadis, Stephanos (ed.). The Ashgate Research Companion to Byzantine Hagiography: Volume II: Genres and Contexts. Routledge. pp. 161–180. doi:10.4324/9781315141909. ISBN 978-1-315-14190-9.
- Featherston, Jeffrey and Mango, Cyril. "Life of St. Matrona of Perge". in Alice-Mary Talbot (ed.). Holy Women of Byzantium: Ten Saints' Lives in English Translation. Dumbarton Oaks, pp. 13–64. ISBN 978-0-88402-241-1. Retrieved 8 September 2026.
- Garland, Lynda (2006). "Street-life in Constantinople: Women and the Carnivalesque". in Garland, Lynda (ed.). Byzantine Women: Varieties of Experience 800–1200. Routledge. pp.163-213. ISBN 978-1-351-95371-9. Retrieved 4 September 2026.
- "January 3, 2018. + Orthodox Calendar". orthochristian.com. Retrieved 2026-09-16.
- "January 3. Search for a Saint or Feast". Greek Orthodox Archdiocese of America. https://www.goarch.org/. Archived from the original on 2023-02-05. Retrieved 2026-09-16.
- Kazhdan, Alexander (1991). "Thomais of Lesbos". The Oxford Dictionary Of Byzantium. 3 Volumes. Oxford University Press. p. 2076. ISBN 978-0-19-504652-6. Retrieved 10 September 2026.
- "Pinakes | Πίνακες - Notice : Thomais Lesbia matrona CP". pinakes.irht.cnrs.fr. Retrieved 2026-09-17.
- "Saint Thomaïs of Lesvos, Patron Saint of Marriage". Orthodox Christianity Then and Now. https://www.johnsanidopoulos.com/ Retrieved 2026-09-17.
- "Saints and Feasts of January 3". Orthodox Christianity Then and Now. https://www.johnsanidopoulos.com/. Retrieved 2026-09-16.
- Talbot, Alice-Mary (2001). Women and Religious Life in Byzantium. Routledge. ISBN 978-1-040-24579-8.
- Talbot, Alice-Mary (2016). "Hagiography in Late Byzantium (1204–1453)". In Efthymiadis, Stephanos (ed.). The Ashgate Research Companion to Byzantine Hagiography: Volume I: Periods and Places. Routledge. pp. 173–198. doi:10.4324/9781315612799. ISBN 978-1-317-04396-6.
