= Jiajak Jaqeli =

Empress consort of Trebizond from c. 1300 to 1330

Jiajak Jaqeli (Georgian: ჯიაჯაყ ჯაყელი) (sometimes given as Djiadjak) was a Georgian princess and the Empress consort of Alexios II of Trebizond. Her name is a Georgian translation of the Turkic name Čeček, meaning flower.

== Family ==
Jiajak was a daughter of Beka I, the Jaqeli atabeg of Samtskhe. The Jaqelis held the Georgian feudal office of Eristavi, which could be "governor of a region" or an "army-commander", roughly equivalent to the Byzantine strategos and normally translated into English as "duke".

== Marriage ==
The marriage of Jiajak to Alexios II can be estimated to c. 1300. The Byzantine Emperor Andronikos II Palaiologos had been his guardian and wanted Alexios to marry a daughter of the high court official Nikephoros Choumnos, but, without asking for the permission, the young man instead married jiajak Jaqeli. Andronikos appealed to the Church to annul the marriage but the Patriarch refused to assist him, on the ground that Jiajak was reported to be already pregnant. Alexios' mother Eudokia Palaiologina, who returned to Trebizond on the pretext of inducing her son to dissolve the marriage, advised him to keep his Iberian wife.

The duration of their marriage remains uncertain. Alexios died in 1330 but there is no report when Jiajak died. The Dictionnaire historique et Généalogique des grandes familles de Grèce, d'Albanie et de Constantinople (1983) by Mihail-Dimitri Sturdza considers her to be only the first of two wives, the second one being Jigda, the only daughter of Demetre II of Georgia and his second wife Solghar, a Mongol. Demetre II practiced polygamy and had three known wives at the same time. While a daughter is reported in the "Georgian Chronicles", the Chronicle does not mention her being married. However older works such as the Europäische Stammtafeln: Stammtafeln zur Geschichte der Europäischen Staaten (1978) by Detlev Schwennicke do not mention any second marriage for Alexios II. As a result, Sturdza's theory is not universally accepted.

== Issue ==
Djiadjak and Alexios had at least six children:

1. Andronikos III, Emperor of Trebizond 1330-1332.
2. Basil, Emperor of Trebizond 1332-1340.
3. Michael Anachoutlou, murdered by his brother Andronikos III in 1330.
4. George Achpougas, murdered by his brother Andronikos III in 1330.
5. Anna Anachoutlou, a nun, became Empress of Trebizond 1341-1342.
6. Eudokia, despoina of Sinope, so named for having married the Emir of that city.

Royal titles
Preceded by Eudokia Palaiologina	Empress consort of Trebizond c. 1300–1330	Succeeded by Irene Palaiologina of Trebizond
