= John de lo Cavo =

Genoese pirate captain

John de lo Cavo or de Capite (Italian: Giovanni de lo Cavo) was a Genoese pirate captain who entered the service of the Byzantine emperor Michael VIII Palaiologos and became lord of Anafi and Rhodes and megas doux of the Byzantine navy.

John de lo Cavo was a native of the small Aegean island of Anafi, but originated, like many of the corsairs in the employ of Michael VIII Palaiologos, from Genoa. His favourite hunting grounds were the seas around Euboea, although he is known to have extended his activities up to the Albanian coast and the region of Valona.

Michael VIII launched a major effort to recover as many Aegean islands as possible from Latin rule, spearheaded by the megas doux Alexios Doukas Philanthropenos and another Italian renegade, Licario. De lo Cavo assisted by capturing his own native island, Anafi, from the Foscolo family that had held it. Michael VIII rewarded de lo Cavo with the lordship not only of Anafi, but also of Rhodes in ca. 1278, and was later raised, like Licario before him, to the rank of megas doux.

== Sources ==
- Geanakoplos, Deno John (1959). Emperor Michael Palaeologus and the West, 1258–1282: A Study in Byzantine-Latin Relations. Cambridge, Massachusetts: Harvard University Press. OCLC 1011763434.
- Miller, William (1908). The Latins in the Levant: A History of Frankish Greece (1204–1566). London: John Murray. OCLC 563022439.
- Nicol, Donald M. (1988). Byzantium and Venice: A Study in Diplomatic and Cultural Relations. Cambridge: Cambridge University Press. ISBN 0-521-34157-4.
