= Foscolo (noble family) =

- Venetian noble family
- Current region: Republic of Venice
- Origin: Venice

The Foscolo family is a Venetian noble family whose documented history is closely associated with the Republic of Venice. Historically part of the Republic's hereditary patriciate, the family produced military commanders, diplomats, magistrates, colonial officials, and men of letters. Following the fall of the Republic in 1797, the exclusive political rights of the Venetian patriciate ceased. Distinct branches of the family later received formal recognition within the Austrian nobility and, following the unification of Italy, the nobility of the Kingdom of Italy.

== Early history ==
Early modern genealogies link the Foscolo family with the Roman cognomen Fuscus, aligning with a broader cultural tradition of connecting Venetian patrician lineages to Imperial Rome. The name is derived from the Latin fuscus ("dark" or "swarthy"). These genealogies traced the family’s origins to Hugo Fuscus, or Ugo Fosco, who was said to have been dispatched by the Paduans as one of three consuls to oversee the construction of the Rialto in 963 and 964. Although this tradition forms part of the family's historiographical identity, its documented presence in Venice dates to a later period.

Members of the Foscolo family appear in the historical record among the governing elite of medieval Venice. In 1094, Domenico Foscolo was among the witnesses to a pact concerning Loredo, commonly called Loreo, under Doge Vitale Faliero. Pietro Foscolo witnessed a 1122 treaty between Venice and Bari. In 1151, a member of the family, recorded as Marino or Marco Foscolo, appears among the 249 nobles who endorsed a civic charter connected with the financing of St Mark's Campanile.

Throughout the 13th century, the family consolidated its position within the Republic's commercial and political institutions. This position was confirmed after the 1297 Serrata del Maggior Consiglio, which formalised the hereditary character of the Venetian patriciate. Within the hierarchy of Venetian nobility, the family was classified among the case nuove (new houses), distinct from the older houses case vecchie and the very new houses case novissime ennobled after the War of Chioggia.

== Medieval branches ==
The Venetian expansion into the eastern Mediterranean following the Fourth Crusade led to the establishment of several medieval branches of the Foscolo family. One line became established on the island of Anafi in the Cyclades. Following the conquest of the archipelago by Marco I Sanudo in the early 13th century, Anafi was granted as a feudal lordship to Leonardo Foscolo, one of Sanudo's companions and military commanders. The Foscolo lordship on Anafi was later lost during the Byzantine recovery of the Aegean islands, when the Genoese privateer John de lo Cavo, acting under Michael VIII Palaiologos, freed the island from Foscolo control.

Other members of the Foscolo family established themselves in Venetian Crete (the Kingdom of Candia) as military colonists. In 1211, the brothers Leonardo and Giovanni Foscolo of Santa Croce were among the first wave of colonists to settle the island. Leonardo served as a regional captain and participated in the distribution and administration of local colonial fiefs. During a Cretan uprising led by Giorgio and Teodoro Cortazzi, two Foscolo members were killed in action while serving under the Venetian commander Marino Zeno.

Over the centuries, the Candian branches became increasingly embedded in local Cretan society. Later genealogical accounts described some lines as having neglected their original nobiliary status while continuing to live civilly. Because members of these branches were no longer continuously enrolled in the Venetian Libro d'Oro, later generations were generally not regarded as being part of the Venetian patriciate, despite preserving local noble standing in Crete.

A prominent figure from this Hellenised Cretan line was the dramatist Markos Antonios Foskolos (1597–1662), whose Greek-language comedy Fortounatos (1655) is regarded as one of the principal works of the Cretan Renaissance. Following the Ottoman conquest of Candia in 1669 after the Siege of Candia, branches of these Cretan feudatories relocated to the Venetian-controlled Ionian Islands, establishing a presence in Corfu and Zante.

== Patrician branches and continuations ==
=== Metropolitan patrician branches ===
The principal metropolitan branches of the Foscolo family within the Venetian patriciate included the San Vio and San Polo lines, which produced military commanders, diplomats, magistrates, and colonial officials for the Republic of Venice. The primary San Vio line was associated with the parish of San Vio in Dorsoduro and is traditionally traced to Almorò Foscolo di Andrea (c. 1260 – c. 1310), whose descendants were incorporated into the hereditary patriciate following the Serrata del Maggior Consiglio of 1297.

In the fifteenth century, a branch of the family settled near the Frari in the sestiere of San Polo, establishing the San Polo stem. During the sixteenth century, the San Polo line gave rise to two metropolitan branches. One branch, headed by Francesco Foscolo di Marco, was associated with San Vio and produced ecclesiastical, judicial, and administrative figures. The other branch, headed by Zaccaria Foscolo di Marco, produced military figures, including the Venetian commander Leonardo Foscolo (1588–1660), who served as Captain General of the Venetian fleet during the Cretan War. In the later years of the Republic, the line continuing through Francesco Foscolo di Alvise, a brother of General Leonardo Foscolo, settled in San Stefano.

=== Later continuations ===
After the fall of the Republic in 1797, Venetian patrician status ceased to carry political privileges. Several branches of the family nevertheless continued to be recognised in later Austrian and Italian nobiliary records. Under Austrian rule in the Kingdom of Lombardy–Venetia, members of the Foscolo family—specifically the San Vio branch represented by the line of Daulo Augusto Foscolo di Marco (b. 1722)—were confirmed in the Habsburg nobiliary system as Nobile. The traditional styles continued as Nobil Homo or N.H. for men and Nobil Donna or N.D. for women.

Following the unification of the Kingdom of Italy, nobiliary status and titles were recorded by branch in Italian nobiliary sources. The continuations of the San Vio line resident in Venice, Treviso, and Oderzo—represented by Alessandro di Daulo Augusto (b. 25 June 1758) and his brothers Marco (b. 26 May 1757) and Leonardo (b. 13 July 1765)—were recorded with the status of Nobile. The San Polo–San Stefano continuation, resident in Ferrara and Venice, which had separated from the patriciate in the eighteenth century, was recorded as Nobile through Francesco Foscolo di Leonardo (b. 1693) and all his legitimate descendants. Across these recognised lines, male members retained the traditional style of Nobil Homo and females Nobil Donna.

Additionally, a continuation of the San Vio branch resident in Turin is associated with Giorgio Foscolo di Daulo Augusto (1762–1822). In later Italian nobiliary sources, this branch was recorded with the title of Patrizio veneto alongside the title of Conte, granted by royal decree of 14 July 1895 and followed by royal letters patent of 29 December 1895, transmissible to legitimate and natural male descendants in the male line. For this branch, male members were styled Conte, while the legal spouse of the title-holder was styled Contessa by marital usage.

The family also established Oltremare (overseas) branches connected to the Ionian Islands and the Eastern Mediterranean. Genealogical sources trace the Oltremare Ionian–Zante branch to Nicolò Foscolo, brother of Leonardo Foscolo, who settled in the Venetian Ionian possessions. This branch is best known for producing the poet Ugo Foscolo (1778–1827). The Ionian–Zante line connected with Ugo Foscolo is treated in biographical sources separately from the branches later recorded in Austrian and Italian nobiliary repertories.

A later Oltremare Levantine continuation of the Foscolo family is documented in Smyrna and Constantinople. Published research identifies this line as part of the Venetian aristocratic Foscolo family and documents it in the Ottoman Levant as a Venetian-origin line under Austrian protection and nationality, and later Italian nationality and consular protection. Paolo Foscolo di Nicolò (1840–1918), a member of the Smyrna line, was associated with a large family estate at Sevdikioi, near Smyrna, which local histories describe as a venue for social and diplomatic gatherings in the late Ottoman era. Following the destruction of Smyrna in 1922, surviving members of this line, including Paolo's sons Nicolò and Michele, relocated to Athens, Greece. A published Greek account records the Smyrna line as having received Italian papers recognising Italian citizenship, Venetian origin, and a hereditary Italian nobiliary title; related Italian consular and nobiliary records associate the Smyrna line with the comital continuation of the family and identify the title as Conte, with the corresponding style Contessa. The Constantinople maritime line was associated with Foscolo & Mango Shipping Company. This Levantine maritime and commercial enterprise operated shipping, coal-agency, and brokerage networks connecting Constantinople and the Danubian ports with the Mediterranean, Black Sea, northern Europe, and Atlantic-linked commercial routes.

== Heraldry ==
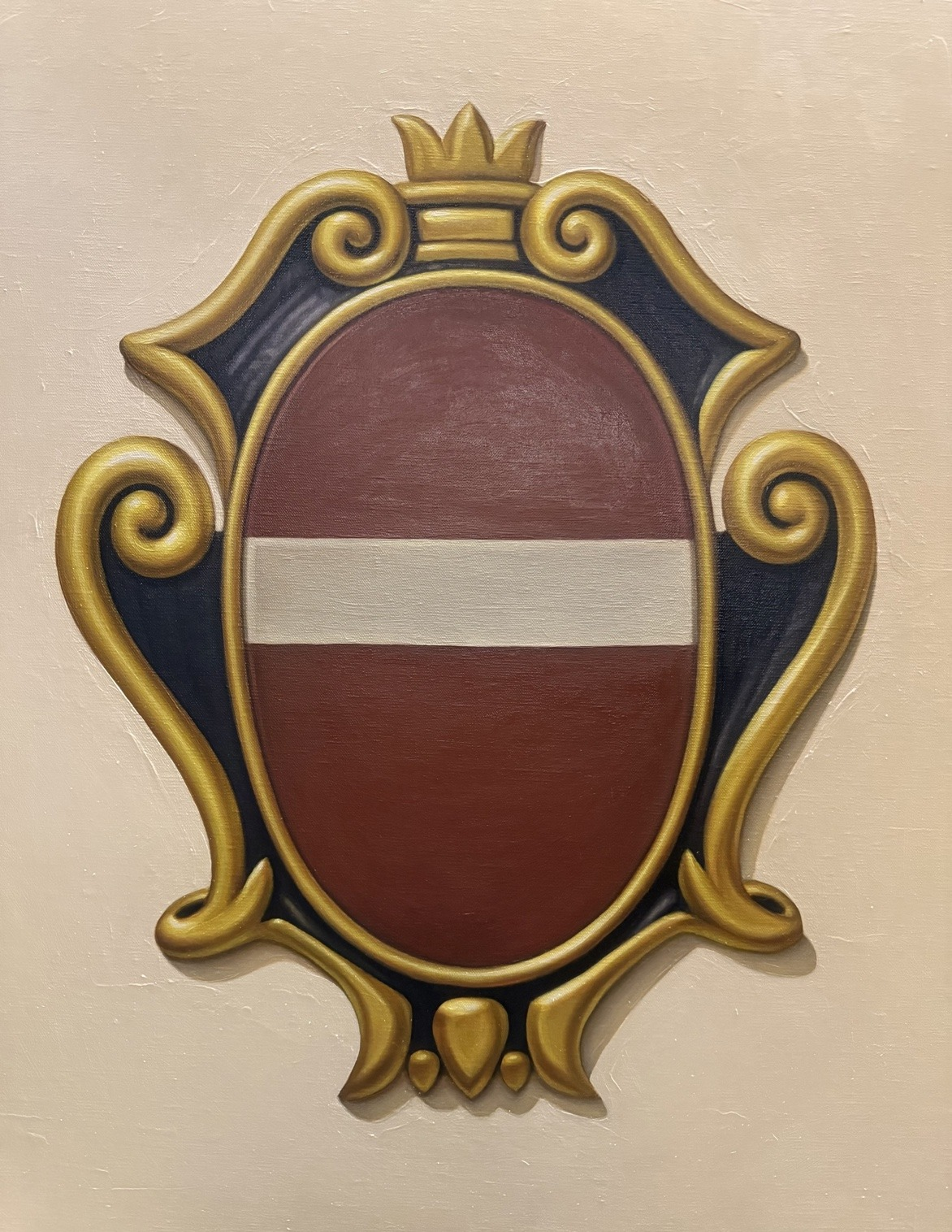
The arms recorded for the Foscolo family.

The arms recorded for the Foscolo family in the Italian nobiliary repertory are red with a silver horizontal band. Blazoned as: Gules, a fess Argent.

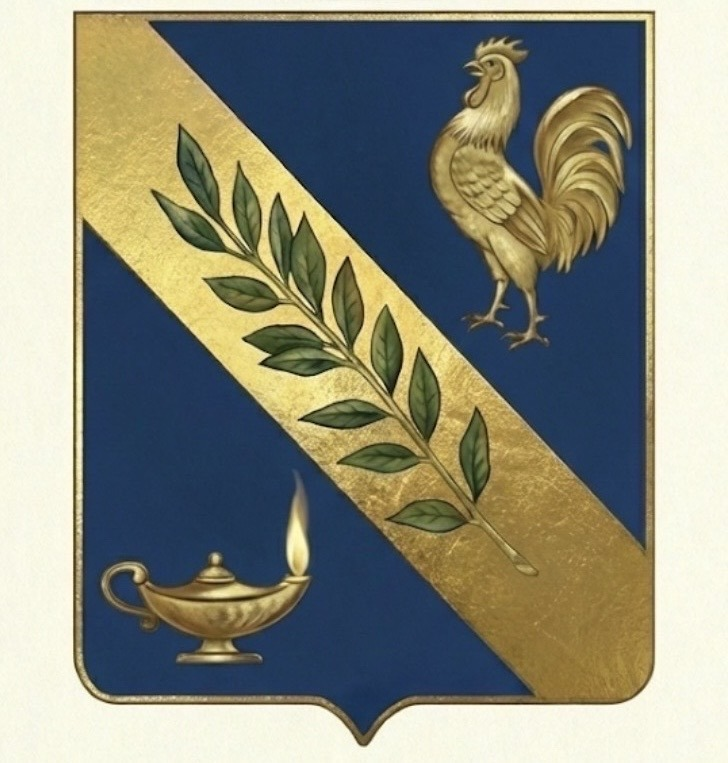
Blue-and-gold armorial form associated with the Smyrna line.

The Smyrna line is associated with a blue-and-gold branch armorial form corresponding to the Foscolo di Venezia arms recorded in armorial sources. This form features a blue shield with a gold diagonal band carrying a green laurel branch, accompanied by a golden cock above and a lit golden lamp below. This form is blazoned as: Azure, on a bend Or a laurel branch Vert; in chief a cock Or, and in base a lamp enflamed Or.

== Notable members ==
- Leonardo Foscolo, 17th-century Venetian commander
- Nikolaos Foskolos (born 1937), Roman Catholic Archbishop of Athens
- Nikos Foskolos (1927–2013), Greek screenwriter and director
- Ugo Foscolo (1778–1827), Italian writer, poet and revolutionary
