= Daphnus (Bithynia) =

Town of ancient Bithynia

Coordinates: 40°10′18″N 28°35′20″E

Daphnus or Daphnous (Ancient Greek: Δαφνοῦς) was a town of ancient Bithynia, situated upon an island in a lake called Daphnusis near the Mysian Olympus. The lake Daphnusis is identified as that called Miletopolitis by other authors. The cult site, Apollon Daphnousios, which is near to the Akçapınar District of Nilüfer/Bursa may be related to this town. (The Katoikia of Daphnous and the Sanctuary of Apollon Daphnousios in the Territory of Apollonia ad Rhyndacum, Epigraphica Anatolica 21(1993):99-105). Another possible relationship can be established with the city of Daphnousiae, which is mentioned in the Notitiae Episcopatuum 3 and whose location is unknown.

Its site is located in Asiatic Turkey.
