= Manuel II of Trebizond =

Manuel II Megas Komnenos
- Emperor and Autocrat of all the East, of the Iberians and of Perateia
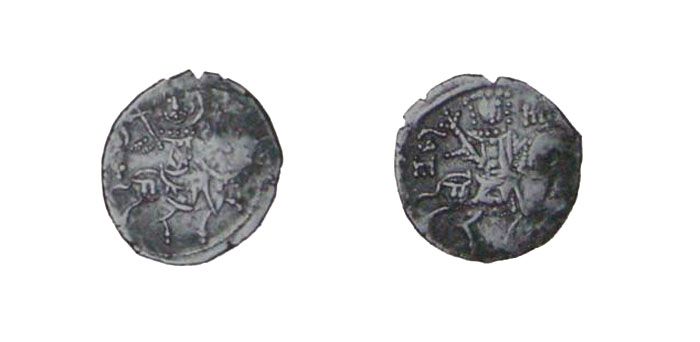
- Coins of Manuel II Megas Comenos

Emperor of Trebizond
- Reign: 8 January 1332 – September 1332
- Predecessor: Andronikos III
- Successor: Basil
- Born: c. 1324
- Died: 1333 (aged 8–9)
- Dynasty: Komnenos
- Father: Andronikos III Megas Komnenos

Manuel II Megas Komnenos (Greek: Μανουὴλ Μέγας Κομνηνός, Manouēl Megas Komnēnos; c. 1324 – 1333) was Emperor of Trebizond for eight months in 1332. Manuel was the son of Emperor Andronikos III, whom he succeeded at the age of eight in January 1332.

== Biography ==
The primary source for Manuel's reign, the chronicle of Michael Panaretos, strikingly omits many facts about Manuel or his reign, despite that both occurred during living memory of Panaretos' writing. No information is provided about his mother, who conceivably could have acted as regent, nor even if there was a regency. All Panaretos tells us about his short reign is that Bayram Beg, the Emir of Chalybia, invaded Manuel's territory with his Turkmen, penetrating as far as Asomatos, where the Trapezuntine army defeated them on 30 August 1332, inflicting many casualties and capturing many of their horses.

According to William Miller, the crimes of his father had shocked the people to such a point that they had divided into rival factions: one based on the capital, which he describes as "the Byzantine party"; the other on the countryside, which he describes as "representing the original Pontic aristocracy". The Byzantine party invited Manuel's uncle Basil to return to Trebizond from Constantinople and to take over the government. Basil reached Trebizond 22 September 1332; Manuel was deposed after a reign of eight months and imprisoned. The megas doux Lekes Tzatzintaion, his wife Syrikaina, and their son Tzambas, the megas domestikos, who were presumably Manuel's supporters, were executed. However, an unsuccessful revolt led by the megas doux John in February 1333 prompted his uncle Basil to order Manuel's execution.

Manuel's execution was unusual for many reasons. Of the four Emperors deposed during the existence of the Empire of Trebizond, Manuel was the only one to be killed after being removed from power; in the other three cases, it was sufficient that the former ruler be exiled. Further, during the existence of the Byzantine Empire execution of underage rivals for the Imperial throne was rare; even the ruthless Michael VIII Palaiologos was satisfied with merely blinding the deposed and imprisoned John IV Laskaris, who was about Manuel's age. That Manuel's father Andronikos III killed Manuel's two uncles may have influenced Basil's decision to order Manuel's death.

Manuel II of Trebizond Komnenid dynasty Born: c. 1324 Died: 1333
Regnal titles
Preceded by Andronikos III	Emperor of Trebizond; 1332	Succeeded by Basil
