= Andronikos III of Trebizond =

Andronikos III Megas Komnenos
- Emperor and Autocrat of all the East, of the Iberians and of Perateia
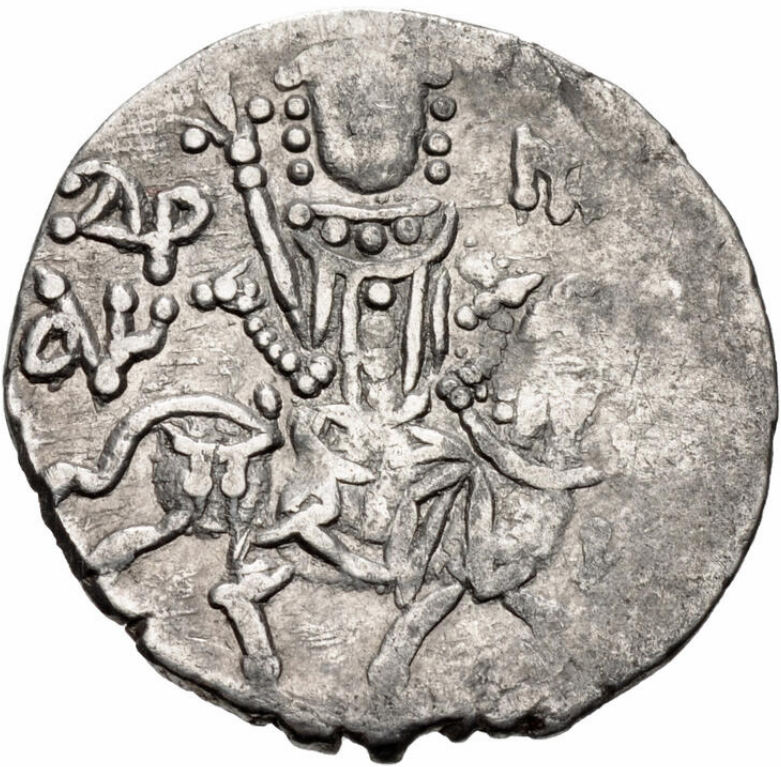
- Coin depicting Andronikos III Megas Komnenos mounted on a horse

Emperor of Trebizond
- Reign: October 1330 – 8 January 1332
- Predecessor: Alexios II
- Successor: Manuel II
- Died: 8 January 1332
- Issue: Manuel II Megas Komnenos
- Dynasty: Komnenos
- Father: Alexios II Megas Komnenos
- Mother: Djiadjak Jaqeli

Andronikos III Megas Komnenos, or Andronicus III (Greek: Ανδρόνικος Μέγας Κομνηνός, romanized: Andronikos Megas Komnēnos), (died 8 January 1332) was Emperor of Trebizond from 1330 to 1332. He was the eldest son of Emperor Alexios II of Trebizond and his Iberian wife, Djiadjak Jaqeli of Samckhe. According to Michael Panaretos, he reigned for 15 months, which suggests that there was an interregnum of five months — from the death of his father in May to October 1330.

Rustam Shukurov suggested that Andronikos and his son Manuel were named for their distant ancestors, Andronikos I Komnenos and his son Manuel the Sebastokrator, arguing that their portraits appeared on the walls of the Imperial palace hall.

One of his first actions when Andronikos became emperor was to put to death his two younger brothers, George Azachoutlou and Michael Achpougas. His other brother Basil managed to escape to Constantinople, where his uncle Michael was probably already residing.

On January 8, 1332, he died of bubonic plague like his father.

Upon his death Andronikos was briefly succeeded by his son, Manuel II. The sources have preserved no other details on the circumstances of Andronikos' short reign.

Andronikos III of Trebizond Komnenid dynasty Born: c. 1310 Died: 1332
Regnal titles
Preceded by Alexios II	Emperor of Trebizond; 1330–1332	Succeeded by Manuel II
