= John the Eunuch (Trebizond) =

John the Eunuch (Greek: Ιωάννης Ευνούχος) was a dignitary of the Empire of Trebizond who lived during the first half of the 14th century. There is no evidence in the sources regarding his descent, but apparently he did not belong to any notable aristocratic family. It is more likely that he rose thanks to his competence. He bore the high title of megas doux which meant that he was commander of the naval forces of Trebizond. He lived in Limnia, a town on the coast of the Black Sea, which was a naval base. John played an important role in the internal affairs of the Empire of Trebizond until his assassination in March 1344.

== Life ==
The megas doux John is first mentioned in connection to the rise to the throne of Basil Grand Komnenos (r. 1332–1340), following the brief reigns of Andronikos III (r. 1332) and Manuel II (r. January – September 1332). The new emperor had Byzantine support and the support of some pro-Byzantine dignitaries. The measures he took shortly after his ascension against the local aristocracy of non-Greek descent are characteristic, while shortly afterwards Basil married Irene Palaiologina, the illegitimate daughter of the Byzantine Emperor Andronikos III Palaiologos. According to information related by Michael Panaretos, on 21 February 1333 the megas doux John participated in the events during which the recently deposed emperor Manuel II was murdered. A few years later the eunuch John was involved in the Trapezuntine Civil War, supporting Irene Palaiologina.

== Sources ==
- Radic, Radivoj (2003). "John Eunuch". Encyclopaedia of the Hellenic World, Asia Minor. Foundation of the Hellenic World.
