= Megas doux =

Title for the commander-in-chief of the Byzantine Navy

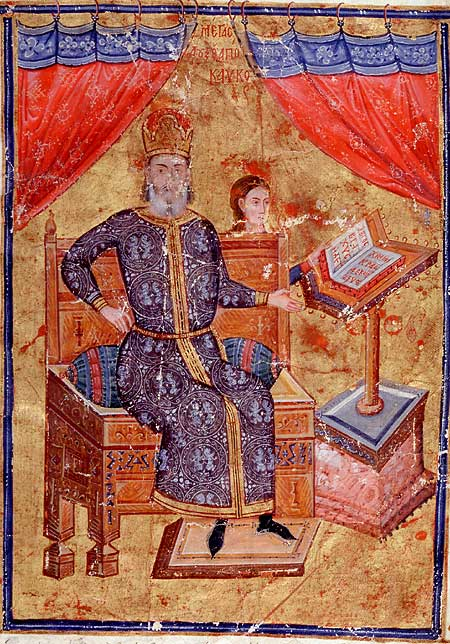
The megas doux Alexios Apokaukos in the garb of his office

The megas doux (Greek: μέγας δούξ, pronounced [ˈmeɣaz ˈðuks], "grand duke") was one of the highest positions in the hierarchy of the later Byzantine Empire, denoting the commander-in-chief of the Byzantine navy. It is sometimes also given in English by the half-Latinizations megaduke or megadux. The Greek word δούξ is the Hellenized form of the Latin term dux, meaning leader or commander.

== History and functions ==
The office was initially created by Alexios I Komnenos (r. 1081–1118), who reformed the derelict Byzantine navy and amalgamated the remnants of its various provincial squadrons into a unified force under the megas doux. The Emperor's brother-in-law John Doukas is usually considered to have been the first to hold the title, being raised to it in 1092, when he was tasked with suppressing the Turkish emir Tzachas. There is however a document dated to December 1085, where a monk Niketas signs as supervisor of the estates of an unnamed megas doux. The office of "doux [commander] of the fleet" (δούξ τοῦ στόλου, doux tou stolou), with similar responsibilities and hence perhaps a precursor of the office of megas doux, is also mentioned at the time, being given c. 1086 to Manuel Boutoumites and in 1090 to Constantine Dalassenos.

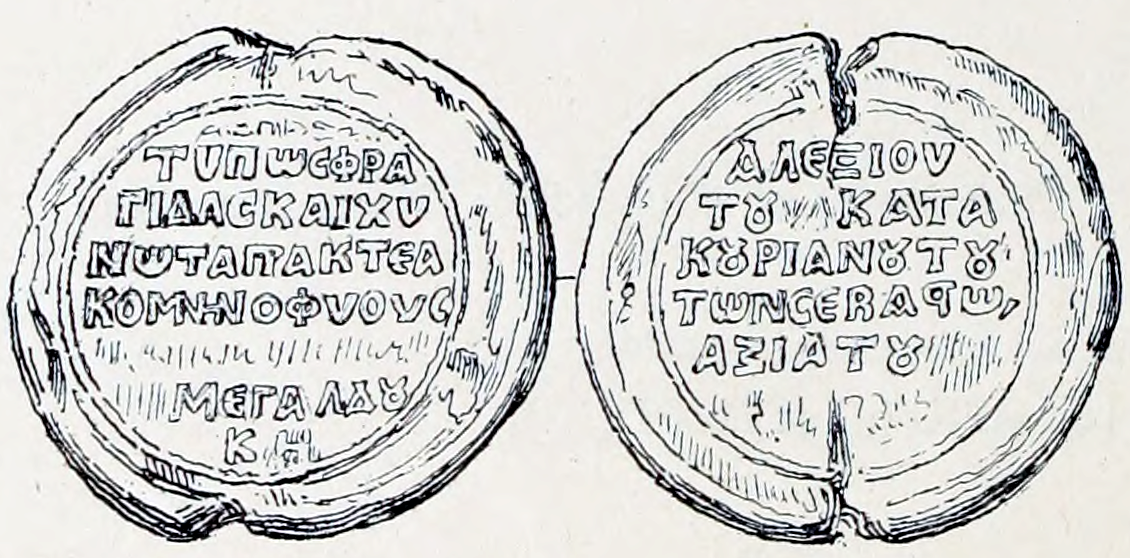
Seal of the sebastos, rhaiktor and megas doux Alexios Katakourianos, "born of the Komnenoi". He is known only from this seal.

Initially, the office may have designated ad hoc commanders-in-chief placed in charge of combined naval and land expeditions, before coming to denote the head of the imperial fleet. John Doukas, the first known megas doux, led campaigns on both land and sea and was responsible for the re-establishment of firm Byzantine control over the Aegean and the islands of Crete and Cyprus in the years 1092–93 and over western Anatolia in 1097. From this time the megas doux was also given overall control of the provinces of Hellas, the Peloponnese and Crete, which chiefly provided the manpower and resources for the fleet. However, since the megas doux was one of the Empire's senior officials, and mostly involved with the central government and various military campaigns, de factο governance of these provinces rested with the provinces' praitor or katepano, and various local leaders. During the 12th century, the post of megas doux was dominated by the Kontostephanos family; one of its members, Andronikos Kontostephanos, was one of the most important officers of Emperor Manuel I Komnenos (r. 1143–1180), assisting him in achieving many land and naval victories.

With the virtual disappearance of the Byzantine fleet after the Fourth Crusade, the title was retained as an honorific in the Empire of Nicaea. Michael VIII Palaiologos (r. 1259–1282) assumed the title when he became regent for John IV Laskaris (r. 1258–1261), before being raised to senior co-emperor. It was also used by the Latin Empire, where, in c. 1207, the Latin emperor awarded the island of Lemnos and the hereditary title of megadux to the Venetian (or possibly of mixed Greek and Venetian descent) Filocalo Navigajoso ("imperiali privilegio Imperii Megaducha est effectus"). His descendants inherited the title and the rule of Lemnos until evicted by the Byzantines in 1278.

After the Byzantine recovery of Constantinople in 1261, the title reverted to its old function as commander-in-chief of the navy, and remained a high rank for the remainder of the empire, its holder ranking sixth after the emperor, between the protovestiarios and the protostrator. As such, it was also sometimes conferred upon foreigners in imperial service, the most notable among these being the Italian Licario, who recovered many Aegean islands for Emperor Michael VIII, and Roger de Flor, head of the Catalan Company. The mid-14th century Book of Offices of Pseudo-Kodinos lists the insignia of the megas doux as a golden-red skiadion hat decorated with embroideries in the klapoton style, without veil. Alternatively, a domed skaranikon hat could be worn, again in red and gold and decorated with golden wire, with a portrait of the emperor standing in front, and another of him enthroned in the rear. The megas doux also wore a rich silk tunic, the kabbadion, and could choose the fabric himself "from those that are in use". His staff of office (dikanikion) featured carved knots and knobs in gold, bordered with silver braid. Pseudo-Kodinos also records that, while the other warships flew "the usual imperial flag" of the cross and the firesteels, the flagship of the megas doux flew an image of the emperor on horseback. His subordinate officials were the megas droungarios tou stolou, the ameralios, the protokomes, a number of junior droungarioi, and of junior kometes.

The Serbian Empire, established in 1346 by Tsar Stefan Dushan, adopted various Byzantine titles, among them that of megas doux, which became the "grand voivode" (veliki vojvoda), albeit without any naval connotations. Holders of the office included senior noblemen such as Jovan Uglješa and Jovan Oliver.

== List of known holders ==
=== Byzantine Empire ===
Name	Tenure	Appointed by	Notes	Refs
John Doukas	1092 – unknown	Alexios I Komnenos	Brother-in-law of Alexios I, previously governor of Dyrrhachium.	
Landulf	1099–1105	Alexios I Komnenos	Admiral of Western origin.	
Isaac Kontostephanos	1105–1108	Alexios I Komnenos	Dismissed for his incompetence in the wars against Bohemond.	
Marianos Maurokatakalon	1108 – unknown	Alexios I Komnenos	Successor of Isaac Konstostephanos.	
Eumathios Philokales	after 1112 – after 1118	Alexios I Komnenos	Previously judicial official in Greece and long-time governor of Cyprus.	
Constantine Opos	Unknown	Alexios I Komnenos	Distinguished general in the campaigns against the Turks.	
Leo Nikerites	Unknown	Alexios I Komnenos	Eunuch, previously governor in Bulgaria and the Peloponnese.	
Nikephoros Vatatzes	Unknown	Alexios I Komnenos (?)	Known only through a seal, possibly dating to the reign of Alexios I.	
Stephen Kontostephanos	ca. 1145 (?) – 1149	Manuel I Komnenos	Brother-in-law of Manuel I, was killed while in office in 1149.	
Alexios Komnenos	ca. 1155 – after 1161	Manuel I Komnenos	Son of Anna Komnene and Nikephoros Bryennios the Younger.	
Andronikos Kontostephanos	after 1161 – 1182	Manuel I Komnenos	Manuel's nephew, he was the emperor's most trusted and distinguished general. Blinded by the usurper Andronikos I Komnenos in 1182.	
John Komnenos	Unknown	Manuel I Komnenos	First cousin of Manuel I, son of the sebastokrator Andronikos Komnenos. He fell at Myriokephalon in 1176.	
Constantine Angelos Doukas	Unknown	Isaac II Angelos	doux tou stolou and afterwards governor of Philippopolis, he led an unsuccessful usurpation attempt.	
Michael Stryphnos	ca. 1195 – after 1201/1202	Alexios III Angelos	A favourite of Alexios III. He reportedly sold off the fleet's equipment to enrich himself.	
Theodotos Phokas	ca. 1210	Theodore I Laskaris	Uncle of Theodore I, emperor of Nicaea, known only from a monastic property deed dating to between 1206 and 1212.	
John Gabalas	ca. 1240	John III Vatatzes	A letter by King Henry I of Cyprus to the anonymous "great ruler of the God-guarded island of Rhodes and the Cyclades", identified by Spyridon Lambros with John, refers to him as pansebastos sebastos, megas doux, and gambros of the emperor.	
Michael Palaiologos	1258	John IV Laskaris	The future Michael VIII, he assumed the office after the murder of George Mouzalon in September 1258, when he was named regent for the young John IV. He was soon after raised to despotes and eventually to emperor.	
Michael Tzamantouros Laskaris	1259 – ca. 1269/72	Michael VIII Palaiologos	Brother of Theodore I Laskaris, due to his advanced age he never held actual command of the fleet. He held the office until his death.	
Alexios Doukas Philanthropenos	ca. 1272/73 – ca. 1274/75	Michael VIII Palaiologos	Previously protostrator and de facto commander of the fleet since ca. 1263. Held the office of megas doux until his death.	
Licario	ca. 1275/77 – unknown	Michael VIII Palaiologos	Italian renegade who entered Byzantine service, he conquered Negroponte and many of the Aegean islands.	
John de lo Cavo	after 1278	Michael VIII Palaiologos	Genoese privateer who entered Byzantine service, lord of Anafi and Rhodes.	
Roger de Flor	1303–1304	Andronikos II Palaiologos	Leader of the mercenary Catalan Company. He resigned his post in late 1304 favour of his lieutenant, Berenguer d'Entença, and was murdered a few months later.	
Berenguer d'Entença	1304–1305	Andronikos II Palaiologos	Roger de Flor's lieutenant and successor as leader of the mercenary Catalan Company. He resigned his office after disagreeing with the emperor	
Fernand Ximenes de Arenos	1307/1308 – unknown	Andronikos II Palaiologos	One of the leaders of the Catalan Company, he was named megas doux defected to the Byzantines	
Syrgiannes Palaiologos	1321–1322 or 1328/29	Andronikos II Palaiologos	One of the main partisans of the young Andronikos III Palaiologos in the Byzantine civil war of 1321–1328, he defected to the aged Andronikos II, who rewarded him with the office of megas doux. After plotting against him as well, he was imprisoned.	
Isaac Palaiologos Asanes	unknown – 1341	Andronikos III Palaiologos	Promoted to panhypersebastos, and replaced in office by Alexios Apokaukos.	
Alexios Apokaukos	1341–1345	Andronikos III Palaiologos; John V Palaiologos	A former partisan and protégé of John Kantakouzenos, Apokaukos was instrumental in the outbreak of the Byzantine civil war of 1341–1347, and until his murder in 1345 led the anti-Kantakouzenist regency for John V	
Asomatianos Tzamplakon	1348–1349	John VI Kantakouzenos	Head of the fleet during the Byzantine–Genoese war of 1348–1349. He died some time before 1356	
[Paul?] Mamonas	after 1393/94 – before 1416/17	Manuel II Palaiologos	The Mamonas family were hereditary rulers of Monemvasia. [Paul] Mamonas ruled the city between 1384 and 1416/17	
Manuel	unknown – 1410	Manuel II Palaiologos	Mentioned only in an anonymous chronicle as dying of an epidemic in 1409/10	
[Manuel?] Phrangopoulos	ca. 1429	Theodore II Palaiologos	Promoted from prōtostratōr to megas doux of the Despotate of the Morea in 1429. Manuel Phrangopoulos was a senior official of the Despotate already since the 1390s.	
Paraspondelos	ca. 1436	John VIII Palaiologos	Known only as the father-in-law of Demetrios Palaiologos.	
Loukas Notaras	after 1441 – 1453	John VIII Palaiologos; Constantine XI Palaiologos	A wealthy merchant and landowner with estates in Italy, Notaras served as ship captain in 1441, and then under both John VIII and Constantine XI as chief minister (mesazōn). He was executed by the Ottomans after the Fall of Constantinople	

=== Empire of Trebizond ===
Name	Tenure	Appointed by	Notes	Refs
Lekes Tzatzintzaios	unknown–1332		Executed by Basil Megas Komnenos on his arrival to Trebizond.	
John	1332–1344	Basil Megas Komnenos; Irene Palaiologina	Eunuch and one of the leading participants in the Trapezuntine Civil War on the side of Empress Irene Palaiologina.	
Niketas Scholarios	1344–1345; 1349–1361	John III Megas Komnenos; Michael Megas Komnenos; Alexios III Megas Komnenos	One of the leading participants in the Trapezuntine Civil War, as a partisan of John III Megas Komnenos. Imprisoned by Michael Megas Komnenos in 1345, he was reinstated by Michael in 1349 and remained in office under Alexios III, probably until his death in 1361.	
John Kabazites	after 1344 – 1349	Michael Megas Komnenos	One of the leading participants in the Trapezuntine Civil War against Empress Irene Palaiologina. Killed fighting against the Genoese at Kaffa.	
Scholaris	ca. 1395		Otherwise unknown/unidentified.	

== Cultural references ==
In the 1490 Valencian epic romance Tirant lo Blanc, the valiant knight Tirant the White from Brittany travels to Constantinople and becomes a Byzantine megadux. This story has no basis in actual history, though it may reflect the above-mentioned cases of the office being conferred upon foreigners.

== Sources ==
- Angold, Michael (1997). The Byzantine Empire, 1025–1204: A Political History (Second ed.). London and New York: Longman. ISBN 0-582-29468-1.
- Bartusis, Mark C. (1997). The Late Byzantine Army: Arms and Society 1204–1453. University of Pennsylvania Press. ISBN 0-8122-1620-2.
- Geanakoplos, Deno John (1959). Emperor Michael Palaeologus and the West, 1258–1282: A Study in Byzantine-Latin Relations. Cambridge, Massachusetts: Harvard University Press. OCLC 1011763434.
- Guilland, Rodolphe (1967). "Le Drongaire de la flotte, le Grand drongaire de la flotte, le Duc de la flotte, le Mégaduc". Recherches sur les institutions byzantines [Studies on the Byzantine Institutions]. Berliner byzantinische Arbeiten 35 (in French). Vol. I. Berlin and Amsterdam: Akademie-Verlag & Adolf M. Hakkert. pp. 535–562. OCLC 878894516.
- Kazhdan, Alexander, ed. (1991). The Oxford Dictionary of Byzantium. Oxford and New York: Oxford University Press. ISBN 0-19-504652-8.
- Nicol, Donald M. (1988). Byzantium and Venice: A Study in Diplomatic and Cultural Relations. Cambridge: Cambridge University Press. ISBN 0-521-34157-4.
- Nicol, Donald M. (1993). The Last Centuries of Byzantium, 1261–1453 (Second ed.). Cambridge: Cambridge University Press. ISBN 978-0-521-43991-6.
- Magdalino, Paul (2002) [1993]. The Empire of Manuel I Komnenos, 1143–1180. Cambridge: Cambridge University Press. ISBN 0-521-52653-1.
- Oikonomidis, N. (1980). "Οι αυθένται των Κρητών το 1118" [The lords of the Cretans in 1118]. Πεπραγμένα του Δ' Διεθνούς Κρητολογικού Συνεδρίου, Ηράκλειο, 29 Αυγούστου - 3 Δεκεμβρίου 1976. Τόμος Β′ Βυζαντινοί και μέσοι χρόνοι (in Greek). Athens: University of Crete. pp. 308–317.
- Polemis, Demetrios I. (1968). The Doukai: A Contribution to Byzantine Prosopography. London: The Athlone Press. OCLC 299868377.
- Savvides, Alexis (1990). "Η γενουατική κατάληψη της Ρόδου το 1248–1250 μ.Χ.". Παρνασσός (in Greek). 32: 183–199.
- Skoulatos, Basile (1980). Les personnages byzantins de l'Alexiade: Analyse prosopographique et synthèse [The Byzantine Personalities of the Alexiad: Prosopographical Analysis and Synthesis] (in French). Louvain-la-Neuve and Louvain: Bureau du Recueil Collège Érasme and Éditions Nauwelaerts. OCLC 8468871.
- Trapp, Erich; Beyer, Hans-Veit; Walther, Rainer; Sturm-Schnabl, Katja; Kislinger, Ewald; Leontiadis, Ioannis; Kaplaneres, Sokrates (1976–1996). Prosopographisches Lexikon der Palaiologenzeit (in German). Vienna: Verlag der Österreichischen Akademie der Wissenschaften. ISBN 3-7001-3003-1.
- Van Tricht, Filip (2011). The Latin Renovatio of Byzantium: The Empire of Constantinople (1204–1228). Leiden: Brill. ISBN 978-90-04-20323-5.
- Verpeaux, Jean, ed. (1966). Pseudo-Kodinos, Traité des Offices (in French). Paris: Centre National de la Recherche Scientifique.
