= Alexios II of Trebizond =

Emperor of Trebizond from 1297 to 1330

Alexios II Megas Komnenos
- Emperor and Autocrat of all the East, of the Iberians and of Perateia
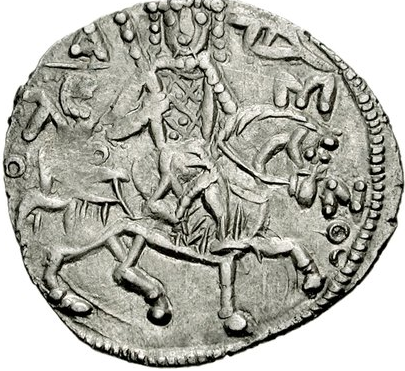
- Coin depicting Alexios II Megas Komnenos mounted on a horse

Emperor of Trebizond
- Reign: 16 August 1297 – 3 May 1330
- Predecessor: John II
- Successor: Andronikos III
- Born: 1282
- Died: 3 May 1330 (aged 47–48)
- Spouse: Djiadjak Jaqeli
- Issue: Andronikos III Megas Komnenos; Basil Megas Komnenos; Michael Anachoutlou; George Achpougas; Anna Anachoutlou; Eudokia
- Dynasty: Komnenos
- Father: John II Megas Komnenos
- Mother: Eudokia Palaiologina

Alexios II Megas Komnenos (Greek: Αλέξιος Μέγας Κομνηνός, romanized: Aléxios Mégas Komnenós; Sept./Dec. 1282 – 3 May 1330) was Emperor of Trebizond from 1297 to 1330. He was the elder son of John II and Eudokia Palaiologina.

Alexios proved to be a skillful and energetic ruler, under whose rule the Empire of Trebizond reached the apogee of its prosperity. He rebuffed the inroads of the marauding Turks, and adequately handled the encroachment of Genoa and Venice. He also cultivated the arts and sciences at his court serving as a patron to the Byzantine astronomer Gregory Chioniades and the scholar Constantine Loukites.

== Life ==
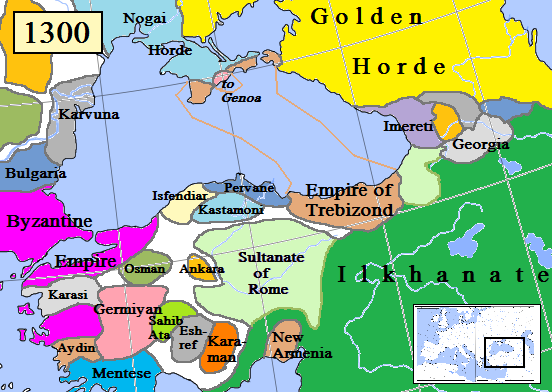
Empire of Trebizond (pink) and surrounding states in 1300

He ascended the throne at the age of 14 after the death of his father. He came under the care of his uncle, the Byzantine Emperor Andronikos II Palaiologos. The latter wanted to marry his young ward to a daughter of the high court official Nikephoros Choumnos, but Alexios without asking for the permission married an Iberian princess, Djiadjak Jaqeli, the daughter of Beka I Jaqeli, atabeg of Samtskhe, around 1300. Andronikos appealed to the Church to annul the marriage but the Patriarch refused to oblige, on the ground that the young man's wife was reported to be already pregnant. Alexios' mother Eudokia, who now returned to Trebizond on the pretext of inducing her son to dissolve the marriage, advised him to keep his Iberian wife.

In 1301 or 1302 he defeated a Turkoman invasion, who after conquering province of Chalybia, had penetrated deep into Trebizond's territory to sack Kerasous (modern Giresun), the second most important city of the Empire. Alexios captured their general and built a fort overlooking the sea to secure his possession of the city.

Another problem were the Genoese, who had established virtual economic monopoly in the Black Sea area following the Treaty of Nymphaeum with Michael VIII Palaiologos in 1261. Their settlement had outgrown Daphnous, the coastal suburb to the east of Trebizond, and the Genoese demanded more room; the Genoese merchants refused to allow the emperor's customs officials to inspect their wares. After Alexios refused the Genoese demands for further concessions in 1306, they threatened to leave Trebizond altogether. When they denied his demand for dues on any goods they took with them from Trebizond, Alexios ordered his Georgian mercenaries to attack them. Although the emperor's troops were successful, the Genoese set fire to the suburbs of Trebizond and damaged much of their own and the citizens' property. Eventually the two parties made peace, confirmed in a surviving treaty from 1314 and another from 1316.

This did not put a complete end to the tensions between the Genoese and the Emperor of Trebizond. So, in 1319 he concluded a treaty with the Venetians, Genoa's main rivals, granting them the same privileges as the Genoese as long as they paid their dues. The Byzantinist Donald Nicol observed that Alexios, as well as his successors, "did better out of the foreigners than their colleagues in Constantinople, since the Italian merchants were not allowed to trade tax-free."

Trouble for the Empire came also from the pirates of the Emirate of Sinope, whose targets were Christian traders, including the Genoese. The pirates even set fire to Trebizond itself (1319); to protect his people from these raiders, Alexios built sea walls for the city's harbour in 1324. He had already organized a police force to guard the city at night over a decade earlier.

Like his father before him, Alexios II was also the target of the Pope's efforts to convert to Catholicism. The letter was sent by John XXII in 1329, but five months later, on May 3, 1330, the Emperor died of bubonic plague, after a reign of 33 years and the throne passed to his eldest son, Andronikos. Two works survive written on the topic of the Emperor's death: a funeral oration written by his protonotarios and protovestiarios, Constantine Loukites; and a later eulogy by Joseph, the Metropolitan of Trebizond (born John Lazaropoulos).

== Coinage ==
It was during Alexios' reign that the aspers issued by the Emperors of Trebizond were notably modified in appearance and weight, perhaps the most notable change made to this coin which otherwise saw few changes between its first issue and the end of the Empire. Early in his reign not only was the silver content of the coins reduced by 15%, but the standing images of both the Emperor on the obverse and Saint Eugenios on the reverse were replaced with images of both on horseback. Jan Olof Rosenqvist provides evidence showing this horseback motif had become common on coins in the Black Sea area, beginning with the coinage of king Constantine Asen of Bulgaria a generation before. He admits that it is unclear whether "there is any connection with the ideals of chivalry prevailing in Western Europe at this time." The horseback motif appeared unchanged on the coins of all subsequent rulers until the fall of Trebizond in 1461.

== Family ==
Alexios is known to have had at least six children, and to have at least one wife, Djiadjak Jaqeli. These are:

1. Andronikos III, Emperor of Trebizond 1330–1332.
2. Basil, Emperor of Trebizond 1332–1340.
3. Michael Anachoutlou, murdered by his brother Andronikos III in 1330.
4. George Achpougas, murdered by his brother Andronikos III in 1330.
5. Anna Anachoutlou, a nun, became Empress of Trebizond 1341–1342.
6. Eudokia, also known as despoina of Sinope for marrying the Emir of that city.

One more child has been suggested:

1. An unnamed daughter, who may be the ulu hatun and presbyterissa named in a Greek epitaph at Erzincan who died on 28 December 1342.

However, Penelope Vougiouklaki, writing for the Encyclopedia of the Hellenic World: Asia Minor website, has asserted that Alexios had three wives: Pekai, daughter of Bekha Jaqeli, by whom he had Andronikos, Basil, and Eudokia; the daughter of Anachoutlou, ruler of the Laz people, by whom he had Michael Anachoutlou and Anna Anachoutlou; and "the otherwise unknown Sargale", by whom he had George Achpougas.

Alexios II of Trebizond Komnenid dynasty Born: 1282 Died: 1330
Regnal titles
Preceded by John II	Emperor of Trebizond; 1297–1330	Succeeded by Andronikos III
