= Constantine Akropolites =

14th Byzantine century scholar and statesman

Constantine Akropolites, or Acropolites (Greek: Κωνσταντῖνος Ἀκροπολίτης, Konstantinos Akropolitês; died before August 1324), was a Byzantine scholar and statesman in the fourteenth century.

== Life ==
Constantine Akropolites was the son of the scholar and statesman George Akropolites and became a minister of the Byzantine emperor Michael VIII Palaiologos, until the Emperor dismissed him for his opposition to the union of churches created by the Second Council of Lyon (1272). Under the new emperor Andronikos II, however, Akropolites returned to favor; perhaps as early as 1282 he was appointed Logothete, and on the death of Theodore Mouzalon in 1294, Akropolites was raised to the title of megas logothetes, which he held perhaps as late as 1321. He died sometime before August 1324, for a document dated May–August 1324, concerning the Monastery of the Anastasis, states he is dead.

Constantine married Maria Komnene Tornikina, and they had two daughters. Their daughter Theodora married the general Alexios Philanthropenos. Their daughter Akropolitissa married Emperor Michael of Trebizond.

== Work ==
Like his father, Akropolites wrote much on theology, especially on the more recondite doctrines, such as the procession of the Holy Ghost. In compiling lives of saints, such as that of Thomais of Lesbos, he was more usefully employed—that of St. John of Damascus is in the huge collection of Jean Bolland. According to Donald Nicol, his numerous versions of saints' lives earned him the name of Neos Metaphrastes.
