= Tzanichites =

Noble family in the Empire of Trebizond

The Tzanichitai (Greek: Τζανιχίται), singular Tzanichites (Τζανιχίτης) and feminine form Tzanichitissa (Τζανιχίτισσα), was one of the most important noble families of the late Empire of Trebizond.

== History ==
The family hailed from the castle and namesake region of Tzanicha (Greek: Τζάνιχα; Turkish: Canca), near modern Torul in Turkey. Modern scholars such as Anthony Bryer and Alexios Savvides have linked the family to the Zans (Tzannoi in Greek), a local tribe related to the Georgians. In the civil wars that tore the Empire of Trebizond in the middle of the 14th century, the Tzanichites family sided with the pro-Byzantine faction under the Scholarioi. After the civil wars ended, the Kabazites family may have replaced the Tzanichitai as hereditary governors (doukes) of the province of Chaldia. The family continues to be attested after the Fall of Trebizond to the Ottoman Empire: Ottoman tax registers contain references to its members up to 1515.

== Known members ==
- Theodore Tzanichites (Θεόδωρος Τζανιχίτης), landowner, attested in an inscription dated to 1305/6 (but as early as 1203/4 or 1210/11 by some earlier scholars).
- Irene Tzanichitissa (spelled Ἐρήνη Τζανιχίτισσα), landowner, in the same inscription as Theodore Tzanichites.
- John Tzanichites (Ἰωάννης Τζανιχίτης), pinkernes of the court in 1330–1355. In 1352, he briefly seized the castle of Tzanicha against Emperor Alexios III of Trebizond.
- Sebastos Tzanichites (Σεβαστός Τζανιχίτης), megas stratopedarches, participated in a failed uprising against Empress Irene Palaiologina in summer 1340, banished to Limnia and executed in June 1341.
- Stephen Tzanichites (Στέφανος Τζανιχίτης), successor of Sebastos Tzanichites and megas konostaulos in 1344–1350.
- Michael Tzanichites (Μιχαήλ Τζανιχίτης), killed in a naval battle against the Genoese off Caffa.
- Constantine Tzanichites (Κωνσταντῖνος Τζανιχίτης), megas konostaulos in governor of Matzouka in c. 1365–1386.
- Constantine Tzanichites (Κωνσταντῖνος Τζανιχίτης), governor of Palaiomatzouka in 1415. Likely the same person as the previous.
- [NA] Tzanichites (Τζανιχίτης), landowner in Trebizond in 1433.

== Castle ==
Bryer states that at Tzanicha (Canca) exist the remains of an old castle and two chapels. The castle is located on an elongated expanse of land 2 km northwest of modern Gümüşhane, and 400m above the south bank of the Kanis (Harsit) river. Both chapels contain paintings or inscriptions of Christian figures of the church.

== Sources ==
- Bryer, Anthony; Winfield, David (1985). The Byzantine Monuments and Topography of the Pontos, Volume One. Dumbarton Oaks Studies 20. Washington, DC: Dumbarton Oaks Research Library and Collection. ISBN 0-88402-122-X.
- Savvides, Alexios G. K. (2009). Ιστορία της Αυτοκρατορίας των Μεγάλων Κομνηνών της Τραπεζούντας (1204–1461). 2η Έκδοση με προσθήκες [History of the Empire of the Grand Komnenoi of Trebizond (1204–1461). 2nd Edition with additions] (in Greek). Thessaloniki: Kyriakidis Brothers S.A. ISBN 978-960-467-121-2.
- Trapp, Erich; Beyer, Hans-Veit; Kaplaneres, Sokrates; Leontiadis, Ioannis (1991). Prosopographisches Lexikon der Palaiologenzeit (in German). Vol. 11. Vienna: Verlag der Österreichischen Akademie der Wissenschaften. ISBN 3-7001-3003-1.
