= Amytzantarioi =

The Amytzantarioi (Greek: Aμυτζαντάριοι) or Amytzantarantes (Αμυτζανταράνται) were one of the most prominent groups in the history of the Empire of Trebizond in the civil wars of the mid-14th century, but their nature is disputed among scholars, with some considering them an aristocratic family, and others an ethnic group.

== Sources ==
- Vougiouklaki, Penelope (2003). "Amytzantarioi". Encyclopaedia of the Hellenic World, Asia Minor. Foundation of the Hellenic World.
