= Theodore Pileles Doranites =

Byzantine Greek aristocrat and military leader

Theodore Doranites (Greek: Θεόδωρος Δωρανίτης; died July 1352) also known as Pileles (Πιλέλης), was a Byzantine Greek aristocrat and military leader in the Empire of Trebizond. A prominent member of the Doranites aristocratic family from Trebizond, Theodore Doranites was one of the leading figures in the civil strife that disrupted the Empire in the 14th century.

Theodore was the brother of the protovestiarios Constantine Doranites. In 1349/50, he held the post of megas stratopedarches, and with his son and his brother-in-law, was imprisoned for a while due to his rebellious stance against Alexios III Megas Komnenos. Released, he was named protovestiarios in January 1351, only to be re-arrested and imprisoned in May as a rebel. He was finally executed with his son and brother-in-law by strangulation in July 1352.

== Sources ==
- Trapp, Erich; Walther, Rainer; Beyer, Hans-Veit; Sturm-Schnabl, Katja (1978). Prosopographisches Lexikon der Palaiologenzeit (in German). Vol. 3. Vienna: Verlag der Österreichischen Akademie der Wissenschaften. ISBN 3-7001-3003-1.
- Vougiouklaki, Penelope (2008). "Theodore Doranites". Encyclopaedia of the Hellenic World, Asia Minor. Foundation of the Hellenic World.
