= Basil of Trebizond =

Emperor of Trebizond from 1332 to 1340

Basil Megas Komnenos
- Emperor and Autocrat of all the East and Perateia
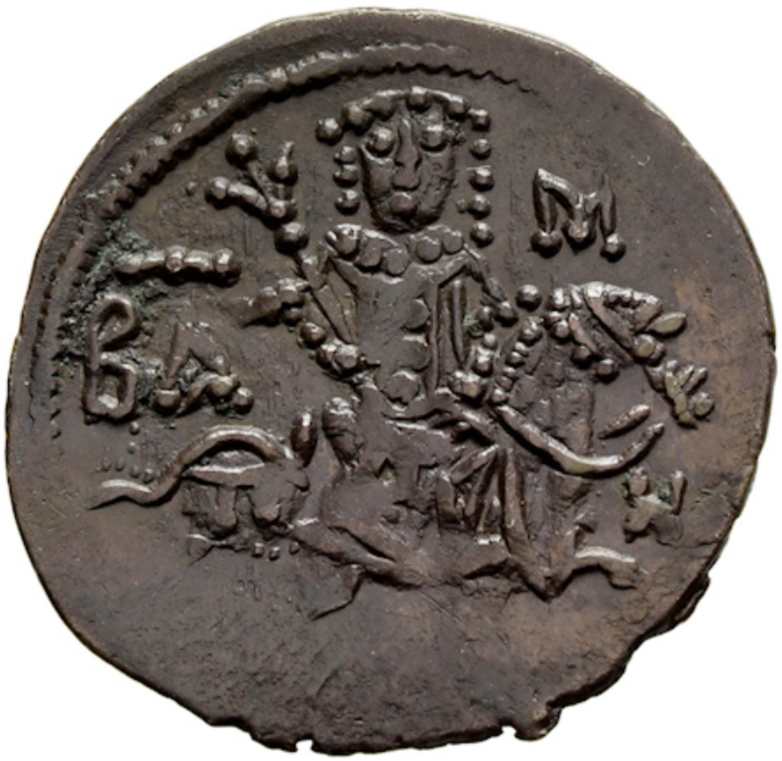
- Silver asper depicting Basil Megas Komnenos on horseback

Emperor of Trebizond
- Reign: September 1332 – 6 April 1340
- Predecessor: Manuel II
- Successor: Irene
- Died: 6 April 1340
- Spouse: Irene Palaiologina; Irene of Trebizond
- Issue: Alexios Megas Komnenos; Alexios III Megas Komnenos; Maria; Theodora
- Dynasty: Komnenos
- Father: Alexios II Megas Komnenos
- Mother: Djiadjak Jaqeli

Basil Megas Komnenos (Medieval Greek: Βασίλειος Μέγας Κομνηνός, romanized: Basileios Megas Komnēnos) (died 6 April 1340) was Emperor of Trebizond from August 1332 until his death in 1340. Although Basil's reign was a period of stability during the civil war that dominated the pocket empire during the second quarter of the 14th century, some of that conflict had its origins in his marital actions.

== Life ==
Basil was a younger son of Emperor Alexios II of Trebizond and his wife Djiadjak Jaqeli. When his oldest brother Andronikos III assumed the throne in 1330 and killed his two brothers (Michael and George), Basil happened to be in Constantinople and escaped his brothers' fate.

On the death of Andronikos III, his young son Manuel II became emperor. However, Basil was invited from Constantinople to take the throne; Manuel was deposed in August 1332 and confined to a monastery. Basil purged the court of his brother and nephew's supporters (which included the megas doux Lekes Tzatzintzaios and his son the megas domestikos Tzambas), but the man he appointed as the new megas doux, John the Eunuch, revolted in favor of the deposed Manuel. The revolt was crushed and to prevent further trouble the child was murdered in 1333, probably on Basil's order.

Despite Basil's return, the factional strife continued. According to George Finlay, the great officers and principal nobles had become petty sovereigns, reducing the countryside to anarchy. The Scholarioi, the militia of capital, became so insubordinate that Basil had to hire foreign mercenaries to protect his person, but through their arrogance and corruption they rapidly made themselves and their master hated. Such was his unpopularity with the people of the city, that when a solar eclipse took place they took it for a sign of divine wrath and forced the emperor to seek refuge in the citadel and tried to pelt him with stones.

On 17 September 1334, Basil formed a marriage alliance with the Byzantine Emperor Andronikos III Palaiologos by marrying his illegitimate daughter Irene. The affection between the two soon cooled, and Basil took a mistress also named Irene, by whom he fathered four illegitimate children. Whether or not he was actually divorced from his wife remains uncertain, but there is an interesting letter from the Patriarch of Constantinople, John XIV Kalekas, to Gregory the Metropolitan of Trebizond. In this letter the Patriarch reprimands the metropolitan, and all the other ordained men at Trebizond, for the wickedness they had allowed to take place to the injury of the holy canons, and orders them to resolve this problem on the pain of alienating the main body of the Church. The local clergy, however, contented themselves with the pretense that they were actually honoring the legitimate empress in their services since they were honoring an Irene.

The uneasy situation at the capital was exploited by the Turkmen Sheikh Hassan, who attacked Trebizond 5 July 1335. The fighting centered at the palisade of Saint Kerykios and on Mount Minthrion, but a providential rainstorm allowed the Trapezuntines to rout the attackers.

Basil died 6 April 1340, apparently poisoned by his legitimate wife Irene Palaiologina, who promptly seized the throne.

== Children ==
The children of Basil and his second wife, Irene of Trebizond, were:

1. Alexios (1337–c. 1349)
- John, later renamed Alexios III (1338–1390)
- Maria, who married Fahreddin Kutlug beg, Emir of Aq Qoyunlu in 1352.
- Theodora, who married Hajji Amir, Emir of Chalybia (Turkish: Hacıemir) in 1358.

From Irene Palaiologina or Irene of Trebizond, Basil probably had a daughter:

- Helena (died 1366), was the first wife of Bagrat V of Georgia.

Basil of Trebizond Komnenid dynasty Born: unknown Died: 6 April 1340
Regnal titles
Preceded by Manuel II	Emperor of Trebizond; 1332–1340	Succeeded by Irene
