= George Finlay =

Scottish historian (1799–1875)

- Born: 21 December 1799; Faversham, Kent, England
- Died: 26 January 1875 (aged 75); Athens, Greece
- Education: University of Glasgow, University of Göttingen, University of Edinburgh
- Occupation: Historian
- Known for: History of Greece
- Parent(s): Captain John Finlay (father), Scottish mother
- Relatives: Kirkman Finlay (uncle)
- Awards: Honorary LL.D. from the University of Edinburgh

George Finlay (21 December 1799 – 26 January 1875) was a Scottish historian.

== Biography ==
Finlay was born in Faversham, Kent, where his Scottish father, Captain John Finlay FRS, an officer in the Royal Engineers, was inspector of government powder mills. Finlay's father died in 1802, and his Scottish mother and uncle (Kirkman Finlay) took hand of his education. His love of history was attributed to his mother.

Intended for the law, he was educated at the University of Glasgow, the University of Göttingen, and the University of Edinburgh, but becoming an enthusiast in the cause of Greece, in 1823 he joined Byron in the war of independence. Thereafter he bought a property near Athens, where he settled and busied himself with schemes for the improvement of the country, which met with little success. Although he formed an unfavourable opinion of the Greek leaders, both civil and military, he did not lose his enthusiasm for their cause.

A severe attack of fever, combined with other circumstances, induced him to spend the winter of 1824–1825 and the spring of 1825 in Rome, Naples and Sicily. He then returned to Scotland, and, after spending a summer at Castle Toward, Argyllshire, went to Edinburgh, where he passed his examination in civil law at the university, with a view to being called to the Scottish bar.

However, his enthusiasm for Greece took him back there for good. He took part in the unsuccessful operations of Lord Cochrane and Sir Richard Church for the attempted relief of Athens in 1827. When independence had been secured in 1829 he bought a landed estate in Attica, but all his efforts for the introduction of a better system of agriculture ended in failure, and he devoted himself to the literary work which occupied the rest of his life, and for many years, he acted as the special correspondent of the London Times.

Finlay was elected a member of the American Antiquarian Society in 1838, and in 1854 he received from the university of Edinburgh the honorary degree of LL.D. He died in Athens.

His History of Greece, produced in sections between 1843 and 1861, did not at first receive the recognition which its merits deserved, but it has since been given by scholars in all countries, and specially in Germany, a place among works of permanent value, alike for its literary style and the depth and insight of its historical views. It was re-issued in 1877 as A History of Greece from the Roman Conquest to the Present Time (146 BC to 1864).

Confusion arising from a work of Thomas Moore on the life of Byron which refers to his uncle by full name but Finlay only by surname, lead to some of his exploits being ascribed to a putative brother Kirkman Finlay.

== Works ==
- History of the Byzantine Empire from 716 to 1057
- History of the Byzantine and Greek Empires from 1057 to 1453
- A History of Greece (From Its Conquest by the Romans to the Present Time, B.C. 146 to A.D. 1864)
  - Greece under the Romans
  - From Its Conquest by the Crusaders to Its Conquest by the Turks (1204–1461)
  - Vol V: Greece under Othoman and Venetian domination
  - History of The Greek Revolution
