= Michael Panaretos =

Greek historian (c. 1320 – c. 1390)

Michael Panaretos (Greek: Μιχαήλ Πανάρετος; c. 1320 – c. 1390) was an official of the Trapezuntine empire and a Greek historian. His sole surviving work is a chronicle of the Trapezuntine empire of Alexios I Komnenos and his successors. This chronicle not only provides a chronological framework for this medieval empire, it also contains much valuable material on the early history of the Ottoman Turks from a Byzantine perspective, however it was almost unknown until Jakob Philipp Fallmerayer discovered it in the nineteenth century among the manuscripts of the Biblioteca Marciana of Venice. "Owing to this drab but truthful chronicle," writes the Russian Byzantist Alexander Alexandrovich Vasiliev, "it has become possible to a certain extent to restore the chronological sequence of the most important events in the history of Trebizond. This Chronicle covers the period from 1204 to 1426 and gives several names of emperors formerly unknown."

== Life ==
All that is known about Panaretos is what little he tells us in his chronicle. He was a protosebastos and protonotarios in the service of Alexios III Komnenos. Panaretos makes his first appearance in an entry for 1351 when he records that he went with the mother of the emperor Alexios III, Irene of Trebizond, to Limnia against the rebel Constantine Doranites. What Panaretos' exact position was at this time is not certain, but his next appearance does not come until the Trapezuntine civil war was over when he records he went with the emperor Alexios III in a disastrous attack on Cheriana, which he himself barely escaped from with his life. Thereafter, he alludes to himself by using the first person plural when recording events in the annals. But he does not refer to himself by name until his entry dated to April 1363: he was part of an embassy, which included the megas logothetes, George Scholaris, sent to Constantinople to negotiate a marriage between one of the daughters of Alexios and one of the sons of the emperor John V Palaiologos. Besides the emperor, this embassy also met with the emperor-monk John VI Kantakuzenos, the Venetian podestà, and Leonardo Montaldo the captain of Genoese Galata in that order.

We know that he had at least two sons, both of whom died in 1368 while Penaretos was away in Constantinople: Constantine who died from drowning at the age of fifteen, and Romanos who died from disease at the age of seventeen. Panaretos was obviously greatly affected by their deaths because these are the only personal events that he describes in his chronicle.

== The Chronicle ==
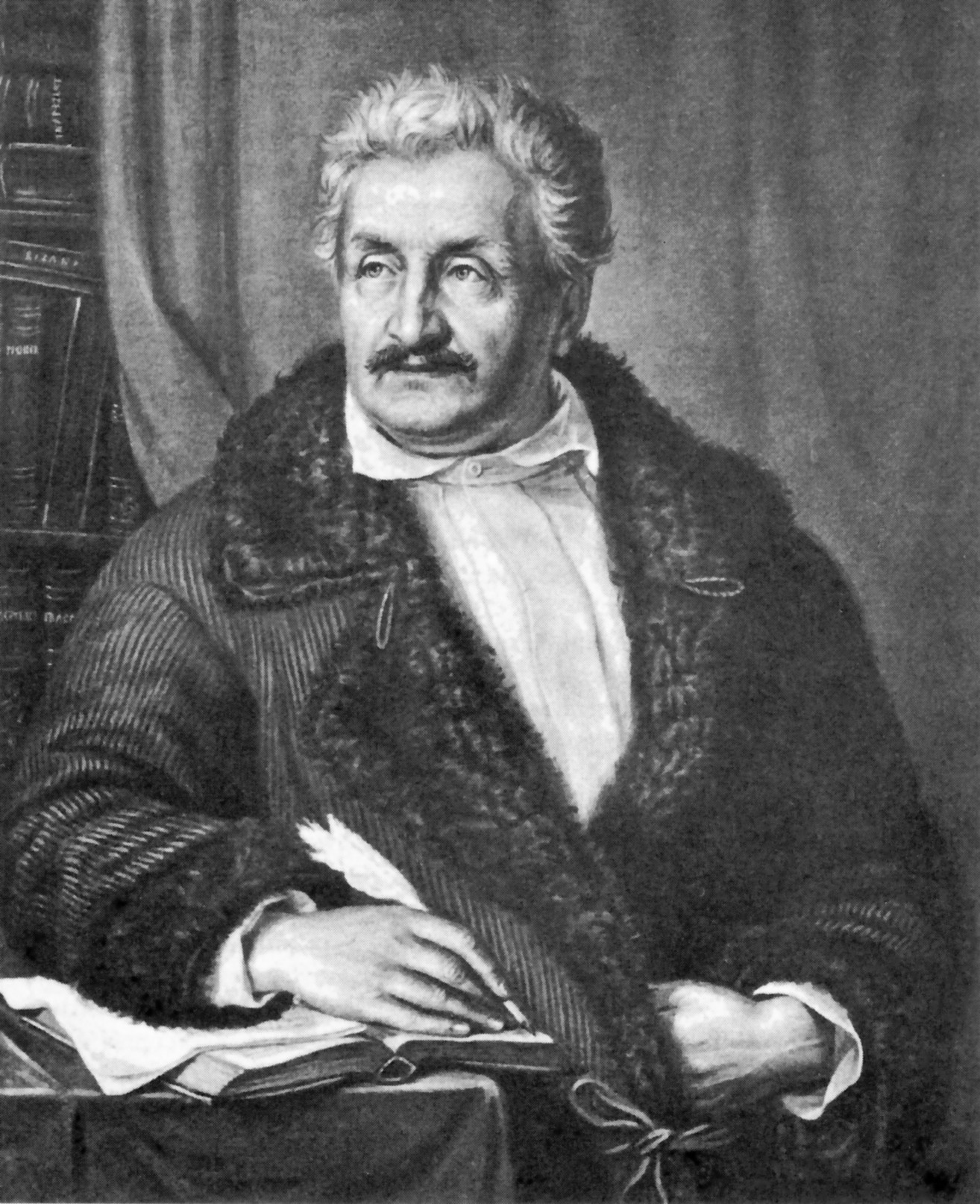
The historian Fallmerayer, who rediscovered Panaretos' chronicle in 1844

His Chronicle is a very brief work of twenty printed pages, covering the history of the Empire of Trebizond from its foundation in 1204. In its surviving form, there are at least five entries at the end dated from 1395 to 1426 (or 1429) that experts attribute to one or more continuators; a gap of about 10 lines separating the last entry (which has the date "in the same year") may be evidence that the copyist was "faced with an erasure, or simply felt constrained to omit a passage which his court readership wished to suppress", but Anthony Bryer points out the scribe "made no attempt to cover up the fact." Bryer himself proposed that this gap had contained at least two entries referring to the assassination of Emperor Alexios IV Megas Komnenos.

It is not known where Panaretos found information for his work; he makes no allusions to his sources in the body of his work. About half of the chronicle is devoted to the years between 1349 and 1390, which falls into his adult lifetime. Interviews with older contemporaries could provide material for the generation before his lifetime. Fallmerayer pointed to a passage in Bessarion's Encomium on Trebizond which states there was a frescoed hall in the imperial palace displaying portraits of all of the Grand Komnenoi with their families in chronological order with brief accounts of their reign. "This dynastic gallery with its inscriptions might have easily served Panaretos as a background for his brief pre-chronicle. He needed only to copy it." Panaretos provides chronological information on rulers up to Alexios III in two forms -- dates when the ruler began and ended his or her reign, and the length of the reign -- which do not always match, suggesting he drew on at least two written sources for this data.

Panaretos differs from the tradition of Greek historians by not writing in a learned, Attic Greek, but in the Pontic Greek which was commonly used in the Trebizond of his time. Throughout the chronicle, Panaretos never refers to his countrymen as Greeks, as was the custom in Byzantium, but as Romaioi, or as Christians. Although the chronicle ends in 1426, scholarly consensus is that the last four entries were written by an anonymous contributor.

The sole copy of this work is part of Marcianus graecus 608/coll. 306, one of six works contained in this manuscript. All of the works comprising this manuscript were written by the same group of scribes; the paper of this manuscript has watermarks indicating it was made between 1440 and 1450, which led Peter Schreiner to date this manuscript to that decade. Although the manuscript had thought to have come to the Biblioteca Marciana from the private library of Bessarion, Schreiner's investigation shows it had been owned in the later 15th century (during Bessarion's lifetime) by Johannes Zacharias; at some point in the 18th century the manuscript came into the possession of Giambattisti Recanti, whose will bequeathed his private library to the Biblioteca 12 November 1734. Although Panaretos' Chronicle was discovered by Fallmerayer, the editio princeps was the work of his colleague Gottlieb Tafel who published the Greek text in 1832 in an appendix to his edition of Eustathius of Thessalonica but without translation or commentary. Fallmerayer published an edition of the Greek text with a German translation and commentary in 1844. The first scholarly, critical text of the Chronicle was done by Spyrindon P. Lambros, a Greek scholar, in 1907. Another edition was published by Odysseus Lampsides in 1958. The most recent edition, with an English translation, was by Scott Kennedy in 2019.
