= Limnia (Pontus) =

Limnia (Greek: τα Λιμνία) was the westernmost subdivision of the medieval Empire of Trebizond, consisting of the southern coastline of the Black Sea, around the mouth of the Yeşilırmak River.

Anthony Bryer traces its origins to a Byzantine supply base named Kinte, used by Emperor John II Komnenos in the winter solstice of 1140. By the next century, it "finally became the Trapezuntine stronghold of Limnia, with a see and thirteen imperial fortresses; it figures on portolan maps until the sixteenth century". In 1297, the Trapezuntine Emperor John II Grand Komnenos died while in Limnia. In 1317, according to Bryer, although it "was the last and lowliest of the suffragans of Amaseia, its bishops assumed the metropolitan rights of the inland city". On the other hand, Speros Vryonis explains that the metropolitan of Amaseia, one Callistus, who had been appointed to fill a long-standing vacancy in 1315, had been unable to enter his see during a Turkoman invasion, and in 1317 a synodal decree directed him to reside in Limnia "until conditions improved and the Turks would permit him to enter Amaseia".

In 1384 is the final reference to a bishop of Limnia: a surviving document records that the bishop was directed to take over the administration of Amaseia because the metropolitan could not enter the territory. In 1386, Tajeddin çelebi, Emir of Limnia, was succeeded by his son Altamur. Between the two dates, Limnia irrevocably slipped from Trapezuntine control and became a Turkoman possession. Its latest mention is in 1580, on the map of Ortelius.

== Sources ==
- Vryonis, Speros (1971). The Decline of Medieval Hellenism in Asia Minor and the Process of Islamization from the Eleventh through the Fifteenth Century. University of California Press. ISBN 0-520-01597-5.
