= List of Pontic Greeks =

This is a list of Pontic Greeks (Pontic: Ρωμαίοι, Ρωμιοί, Romaioi; Greek: Πόντιοι, Pontioi ), i.e. Greeks from the region of Pontus, in modern northern Turkey.

== Ancient ==
- Diogenes (412/404 BC – 323 BC), also known as Diogenes the Cynic, was a Greek philosopher and one of the founders of Cynic philosophy
- Diphilus (342–291 BC), of Sinope, a poet of the new Attic comedy and contemporary of Menander
- Dionysodorous of Amaseia, mathematician who calculated the circumference of the Earth
- Mithridates VI Eupator (132–63 BC), the most important king of the Kingdom of Pontus
- Laodice, Mithridates VI's sister and first wife
- Diophantus, son of Asclepiodorus, of Sinope, was a general in the service of Mithridates VI of Pontus
- Cleopatra of Pontus (born 110 BC), the Pontic wife of Tigranes the Great and daughter of Mithridates VI of Pontus
- Arcathius, a prince from the Kingdom of Pontus
- Machares, a Pontian prince and son of King Mithridates VI of Pontus and Queen Laodice
- Pharnaces II of Pontus, a prince, then King of Pontus and the Bosporan until his death
- Athenais Philostorgos II, princess from Kingdom of Pontus, was a Roman Client Queen of Cappadocia
- Stratonice of Pontus, a Greek woman from the Kingdom of Pontus, a mistress and fourth wife of King Mithridates VI of Pontus
- Xiphares, a Pontian Greek prince, son of King Mithridates VI of Pontus and Stratonice of Pontus

== Roman ==
- Pythodorida of Pontus (30 BC or 29 BC – 38)
- Polemon I of Pontus (1st century BC, died 8 BC)
- Polemon II of Pontus (12 BC/11 BC–74)
- Strabo (63/64 BC–24 AD), a Greek historian, geographer and philosopher
- Saint Gregory of Neocaesarea, a Christian bishop of the 3rd century
- Saint Eugenios of Trebizond, martyred under Diocletian (284–305) and a cult devoted to him developed in Trebizond
- Anicetus (1st century), pirate, leader of unsuccessful anti-Roman uprising in Pontus in 69

== Byzantine ==
=== Rulers of the Trebizond Empire ===
- Alexios I Komnenos (1056–1118/1048), Byzantine emperor from 1081 to 1118, and the founder of the Komnenian dynasty
- Andronikos I of Trebizond, Emperor of Trebizond from 1222 to 1235
- Ioannis I Megas Komnenos, Emperor of Trebizond from 1235 to 1238
- Manuel I Megas Komnenos, Emperor of Trebizond from 1238 to 1263
- Andronikos II Megas Komnenos, Emperor of Trebizond from 1263 to 1266
- Georgios Megas Komnenos, Emperor of Trebizond from 1266 to 1280
- Ioannis II Megas Komnenos, Emperor of Trebizond from 1280 to 1297
- Theodora Megale Komnene, Empress of Trebizond from 1284 to 1285
- Alexios II of Trebizond (1282 – 1330), Emperor of Trebizond from 1297 to 1330
- David Megas Komnenos (c. 1408 – 1 November 1463) Last Emperor of Trebizond from 1459 to 1461

=== Clerics ===
- Ecumenical Patriarch John VIII, patriarch of Constantinople from 1064 to 1075. (also saint)

=== Scholars ===
- Gregory Choniades (died 1302), astronomer
- Constantine Loukites (1280–1340), poet
- Nicephorus Gregoras (1295–1360), astronomer
- Michael Panaretos (1320–c. 1390), historian, protosebastos and protonotarios in the service of Alexios III Megas Komnenos
- George of Trebizond (1395–1472 or 1473), a philosopher and scholar, one of the pioneers of the Renaissance
- George Amiroutzes (1400–1470), a Renaissance scholar and philosopher, a servant of Sultan Mehmed II
- Basilios Bessarion (1403–1472), a Catholic Cardinal Bishop and the titular Latin Patriarch of Constantinople, one of Greek scholars who contributed to the great revival of letters in the 15th century

== Early Modern ==
- Sevastos Kyminitis (1630–1703), scholar who founded the Phrontisterion of Trapezous
- Constantine Mourouzis (died 1783), was a Phanariote Prince of Moldavia, and member of the Mourousis family
- Alexander Ypsilantis (1792–1828), leader of the Filiki Eteria, Greek military commander and national hero
- Demetrios Ypsilantis (1793–1832), second son of Constantine Ypsilantis, one of the early leaders of the Greek Revolution, general under John Capodistria
- Euklidis Kourtidis (1885–1937), Greek revolutionary leader of Pontos (a.k.a. Kapetan Euklidis)
- Nikos Kapetanidis (1889-1922), journalist and activist executed during the Amasya trials
- Anastasios Papadopoulos (1896-1922), Greek revolutionary leader of Pontos (a.k.a. Koja Anastas)
- Venetia Kotta (1897-1945), archaeologist and historian

== Contemporary ==
=== Actors ===
- Pamphylia Tanailidi (1891–1937)
- Periklis Hristoforidis (1907–1983)
- Panos Papadopulos (1920-2001)
- Nikos Xanthopoulos (1934-2023)
- Martha Karagianni (1939-2022)
- Vasilis N. Triantafillidis (1940-2018) (a.k.a. Harry Klyn)
- Nikos Sergianopoulos (1952–2008)
- Ieroklis Michailidis (b. 1960)
- Denis Podalydès (b. 1963)
- Fanis Mouratidis (b. 1970)
- Victoria Haralabidou (b. 1971)
- Giorgos Kapoutzidis (b. 1972)
- Alex Dimitriades (b. 1973)
- Mary Akrivopoulou (b. 1975)

=== Artists ===
- Joannis Avramidis (1922-2016), sculptor
- Arkhip Kuindzhi (1842–1910), Russian landscape painter
- Sergey Merkurov (1881–1952), prominent Soviet sculptor-monumentalist of Greek-Armenian ancestry
- Nonda (1922-2005), leading Greek artist of the School of Paris
- Georges Candilis, (1913 – 1995), architect and urbanist
- Kyriak Kostandi, (1852-1921), prominent painter and an art scholar
- Dmitri Sinodi-Popov (1855 – 1910), artist

=== Athletes ===
==== Basketball ====
- Michalis Romanidis (b. 1966)
- Vasilis Lipiridis (b. 1967)
- Jake Tsakalidis (b. 1979)
- Dimitris Diamantidis (b. 1980)
- Lazaros Papadopoulos (b. 1980)
- Loukas Mavrokefalidis (b. 1984)
- Kostas Vasileiadis (b. 1984)

==== Football ====
- Georgios Amanatidis (b. 1970)
- Ioannis Amanatidis (b. 1981)
- Antonis Antoniadis (b. 1945)
- Christos Archontidis (coach also)
- Stefanos Athanasiadis (b. 1988)
- Elias Atmatsidis (b. 1969)
- Giorgios Georgiadis (b. 1987)
- Aristidis Kamaras (b. 1939) (mother)
- Kiriakos Karataidis (b. 1965)
- Yevhen Khacheridi (b. 1987) Ukrainian-Greek footballer for Dynamo Kyiv
- Savvas Kofidis (b. 1961) (coach also)
- Stan Lazaridis (b. 1972) former football player who represented his homeland Australia
- Yuri Lodygin (b. 1990) Russian-Greek goalkeeper for Zenit Saint Petersburg
- Takis Loukanidis (b. 1937)
- Dimitris Mavrogenidis (b. 1976)
- Kostas Nestoridis (b. 1930)
- Demis Nikolaidis (b. 1973)
- Antonios Nikopolidis (b. 1971)
- Andreas Niniadis (b. 1971) (assistant coach also)
- Dimitrios Papadopoulos (b. 1981)
- Mimis Papaioannou (b. 1942)
- Evstaphiy Pechlevanidis (b. 1960)
- Ilias Poursanidis (b. 1972)
- Ilias Rossidis (b. 1928)
- Dimitris Salpingidis (b. 1981)
- Giourkas Seitaridis (b. 1981)
- Ieroklis Stoltidis (b. 1975)
- Efstathios Tavlaridis (b. 1980)
- Ioannis Topalidis (b. 1962) (coach also)
- Vasilis Torosidis (b. 1985)
- Panagiotis Tsalouchidis (b. 1963)
- Zisis Vryzas (b. 1973) (mother)

==== Martial Arts ====
- Charalambos Cholidis (b. 1956), former wrestler
- Anton Christoforidis (b. 1918), former NBA world light heavyweight champion
- Michael Katsidis (b. 1980), Australian professional boxer, former WBO interim lightweight champion
- Stan Longinidis (b. 1965), retired professional Australian Heavyweight kickboxer and 8 time Kickboxing World Champion
- Andreas Michailidis, (b. 1988), Greek mixed martial artist
- Elisavet Mystakidou (b. 1977), taekwondo practitioner and Olympic medalist
- Christos Navrozidis, (b. 1993), Greek freestyle wrestler and bare-knuckle fighter
- Alexandros Nikolaidis (1979-2022), taekwondo athlete and Olympic medalist
- Panagiotis Poikilidis (b. 1965), wrestler
- Mike Zambidis (b. 1980), professional kickboxer, a 13 time World Champion, and current W.K.B.F. super-welterweight kickboxing world champion

==== Track & Field ====
- Anastasia Kelesidou (b. 1972), discus thrower
- Voula Patoulidou (b. 1965), competed in the 100 metres, 100 metres hurdles and in the long jump events
- Ekaterini Stefanidi (b. 1990), pole vaulter
- Georgios Theodoridis (b. 1972), sprinter specializing in the 60 metres and 100 metres
- Athanasia Tsoumeleka (b. 1982) (mother), race walker

==== Water Sports ====
- Andreas Kilingaridis (1976–2013), sprint canoer
- Aikaterini Nikolaidou (b. 1992), rower
- Nikolaos Siranidis (b. 1976), diver

==== Weightlifting ====
- Ilya Ilyin (b. 1988) (Pontian maternal grandfather, Iakovos Fountoukidis)
- Valerios Leonidis (b. 1966)
- Kakhi Kakhiashvili (b. 1969) (grandmother)

==== Various Sports ====
- Eleni Daniilidou (b. 1982), tennis player
- Ioannis Melissanidis (b. 1977), artistic gymnast
- Ioannis Tamouridis (b. 1980), cyclist
- Elena Vesnina (b. 1986), tennis player (Greek Pontian grandfather)

=== Business ===
- Konstantinos Theofylaktos, was a banker and mayor of Trabzon from 1916 to 1918
- Filaret Galchev (b. 1963), Russian businessman, chairman of Eurocement group (real name Filaretos Kaltsidis)
- Mike Lazaridis (b. 1961), founder and co-CEO of Research In Motion (RIM), which created and manufactures the BlackBerry wireless handheld device
- Dimitris Melissanidis (b. 1946), founder of Aegean Marine Petroleum, president of AEK Athens F.C. from 1992 to 1995
- Ivan Savvidi (b. 1959), Deputy to the State Duma of the Russian Federation, Chairman of PAOK FC and FC SKA Rostov-on-Don, Businessman and president of the Federation of Greek Communities of Russia
- Evangelos Marinakis (b. 1967)(mother), Businessman

=== Journalists ===
- Vicky Hadjivassiliou (mother)
- Nikos Kapetanidis Pontic Greek journalist and newspaper publisher
- Mary Kostakidis (b. 1954), former weeknight SBS World News Australia presenter
- Alexandra Pascalidou (b. 1970), journalist, television hostess and author
- Pantelis Savvidis (b. 1954)
- Tatiana Stefanidou (b. 1970)
- Makis Triantafyllopoulos (grandmother)
- Popi Tsapanidou
- George Valavanis

=== Military ===
- Achilles Sakis (Tsakeredes), United States Air Force - Retired, Flight test engineer & U.S. Air Force Test Pilot School graduate and instructor, later with Google X Project Wing
- James G. Stavridis, Retired United States Navy admiral & 12th Dean of the Fletcher School of Law and Diplomacy at Tufts University
- Vladimir Triandafillov (1894–1931), Soviet military commander and theoretician (real surname Triantafyllidis)
- Vladimir Kokkinaki (1904–1985), Soviet test pilot who set twenty-two world records and served as president of the Fédération Aéronautique Internationale.
- Mikhail Khronopulo, Soviet Navy admiral, the penultimate commander of the Soviet Black Sea Fleet.

=== Models ===
- Olympia Hopsonidou (b. 1983), Star Hellas 2006

=== Music ===
- Aristotelis Koundouroff (1896–1969), composer of the Modern Era
- Iovan Tsaous (1893–1942), musician, and composer of rebetiko songs (real name Yiannis Eitziridis or Etseiridis)
- Odysseas Dimitriadis (1908–2005), classical music conductor
- Stelios Kazantzidis (1931–2001), Greek singer of Greek popular music, or Laïkó, he collaborated with many of Greece's composers (father)
- Chrysanthos (1934–2005), singer and songwriter (his surname is Theodoridis)
- Pavlos Sidiropoulos (1948–1990), rock singer, guitarist, songwriter and the "father" of the Greek Rock (father)
- Diamanda Galas (b. 1955), US avant-garde composer, vocalist, pianist, performance artist and painter (Pontian ancestry on her father's side)
- Lefteris Hapsiadis (1953-2023) lyricist, poet and writer of novels
- Vasilis Karras (1953-2023), Greek folk singer (real surname Kesoglidis)
- Kelly Kelekidou (b. 1978), Greek singer
- Lefteris Pantazis (b. 1955), Greek folk singer (real surname Pagozidis)
- Antonis Remos (b. 1970), Greek laïko singer (real surname Paschalidis)
- Natassa Theodoridou (b. 1970), Greek singer
- Matthaios Tsahouridis (b. 1978), plays a range of stringed musical instruments including pontic kemenche, Ph.D. in musicology
- Despina Vandi (b. 1969), Greek singer
- Paola Foka (b. 1982), Greek singer (partial)
- Ilias Kementzides (1926-2006), American lyra player and singer

=== Politics ===
- Adonis Georgiadis (b. 1972), Greek politician, historian, publisher, and author
- Leonidas Iasonidis (1884–1959), political activist, congressman of Greek parliament and minister
- Ioannis Passalidis (1886–1968), a prominent member of the Greek Left and founder of the United Democratic Left party
- Dimitrios Partsalidis (1903/1905–1980), communist politician
- Nikos Papadopoulos (b. 1939) Greek-born Swedish Social Democrat politician
- Gavriil Kharitonovich Popov (b. 1936), former mayor of Moscow (real name Gavriil Papadopoulos)
- Savvas Tsitouridis (b. 1954), politician and member of the New Democracy and former Minister for Employment and Social Protection
- Markos Vafiadis (1906–1992), leading cadre of the Communist Party of Greece (KKE) during the Greek Civil War

=== Science/academia ===
- George Gurdjieff (1866? – 1949), a mystic and spiritual teacher (real name Georgios Georgiades)
- Viktor Sarianidi (b. 1929), well-known Soviet archaeologist
- Fyodor Yurchikhin (b. 1959), cosmonaut and spacecraft's mechanical engineer (mother)
- John Ioannidis (b. 1965), American scientist, professor, and author
- Ivan Dzhukha, (b. 1952), geologist

=== Writers ===
- Aris Alexandrou (1922–1978), a novelist, poet and translator (father)
- Diana Anphimiadi (b. 1982), Georgian poet, journalist, publicist, linguist and teacher
- Christos Chomenidis (b. 1966)
- Thea Halo (b. 1941) (mother), author of Not Even My Name, a memoir of her mother's experiences during the Greek genocide
  - Sano Halo (1909-2014), survivor of the Greek genocide and nicknamed Grandmother of the Pontic Greeks
- Theodor Kallifatides (b. 1938) (father)
- Dimitris Psathas (1907–1979), journalist and satirical writer (mother)
- Nikolay Sherbina (b. 1821), Russian poet of 19th century (maternal grandparent)
- Stephanos Papadopoulos (b.1976) Greek American Poet (father)
- Nikos Grigoriadis (1931-2012), poet and educator.

=== Various ===
- A. I. Bezzerides (1908–2007), Greek-Armenian novelist and screenwriter, best known for writing Noir and Action motion pictures, especially several of Warners' "social conscience" films of the 1940s (father)
- Anastasios Papadopoulos (1896–1922), guerilla fighter and leading figure of Pontus
- Yanis Kanidis (1930–2004), Greek-Russian physical education teacher & hero who died to save the lives of his students during the Beslan school hostage crisis
- Filon Ktenidis (1889–1963), playwright, accountant, journalist, doctor and the founder of Panagia Soumela in Kastania, Vermiou in Greece
- Dmitry Aynalov (1862-1939), art historian
