= List of empresses of the Byzantine successor states =

This is a list of the consorts of the four main Byzantine Greek successor states of the Byzantine Empire following the Fourth Crusade in 1204 and up to their conquest by the Ottoman Empire in the middle of the 15th century. These states were Nicaea, Trebizond, Epirus, and the Morea. The last two never actually claimed the imperial title, except briefly under Theodore Komnenos Doukas in the late 1220s, who began as ruler of Epirus but crowned himself emperor in Thessalonica.

== Empress of Nicaea ==
Laskarid dynasty (1204–1261)
Picture	Name	Father	Birth	Marriage	Became Empress	Ceased to be Empress	Death	Spouse
	Anna Angelina	Alexios III (Angeloi)	c. 1176	1199 or early 1200	1204 death of brother-in-law 1205 husband proclaimed as emperor	1212		Theodore I
	Philippa of Armenia	Ruben III of Armenia (Rubenid)	1183	24 November 1214		1216	before 1219	Theodore I
	Marie de Courtenay	Peter, Latin Emperor (Courtenay)	c. 1204	1219		November 1221	September 1228	Theodore I
	Irene Laskarina (Ειρήνη Λασκαρίνα)	Theodore I (Laskaris)	?	1212	December 1221	1239		John III
	Anna of Hohenstaufen	Frederick II, Holy Roman Emperor (Hohenstaufen)	1230	1244		3 November 1254	April 1307	John III
	Elena Asenina of Bulgaria	Ivan II of Bulgaria (Asen)	1224	1235		March 1252		Theodore II
Palaiologan dynasty (1259–1261)
	Theodora Palaiologina	John Doukas Vatatzes (Vatatzes)	c. 1240	1253	1 January 1259	25 July 1261	4 March 1303	Michael VIII
Picture	Name	Father	Birth	Marriage	Became Empress	Ceased to be Empress	Death	Spouse

== Empress of Trebizond ==
The consorts of rulers of Trebizond, like their counterparts in the other two Byzantine successor states, the Empire of Nicaea and the Despotate of Epirus, initially claimed the traditional Byzantine title of Empress consort the Romans. However, after reaching an agreement with the restored Byzantine Empire in 1282, the official title of the consorts of Trebizond was changed to Empress consort of the entire East, of the Iberians and the Perateia and remained such until the Empire's end in 1461. The state is sometimes called the Komnenian or Megalokomnenian empire from its ruling dynasty. Trebizond had three reigning empresses, Theodora of Trebizond (1284–1285), Irene Palaiologina (1340–1341), and Anna of Trebizond (1341–1342).

Megalokomnenid dynasty (1204–1461)
Picture	Name	Father	Birth	Marriage	Became Empress	Ceased to be Empress	Death	Spouse
	Theodora Axuchina	John Komnenos Axouchos (Axouchoi)	?	?	around April 1204	1 February 1222	?	Alexios I
	Komnene	Alexios I (Komnenoi)	?	c. 1222?	1 February 1222	1235	?	Andronikos I
	Mother of Ioannikes	?	?	?	1235	1238	?	John I
	Anna Xylaloe	?	?	1235	1238	1240s		Manuel I
	Rusudan of Georgia	David VI of Georgia or David VII of Georgia (Bagratids)	?	1240s		1250s or early 1260s		Manuel I
	Irene Syrikaina	?	?	1250s or early 1260s		March 1263	?	Manuel I
	Eudokia Palaiologina (Ευδοκία Παλαιολογίνα)	Michael VIII Palaiologos (Palaiologoi)	c. 1265	1282		16 August 1297	1302	John II
	Jiajak Jaqeli	Beka I Jaqeli (Jaqeli)	?	c. 1300		3 May 1330	?	Alexios II
	Irene Palaiologina (Ειρήνη Παλαιολογίνα)	Andronikos III Palaiologos (Palaiologoi)	c. 1315	1335		1339	after 1341	Basilios
	Irene (Ειρήνη η μεγάλη Κομνηνή)	?	?	1339		6 April 1340	after 1382	Basilios
	Acropolitissa	Constantine Acropolites (Acropolites)	?	1297–1341	30 July 1341 1st reign 3 May 1344 2nd reign	13 December 1349	?	Michael
	Theodora Kantakouzene	Nikephoros Kantakouzenos	c. 1340	28 September 1351		20 March 1390	?	Alexios III
	Eudokia of Georgia	David IX of Georgia (Bagratids)	?	6 September 1377	20 March 1390	2 May 1395		Manuel III
	Anna Philanthropene	Manuel Angelos Philanthropenos	?	c. 1395		5 March 1417	?	Manuel III
	Theodora Kantakouzene	Theodore Palaiologos Kantakouzenos (Kantakouzenoi)	c. 1382	1395	1395 as co-empress consort 5 March 1417 as sole-empress consort	12 November 1426		Alexios IV
	Maria Gattilusio as Co-Empress of Trebizond	Dorino of Lesbos (Gattilusio)	?	?	?	October 1429	?	Alexander, Co-Emperor
	Unnamed Georgian princess	Alexander I of Georgia (Bagratids)	c. 1415	c. 1426	before 28 October 1429	1438		John IV
	Unnamed Turkish lady	Dawlat Berdi	?	?	?	before April 22, 1459	?	John IV
	Maria of Gothia	Alexios of Theodoro (Gabras)	?	?	?	?	?/before 1447	David
	Helena Kantakouzene	? (Kantakouzenoi)	?	?	before 22 April 1459	15 August 1461	1463	David
Picture	Name	Father	Birth	Marriage	Became Empress	Ceased to be Empress	Death	Spouse

== Consorts in Epirus ==
Angelos-Komnenos-Doukas dynasty (1205–1318)
Picture	Name	Father	Birth	Marriage	Became consort	Ceased to be consort	Death	Spouse
	Unknown	(Melissenos)	?	?	?	?	?	Michael I
	Unknown	an Epirote magnate (Melissenos)	?	?	?	?	?	Michael I
	Maria Petraliphaina	? (Petraliphas)	?	c. 1216	c. 1216; 1224 as Empress in Thessalonica	1230	?	Theodore
	Theodora Petraliphaina	John Petraliphas (Petraliphas)	1225	about 1231		1268	?	Michael II
	Maria Doukaina Laskarina	Theodore II Laskaris (Laskaris)	?	1256 as Despoina within the Nicaean empire, never in Epirus		1258		Nikephoros I
	Anna Palaiologina Kantakouzene	? (Palaiologos or Kantakouzenos)	?	1264	1268	1297?	?	Nikephoros I
	Anna Palaiologina	Michael IX Palaiologos (Palaiologos)	?	ca. 1307		1318	1320	Thomas I
Orsini dynasty (1318–1359)
	Anna Palaiologina	Michael IX Palaiologos (Palaiologos)	?	1318; 2nd time		1320		Nicholas
	Anna Palaiologina	Andronikos Palaiologos Angelos (Palaiologos or Komnenos Doukas)	?	after 1324		1335	?	John
	Maria Kantakouzene	John VI Kantakouzenos (Kantakouzenos)	-	after 1339	1347 as Despoina within the Byzantine empire 1355 as Despoina in Epirus	1356/1359	after 1359	Nikephoros II
Nemanjić and Buondelmonti dynasties (1359–1411)
	Thomais Orsini	John II Orsini (Orsini)	?	after 1348	1359	1366	?	Simeon
	Maria Angelina Doukaina Palaiologina (Μαρία Αγγελίνα Δούκαινα Παλαιολογίνα)	Simeon Uroš (Nemanjić)	?	1359–1360	1366	23 December 1384	28 December 1394	Thomas II
	Maria Angelina Doukaina Palaiologina (Μαρία Αγγελίνα Δούκαινα Παλαιολογίνα)	Simeon Uroš (Nemanjić)	?	February 1385		28 December 1394		Esau
	Irene Bova Shpata	John Bova Shpata (Shpata)	?	January 1396		?	?	Esau
	Eudokia Balšić	Đurađ I Balšić (Balšić)	?	?		6 February 1411	after 1411	Esau
Tocco dynasty (1411–1479)
	Francesca Acciaioli	Nerio I Acciaioli (Acciaioli)	?	?	1411?	1429?	?	Carlo I Tocco
	Ramondina of Ventimiglia	Giovanni I of Ventimiglia (Ventimiglia)	?	?	1429?	1448?	?	Carlo II Tocco
	Milica of Serbia	Lazar Branković (Branković)	?	1 May 1463		1464		Leonardo III Tocco
	Francesca Marzano	Mariano Marzano, Prince of Rossano (Marzano)	?	1477		1479?	?	Leonardo III Tocco
Picture	Name	Father	Birth	Marriage	Became consort	Ceased to be consort	Death	Spouse

== Consorts in the Morea ==
Kantakouzenoi dynasty (1347–1383)
	Maria de Lusignan	Constantine II, King of Armenia (Lusignan)	c. or after 1333	c. 1347	25 October 1349	10 April 1380	1382–1387	Manuel Kantakouzenos
Palaiologan dynasty (1383–1460)
	Bartolomea Acciaioli	Nerio I Acciaioli (Acciaioli)	?	?	1383?	1407?	?	Theodore I Palaiologos
	Cleofa Malatesta	Malatesta I, Count of Pesaro (Malatesta)	?	21 January 1421 or sometime in 1422		1433		Theodore II Palaiologos
	Theodora Tocco	Leonardo II Tocco (Tocco)	?	1 July 1428	c. 1428 as Despoina in Morea	November 1429		Constantine XI Palaiologos
	Caterina Gattilusio	Dorino of Lesbos (Gattilusio)	?	27 July 1441 as Despoina in Morea		July/August 1442		Constantine XI Palaiologos
	Theodora Asanina	Paul Asanes (Asanes)	?	before 1443	before 1443 as a Despoina in Morea; 29 May 1453 as Byzantine co-empress consort	1460	?	Demetrios Palaiologos
	Catherine Zaccaria	Centurione II Zaccaria (Zaccaria)	around 1392	January 1430	before 1432 as a Despoina in Morea; 29 May 1453 as Byzantine co-empress consort	1460	16 August 1462	Thomas Palaiologos
Picture	Name	Father	Birth	Marriage	Became Consort	Ceased to be Consort	Death	Spouse

== See also ==
- List of Roman and Byzantine empresses
- List of Holy Roman empresses
- List of Russian royal consorts
- List of Latin empresses
- List of Greek royal consorts
