= List of Trapezuntine emperors =

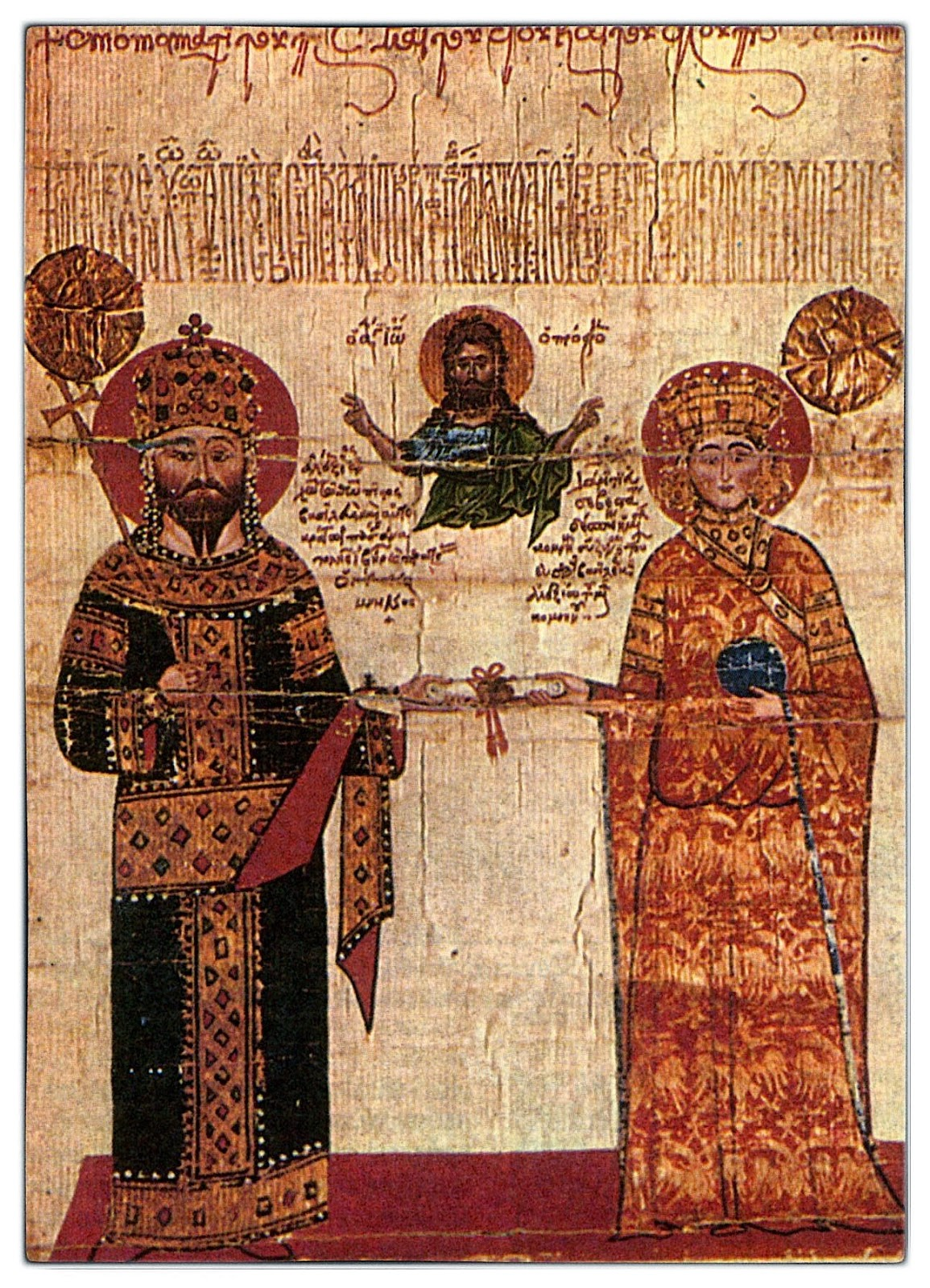
Alexios III Megas Komnenos (r. 1349–1390), the longest-reigning Trapezuntine emperor, and his wife Theodora Kantakouzene

The Trapezuntine emperors were the rulers of the Empire of Trebizond, one of the successor states of the Byzantine Empire founded after the Fourth Crusade in 1204, until its fall to the Ottoman Empire in 1461. All but two of the Trapezuntine rulers belonged to the Komnenos dynasty, which had previously ruled the Byzantine Empire from 1081 to 1185. They initially claimed to represent the legitimate line of Roman emperors, in opposition to the Latin Empire in Constantinople, the Laskaris dynasty of the Nicene Empire, and the Komnenos Doukas family of Epirus and Thessalonica. To emphasize their dynastic claim, Trapezuntine emperors from the late 13th century onwards styled themselves as Megas Komnenos (Μέγας Κομνηνός, lit. 'Grand Komnenos').

Out of the Byzantine claimants that emerged in 1204 and thereafter, the Trapezuntine emperors, despite their illustrious descent, had perhaps the worst position. Not only were they far away from Constantinople in a peripheral province of the empire, but the reputation of the Komnenoi had been severely damaged by the detested last emperor of the dynasty, Andronikos I Komnenos (r. 1183–1185), grandfather of the first Trapezuntine emperor Alexios I (r. 1204–1222). Though they continued to claim to be the legitimate rulers of the entire former Byzantine Empire for decades thereafter, conflict with the Nicene Empire and the Sultanate of Rum in the early 13th century reduced the power of the Trapezuntine emperors. After the fall of Sinope to Sultan Kaykaus I in 1214, the Empire of Trebizond ceased to be a major contender for restoring the Byzantine Empire and became reduced to a small and local power.

After the Nicene Empire under Michael VIII Palaiologos retook Constantinople in 1261, the rulers of Trebizond continued to style themselves as 'Emperor and Autocrat of the Romans' (βασιλεὺς καὶ αὐτοκράτωρ Ῥωμαῖων), viewing the Palaiologos dynasty as just another family of usurpers. The Trapezuntine title was altered in 1282, 21 years later, to 'Emperor and Autocrat of all the East, the Iberians, and the Transmarine Provinces' (βασιλεὺς καὶ αὐτοκράτωρ πάσης Ἀνατολῆς, Ἰβήρων καὶ Περατείας) in order to placate Michael VIII Palaiologos after John II Megas Komnenos (r. 1280–1297) of Trebizond married his daughter, Eudokia Palaiologina. Initially, the Palaiologoi emperors in Constantinople did not consider the Trapezuntine emperors to be emperors at all, instead typically referring to them as "princes of the Lazes". However, later in the fourteenth century Trebizond's imperial status was recognized by Constantinople, although only as "Emperor of Trebizond" (βασιλεὺς Τραπεζοῦντος).

Although the Nicene emperors are generally regarded by modern historians to have been the legitimate Byzantine emperors from 1204 to the recapture of Constantinople in 1261, this is only because it was their successor state that eventually retook the city. The emperors in Trebizond and Thessalonica were no less legitimate emperors than those in Nicaea, the distinction only having been made retroactively as the Trapezuntines never succeeded in taking Constantinople and eventually gave up their claim to the Roman title. The line of Komnenos emperors in Trebizond lasted for more than 250 years, far longer than their dynasty had ruled from Constantinople, and outlasted the restored Byzantine Empire under the Palaiologos dynasty by eight years, before it too fell to the Ottoman Empire.

== List of emperors and empresses regnant ==
Portrait	Name	Reign	Succession	Life details
	Alexios I Megas Komnenos; Ἀλέξιος Κομνηνός	March/April 1204 – 1 February 1222 (17 years and 10/11 months) with David I Komnenos (1204–1212)	Grandson of Andronikos I Komnenos (Byzantine emperor 1183–1185). Captured Trebizond with the aid of Tamar of Georgia.	c. 1182 – 1 February 1222 (aged 40) Died of natural causes
	Andronikos I Gidos; Ἀνδρόνικος Κομνηνός Γίδος	1 February 1222 – 1235 (13 years)	Son-in-law of Alexios I, possibly became emperor due to Alexios I's sons all being minors	Unknown – 1235 Died of unrecorded causes
	John I Axouchos; Ἰωάννης Κομνηνός Ἀξούχος (Note: John I used the surname Komnenos Axouchos, possibly to stress matrilineal ancestry from the prominent 12th-century general Alexios Axouch.)	1235 – 1237/1238 (2 or 3 years)	Son of Alexios I	Unknown – 1237/1238 Died while playing polo
	Manuel I Megas Komnenos "the Most Fortunate"; Μανουήλ Κομνηνός	1237/1238 – March 1263 (25 or 26 years)	Son of Alexios I	Unknown – March 1263 Died of natural causes
	Andronikos II Megas Komnenos; Ἀνδρόνικος Κομνηνός	March 1263 – 1266 (3 years)	Son of Manuel I	Shortly before 1240/1242 – 1266 (aged approx. 26) Died of unrecorded causes
	George Megas Komnenos "the Vagabond"; Γεώργιος Μέγας Κομνηνός (Note: George was the first emperor to officially and formally use the name Megas Komnenos (Μέγας Κομνηνός; "grand Komnenos"), previously only a nickname.)	1266 – June 1280 (14 years)	Son of Manuel I	After 1253 – after 1284 Deposed by the Trapezuntine nobility in favor of John II and imprisoned. Later released, attempted to retake the throne in 1284.
	John II Megas Komnenos; Ἰωάννης Μέγας Κομνηνός	June 1280 – 16 August 1297 (17 years and 2 months)	Son of Manuel I	c. 1262/1263 – 16 August 1297 (aged approx. 35) Died of natural causes
	Theodora Megale Komnene; Θεοδώρα Μεγάλη Κομνηνή	Autumn 1284 – 1285 (less than a year)	Daughter of Manuel I, briefly usurped the throne from John II	Between 1242 and 1253 – unknown Fled Trebizond in 1285 and disappears from history thereafter, might have gone into exile in Georgia
	Alexios II Megas Komnenos; Ἀλέξιος Μέγας Κομνηνός Παλαιολόγος (Note: Alexios II used the full surname Megas Komnenos Palaiologos (Μέγας Κομνηνός Παλαιολόγος), stressing both his patrilineal descent from the Komnenoi and his matrilineal descent from the Palaiologoi.)	16 August 1297 – 3 May 1330 (32 years, 8 months and 17 days)	Son of John II	Late 1283 – 3 May 1330 (aged 46) Died of the bubonic plague
	Andronikos III Megas Komnenos; Ἀνδρόνικος Μέγας Κομνηνός	3 May 1330 – 8 January 1332 (1 year, 8 months and 5 days)	Son of Alexios II	Unknown – 8 January 1332 Murdered two of his brothers upon his accession to the throne. Died of the bubonic plague like his father.
	Manuel II Megas Komnenos; Μανουήλ Μέγας Κομνηνός	8 January – 23 September 1332 (8 months and 15 days)	Son of Andronikos III	1323/1324 – 21 February 1333 (aged approx. 9) Deposed by his uncle Basil and was executed a few months later
	Basil Megas Komnenos; Βασίλειος Μέγας Κομνηνός	23 September 1332 – 6 April 1340 (7 years, 6 months and 14 days)	Son of Alexios II, usurped the throne from Manuel II	Unknown – 6 April 1340 Possibly poisoned by his first wife, Irene Palaiologina
	Irene Palaiologina; Εἰρήνη Παλαιολογίνα	6 April 1340 – 17 July 1341 (1 year, 3 months and 11 days)	Widow of Basil, illegitimate daughter of Byzantine emperor Andronikos III Palaiologos. Seized control of the government after Basil's death.	Unknown lifespan Deposed in favor of Anna and sent back to her family in Constantinople, fate thereafter unknown
	Anna Anachoutlou; Ἀννα Μεγάλη Κομνηνή Ἀναχουτλού (Note: For unknown reasons, Anna used the surname Anachoutlou, seemingly of Turkish origin. Perhaps it derived in some way from her Georgian mother, Jiajak Jaqeli.)	17 July 1341 – August/September 1342 (1 year and 1/2 months)	Daughter of Alexios II. Confined to a monastery as a nun, but escaped in 1341 and seized the throne with the aid of the Lazes.	Unknown – 3 September 1342 Deposed in favor of John III and then strangled to death
	John III Megas Komnenos; Ἰωάννης Μέγας Κομνηνός	4 September 1342 – 3 May 1344 (1 year, 7 months and 29 days)	Grandson of John II. Supported as emperor by the army and the Republic of Genoa.	1321/1322 – March 1362 (aged approx. 40) Deposed in favor of his father Michael. Died nearly twenty years later, possibly of the plague.
	Michael Megas Komnenos; Μιχαήλ Μέγας Κομνηνός	3 May 1344 – 13 December 1349 (5 years, 7 months and 10 days)	Son of John II and father of John III, proclaimed emperor after a palace coup against John III	1288/1289 – unknown Forced to abdicate and become a monk. Last attested in 1351 as an exile in Constantinople.
	Alexios III Megas Komnenos; Ἀλέξιος Μέγας Κομνηνός	13 December 1349 – 20 March 1390 (40 years, 3 months and 7 days)	Son of Basil. Exiled to Constantinople after his father's death in 1340. Proclaimed emperor with the support of the Byzantine emperor John VI Kantakouzenos after Michael's deposition.	5 October 1338 – 20 March 1390 (aged 51) The longest-reigning emperor. Died of natural causes.
	Manuel III Megas Komnenos; Μανουήλ Μέγας Κομνηνός	20 March 1390 – 5 March 1417 (26 years, 11 months and 13 days)	Son of Alexios III	16 December 1364 – 5 March 1417 (aged 52) Possibly murdered by his son Alexios IV
	Alexios IV Megas Komnenos; Ἀλέξιος Μέγας Κομνηνός	5 March 1417 – 26 April 1429 (11 years, 11 months and 23 days)	Son of Manuel III; co-emperor since 1395	c. 1379 – 26 April 1429 (aged approx. 50) Assassinated by his son John IV
	John IV Megas Komnenos; Ἰωάννης Μέγας Κομνηνός	26 April 1429 – April 1460 (31 years) with Alexander Megas Komnenos (c. 1451–1459)	Son of Alexios IV	Before 1403 – April 1460 Saw the end of the Byzantine Empire. Died of natural causes
	Alexios V Megas Komnenos; Ἀλέξιος Σκαντάριος Μέγας Κομνηνός	April 1460 (very briefly)	Son of the co-emperor Alexander, a son of Alexios IV	1454 – 1 November 1463 (aged approx. 9) Deposed by his uncle David. Later executed by the Ottomans alongside him.
	David II Megas Komnenos; Δαβίδ Μέγας Κομνηνός	April 1460 – 15 August 1461 (1 year and 3 months)	Son of Alexios IV	c. 1408 – 1 November 1463 (aged approx. 55) Settled in Adrianople in exile after the conquest of Trebizond by the Ottoman Empire. Later accused of treachery and executed.

== Family tree of the Trapezuntine emperors ==
The Megas Komnenos dynasty of Trebizond

Komnenos	Bagrationi Dynasty
Manuel Komnenos; 1145-1185	Rusudan
(?)Theodora Axouchina	Alexios I 1182-1204-1222	David; 1184-1212
Rusudan d. 1247
Andronikos I d.1235 r.1222-1235	Unnamed Daughter	John I d.1238 r.1235-1238
Theodora r.1284-1285
Irene Syrikaina	Manuel I d.1263 r.1238-1263	Anna Xylaloe
Demetre II of Georgia; 1259-1289	Unnamed Daughter	Unnamed Daughter	George; 1255-1266-1280 d. after 1284	Andronikos II c.1240-1263-1266
David VIII of Georgia; 1273-1311	Lasha	Manuel	Eudokia Palaiologina c.1265-1302	John II c.1262-1280-1297
Vakhtang III of Georgia; 1276-1308	Acropolitissa d. c.1341	Michael c.1288-1344-1349 d. after 1355	Alexios II; 1282-1297-1330	Jiajak Jaqeli
Rusudan
John III c.1321-1342-1344-1362	Michael Anachoutlou d. 1330	George Achpougas d. 1330	Anna Anachoutlou d. 1342 r. 1341-1342	Eudokia
Irene Palaiologina b. c.1315 r. 1340-1341	Basil d. 1340 r. 1332-1340	Irene of Trebizond d. c.1382	Andronikos III d. 1332 r. 1330-1332	Unknown wife
Anna	Alexios; 1327-c. 1349	Maria	Qutlugh bin Tur Ali	Theodora	Manuel II c.1324-1333 r. 1332
Theodora Kantakouzene	Alexios III; 1338-1349-1390	Unknown Mistress
?
Basil; 1358-1377	Unnamed Daughter	Suleyman Beg	Unnamed Daughter	Mutahharten	Unnamed Daughter	Qara Osman; 1356-1435
Helena d. 1366	Bagrat V of Georgia d. 1393	Anna b.1357 d. after 1406	Anna Philanthropene	Manuel III; 1364-1390-1417	Gulkhan-Eudokia of Georgia d. 1395	Andronikos; 1355-1376	Eudokia	Tadjeddin
Constantine I of Georgia; 1369-1412 (House of Bagrationi)	David	Tamar	Olympias	Alexios IV; 1382-1417-1429	Theodora Kantakouzene c. 1382-1426	Constantine Dragaš d. 1395
George VII of Georgia d. 1407	David	John VIII Palaiologos; 1392-1448	Maria d. 1439	Alexander	Maria Gattilusio	Unnamed daughter	Jahan Shah b. 1397 or 1405 d. 1467
Maria of Gothia	David c.1408-1460-1461-1463	Alexios V 1454-1460-1463	Daughter of Alexander I of Georgia c.1411-c.1438	John IV c.1403-1429-1460	Daughter of a Turkish sultan
(?)Helena Kantakouzene d. 1463
Uzun Hasan; 1423-1478	Theodora
Mamia Gurieli (House of Gurieli)	Unnamed Daughter	Basil d. 1463	Manuel d. 1463	George d. after 1463
Shaykh Haydar; 1459-1488	Halima Begum
Zagan Pasha d. 1462 or 1469	Anna b. 1447 d. after 1463	Sinan
Sultan Ali Safawi d. 1494	Ismail I 1487-1524 (Safavid dynasty)	Ibrahim Safawi

== See also ==
- List of Trapezuntine usurpers
- List of empresses of the Byzantine successor states – for the consorts of the emperors
- List of Byzantine emperors – for the Byzantine emperors, from whom the Trapezuntine emperors claimed succession
- List of Roman emperors – for a list of emperors beginning with Augustus
- Succession of the Roman Empire – for various claims concerning the succession to the Roman Empire
