= Ripsime (wife of Vakhtang III) =

14th-century Queen of Georgia

Ripsime (Georgian: რიფსიმე) was the wife of Vakhtang III of Georgia (r. 1302–1308).

The 18th-century Georgian Chronicle mentions her as a niece of Chabour. Vakhtang was a son of Demetre II of Georgia (r. 1270–1289). His mother was reportedly daughter to an Emperor of Trebizond, usually identified with Manuel I of Trebizond (r. 1238–1263) for chronological reasons. His maternal grandmother was probably one of the three known wives of Manuel: Anna Xylaloe, Rusudan of Georgia and Irene Syrikaina.

Vakhtang was appointed king at Tbilisi by his overlord Ghazan of the Ilkhanate. The appointment has been dated to 1301 or 1302. He died at Nakhchivan in 1304 (or 1308) after a short period of abdominal pain (French: mal de ventre). They had two known sons:

- Demetre, ruler of Dmanisi.
- Giorgi, ruler of Samshvilde.

Royal titles
Preceded by Princess Surameli	Queen consort of Georgia; 1301/1302–1304/1308	Vacant Title next held by Sindukhtar Jaqeli
