= Siege of Trebizond (1282) =

Medieval siege

- Part of the Byzantine–Georgian wars and Georgia's interventions in Trebizond
Date	April 1282
Location	Trebizond, Pontus 40°59′37″N 39°40′03″E
Result	Trapezuntine victory
Territorial changes	King David Narin failed to take the city, but the Georgians succeeded in annexing the eastern part of the empire.

Belligerents
Empire of Trebizond	Kingdom of Western Georgia

Commanders and leaders
John II of Trebizond	David I of Imereti

The siege of Trebizond (Georgian: ტრაპიზონის ალყა,) in April 1282 was an unsuccessful siege of Trebizond, the capital of the Empire of Trebizond, by the Georgian king David I of Imereti.

== Background ==
In the second half of the 13th century, when the political integrity of Georgia was broken and the state was divided into two kingdoms, Georgian influence in the Empire of Trebizond began to decline, and pro-Byzantine tendencies appeared in separate groups of the ruling circles of Trebizond. This resulted in a struggle for political hegemony in the Empire of Trebizond between the Georgian and Byzantine parties that lasted for years. In 1281, a coup took place in Trebizond, organized by the Georgian party. Emperor John II, who became the son-in-law of the royal house of the Byzantine Palaiologos, was deposed from the throne and even captured. Then he was released from prison, but he was not allowed to stay in Trebizond, and the deposed king went to Constantinople.

== Siege ==
In 1282, during John's absence from Trebizond, his relative, David Narin, tried to restore Georgian influence in the empire, David invaded the empire in April 1282 and captured many provinces (including the historical Chaneti) and besieged the capital. Though King David failed to take the city, the Georgians succeeded in annexing the eastern part of the empire.

== Aftermath ==
In 1284, the Kingdom of Western Georgia helped John's half-sister Theodora, daughter of Manuel I and his second wife Rusudan, and possible niece of David VI, to seize the crown from her half-brother. She became empress for a few months, though soon in 1285 John II returned to the empire and regained power, and Queen Theodora took refuge in Georgia.

== Bibliography ==
- Savvides, Alexios G. K. (2009). Ιστορία της Αυτοκρατορίας των Μεγάλων Κομνηνών της Τραπεζούντας (1204–1461). 2η Έκδοση με προσθήκες [History of the Empire of the Grand Komnenoi of Trebizond (1204–1461). 2nd Edition with additions] (in Greek). Thessaloniki: Kyriakidis Brothers S.A. pp. 70–71. ISBN 978-960-467-121-2.
- Salia, Kalistrat (1980). Histoire de la nation géorgienne. Paris: Édition Nino Salia.
