= Emperor John =

Emperor John may refer to:

== Roman emperors ==
- Joannes (died 425), Western emperor but not recognized by the East

=== Eastern (Byzantine) emperors ===
- John I Tzimiskes
- John II Komnenos
- John III Doukas Vatatzes, in exile
- John IV Laskaris, in exile
- John V Palaiologos
- John VI Kantakouzenos
- John VII Palaiologos
- John VIII Palaiologos

=== Latin emperors ===
- John of Brienne

=== Emperors at Trebizond ===
- John I of Trebizond, Emperor of Trebizond from 1235 to 1238
- John II of Trebizond (c. 1262–August 16, 1297), Emperor of Trebizond from 1280 to 1297
- John III of Trebizond (c. 1321–1362), Emperor of Trebizond
- John IV of Trebizond (c. 1403–1459), Emperor of Trebizond from 1429 to 1459

== Ethiopian emperors ==
- Yohannes I of Ethiopia, Emperor of Ethiopia
- Yohannes II of Ethiopia, Emperor of Ethiopia
- Yohannes III of Ethiopia, Emperor of Ethiopia
- Yohannes IV of Ethiopia, Emperor of Ethiopia

== Russian emperors ==
- Ivan I of Russia, Ivan Danilovich Kalita; numbered with Tsars of Russia but not an emperor
- Ivan II of Russia, Ivan Ivanovich; numbered with Tsars of Russia but not an emperor
- Ivan III of Russia, Ivan Vasilevich; numbered with Tsars of Russia but not an emperor
- Ivan IV of Russia, Ivan Vasilevich, Ivan the Terrible, Tsar of Russia
- Ivan V of Russia, Ivan Alekseievich, Tsar of Russia
- Ivan VI of Russia, Ivan Antonovich, Emperor of Russia

== Bulgarian emperors ==
- Ivan Vladislav of Bulgaria, Emperor of Bulgaria
- Ivan Asen I, Emperor of Bulgaria
- Ivan Asen II, Emperor of Bulgaria
- Ivan Asen III, Emperor of Bulgaria
- Ivan Stephen of Bulgaria, Emperor of Bulgaria
- Ivan Alexander of Bulgaria, Emperor of Bulgaria
- Ivan Shishman of Bulgaria, Emperor of Bulgaria
- Ivan Sratsimir of Bulgaria, Emperor of Bulgaria
