= Andronikos I of Trebizond =

Andronikos I Gidos
- Emperor and Autocrat of the Romans
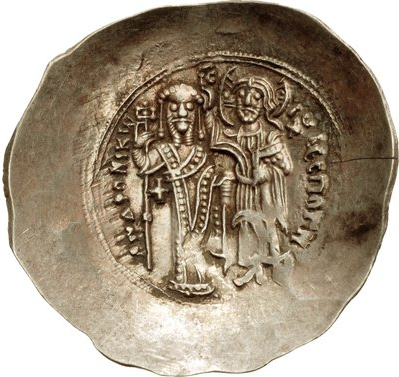
- Aspron trachy possibly minted under Andronikos I Gidos, (Note: This rare issue of coins have in the past also alternatively been attributed to the Byzantine emperor Andronikos I Komnenos (r. 1183–1185), but a Trapezuntine origin under Andronikos I Gidos is supported by isolated coin finds as well as finds of hoards within the borders of the former Empire of Trebizond.) depicting him being crowned by Christ

Emperor of Trebizond Claimant Byzantine Emperor
- Reign: 1222 – 1235
- Predecessor: Alexios I
- Successor: John I
- Died: 1235
- Spouse: A daughter of Alexios I of Trebizond
- Family: Gidos

Andronikos I Gidos (Greek: Ανδρόνικος Κομνηνός Γίδος, romanized: Andronikos Komnēnos Gidos), (Note: Although Andronikos I was not related to the otherwise ruling Komnenos dynasty of Trebizond with the exception of his marriage, his coins nevertheless contain the inscription KOMMNC|OΓΔΩN (i.e. Komnenos Gidos).) Latinized as Andronicus I Gidus or Gidon, was an Emperor of Trebizond (1222–1235). He is the only ruler of Trebizond who was not a blood relative of the founder of that state, Alexios I Megas Komnenos. George Finlay suggests he may be the same Andronikos who was a general of Theodore I Laskaris. During his reign, Trebizond successfully withstood a siege of the city by the Seljuk Turks, and later supported the Khwarazmshah in the latter's unsuccessful battle with the Seljuks.

== Origins ==
The Gidos family appears briefly in Byzantine history at the turn of the 12th/13th century. The etymology of the surname is uncertain, but one view considers it to be from the Greek word for "goat" ('Gida' γίδα f., γίδι), another speculative view suggests that the etymology of the surname may be of Latin origin, and is the hellenized form of the Italian name Guido. This in turn led some scholars to theorize that there may be a connection with the Gidos family and Guy/Guido, a son of the Norman conqueror of southern Italy, Robert Guiscard, who defected to the Byzantine emperor Alexios I Komnenos (ruled 1081–1118) centuries earlier, entered his service and possibly married into the imperial family. Byzantine sources do not treat the family as having a foreign origin and it has not been possible to demonstrate any connection with the son of Robert Guiscard or a Latin origin. W. Hecht casts doubt on a Latin origin of the family.

Apart from the megas domestikos Alexios Gidos, who lived in the 12th century, the only other prominent individual bearing the surname Gidos is an Andronikos Gidos, a general of the Nicaean emperor Theodore I Laskaris, who defeated the Latin allies of David Komnenos (along with his brother Alexios the co-founder of the Empire of Trebizond) in 1206. Finlay first suggested that the general should be identified with the later Trapezuntine emperor, a suggestion adopted by many Byzantine historians, in the words of Anthony Bryer, "for want of any other candidate". Bryer continues, "The name Gidos (Gidon) is sufficiently rare to make the proposal plausible, indeed one wonders whether it was on the way to becoming an epithet in itself," then provides a number of examples of "Gidos" being used in the Pontic region as a synonym for "guardian."

On the death of the Emperor Alexios, control of the empire passed over Alexios' oldest son, John in favor of Andronikos. The steps that led to Andronikos' ascension have not been recorded. Finlay assumes that "the hereditary principle" of succession had not become common practice for the Empire of Trebizond at this point. Although William Miller assumes that John was not old enough to assume the throne, one primary source attests that more than one son was, indeed, old enough to do so: during the siege of Sinope, according to Ibn Bibi, when Kaykaus I told the city that unless they surrendered he would kill Alexios, who was his prisoner, the inhabitants replied that "he has grown sons in Trebizond who are capable of governing. We will elect one of them as our ruler and will not surrender the country to the Turks." Miller describes Andronikos Gidos as "a shrewd man of great experience in warfare". His experience at war served the new-born polity well in facing a serious attack on the capital in 1224.

== Marriage to Komnene ==
Andronikos married a daughter of Alexios I of Trebizond and Theodora Axuchina, whose first name is unknown. Komnene is the female form of "Komnenos," her family name. Her siblings included John I of Trebizond and Manuel I of Trebizond.

== The Seljuks ==
The Seljuk Turks occupied Sudak in the Crimea and constructed a fortress there between 1220 and 1222. In 1223 the Seljuk governor of Sinope sent ships to attack the coast of Trapezuntine Crimea (the so-called Perateia) in an effort to divert trade into his port. A ship carrying the annual tribute of Perateia, with the archon of the province and a number of notables from Cherson on board, was driven by a storm into Sinope's harbour. In violation of a treaty agreed to by the Turks and the Empire of Trebizond in 1220, the city's governor, Hetum, seized the vessel with its cargo, passengers, and crew and also sent a fleet to plunder Perateia. In response, Andronikos assembled a fleet and dispatched it against Sinope. His men plundered up to the walls of the "mart" and killed or captured the crews of the ships lying in the harbour. They rescued the captive archon, his ship and his money, as well as all the plunder carried off from Cherson.

Upon learning of this attack, Sultan Melik marched on Trebizond. In response to the sultan's threat, Andronikos summoned all his troops and fortified the passes leading to the city. The emperor inflicted considerable loss upon the advance guard of the sultan before withdrawing within the walls of the city, which were already accounted impregnable although they did not yet extend to the sea. At this point the siege of the city began.

The sultan made camp near the Monastery of Saint Eugenios, and set fire to the suburbs outside the walls. A string of attacks and counterattacks followed over the next few days (punctuated by a Seljuk embassy being shown the ample stores inside the city) ended with an attempt to storm the walls by night. This last attack failed when a sudden thunderstorm, accompanied by torrential rain and hail, terrified and scattered the besiegers. Some rode over the cliffs in the dark into the ravines, others were caught by swollen torrents from the mountains.

Melik was brought a prisoner to Trebizond, where Andronikos received him with honor. A pact was made between them that in the future the tie of vassalage, which had previously bound Trebizond to Iconium, should cease, and that the Trapezuntines should no longer be obliged either to perform military service to the sultan or to send tribute or gifts. Melik is reported to have been so impressed by this moderation that he performed more than the treaty required by sending an annual present of Arab horses to Andronikos and money to the Monastery of St Eugenios.

== Cult of St Eugenios ==
The siege of 1224 is the source of two early legends of the St Eugenios cult. Fear of the army of Melik is said to have driven many Trapezuntines to the sanctuaries of Panagia Chrysokephalos and church of Saint Eugenios. In the first legend, the account of the siege compiled by John Lazaropoulos, who, under the name of Joseph, was Metropolitan of Trebizond in the second half of the fourteenth century, narrates the legend that a further ruse was perpetrated by the outraged St Eugenios, who appeared to Melik, the profaner of his shrine, in the guise of mayor of the city, who held its keys, and pretended to have been sent by the suffering citizens to invite him to enter. The Sultan's suspicions were calmed by his astrologers, who told him that his entry into the city was written in the stars. In the second, Melik fled, only to fall into the hands of the mountaineers from Matzouka, and 150 years later a shrine erected to St Eugenios still marked the spot of his capture. Traditional accounts of the siege emphasise the sultan's threats to destroy churches, especially the monastery of St Eugenios, even though destroying churches was not usual Seljuk practice. The church of the Panagia Chrysokephalos and St Eugenios both grew richer from the spoils of the siege.

== The Khwarizmshah and the Mongols ==
The independence of Trebizond lasted only until 1230. Jalal-ad-din, the Sultan of Khwarizm, invaded Anatolia in a direct challenge to the Sultanate of Iconium. Jalal-ad-din, who had conquered Georgia in the 1220s, was now a neighbour of Trebizond. Andronikos considered neutrality impossible and made an alliance with the Khwarizmshah, and agreed to war with the Seljuks. Many of Jalal-ad-din's troops, after their defeat at the Battle of Yassıçemen in 1230, sought refuge at Trebizond, that the Trapezuntine contingent had assisted the Shah in that battle.

The alliance with Jalal ad-Din cost Andronikos the loss of the privileges which he had gained in his treaty with Kaykaus. Trebizond once more became a vassal to the Sultan of Iconium. About 1240 Vincent de Beauvais reports the ruler of Trebizond used to send the sultan 200 lances (1,000 men). Nor was this the only loss of this reign.

The Mongols occupied a large part of Georgia. Iberia and Lazica, which had been subject to Trebizond, whose eastern frontier had been Soteropolis, separated themselves from the empire and formed an independent kingdom of Imereti under David VI Narin, son of the Georgian Queen Rusudan.

== Coinage ==
Andronikos is the earliest Emperor of Trebizond whose coins have survived. A number of bronze trachea (also called scyphates) have been identified as having been struck during his reign. These bear the image of the Virgin Mary seated on a throne and holding an icon of the Christ Child—somewhat similar to the obverses of the later aspers of Manuel I—while on the reverse appears an emperor with a forked beard and Christ standing beside him with his hand raised in benediction.

== Sources ==
- Grierson, Philip (1982). Byzantine Coins. Los Angeles: University of California Press. ISBN 0-520-04897-0.
- Kazhdan, Alexander (1991). "Gidos". In Kazhdan, Alexander (ed.). The Oxford Dictionary of Byzantium. New York and Oxford: Oxford University Press. pp. 850–851. ISBN 978-0-19-504652-6.

Andronikos I of Trebizond Grand Komnenoi Born: unknown Died: 1235
Regnal titles
| Preceded by Alexios I | Emperor of Trebizond; 1222–1235 | Succeeded by John I |
