= John I of Trebizond =

Emperor of Trebizond (1235–1238)

John I Axouch
- Emperor and Autocrat of the Romans
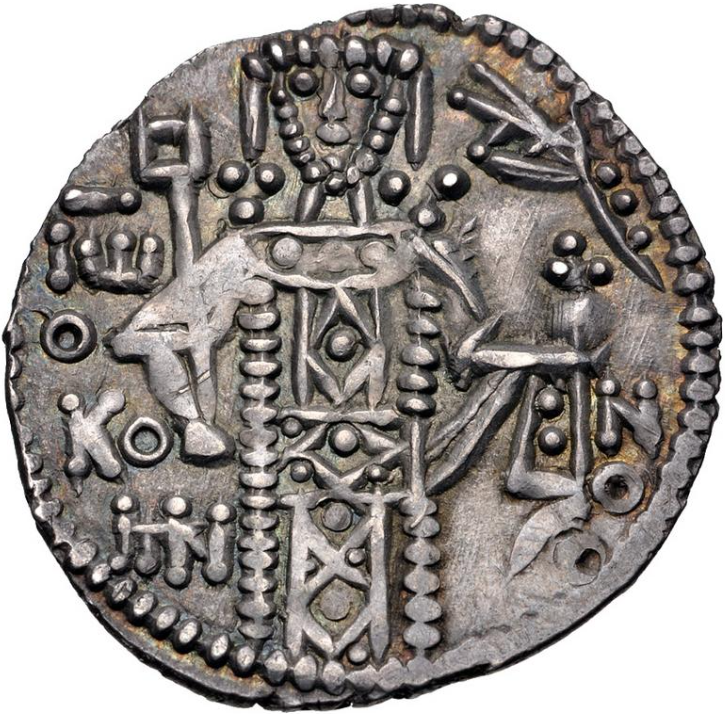
- Coin attributed to John I Axouch

Emperor of Trebizond
- Reign: 1235–1238
- Predecessor: Andronikos I
- Successor: Manuel I
- Died: 1238
- House: Komnenos
- Father: Alexios I
- Mother: possibly Theodora Axouchina

John I Komnenos Axouch (Greek: Ιωάννης Κομνηνός Ἀξούχος, romanized: Iōannēs Komnēnos Axouchos) was the Emperor of Trebizond from 1235 to 1238. One editor reads the text of the chronicle of Michael Panaretos as stating that John ruled six years; although William Miller follows Fallmerayer in assuming this was a mistake for three years, another possible solution is that John was co-ruler with his predecessor Andronikos I Gidos for three years then ruled alone for three more.

== Background ==
He was a member of the Komnenos dynasty based in Trebizond and also probably a descendant of the Axouch, a Turkic Christian family that served the Byzantine empire. The eldest son of Alexios I of Trebizond and a woman the primary sources do not identify; some writers have named her Theodora Axuchina, a relative of John Komnenos the Fat. This Axouch connection was important, further legitimizing the imperial claims of the Trapezuntine rulers — the last male line descendants of the Komnenoi.

Miller suggests that he was perhaps a minor at the time of his father's death in 1222, for his father was succeeded by the throne passed to Alexis' son-in-law, Andronikos I Gidos. During the Siege of Sinope, one of the sources states that Alexios has "grown sons in Trebizond who are capable of governing", so it is clear John was born before 1214.

== Reign and death ==
Little is recorded of John's reign, except that he died while playing tzykanion, a variant of polo fashionable among the Byzantine nobility, when he fell from his horse and was trampled to death. His heir apparent, one Ioannikios, was confined to a monastery, and John's second brother Manuel I ascended the throne. Since Fallmerayer, most historians have assume that Ioannikios was John Axouchos' son, but Panaretos' Chronicle does not state how the two were related. Rustam Shukurov has argued that Ioannikios was the brother of both John and Manuel.

Whether John I issued silver coins, or aspers, is disputed, since some recent authorities believe the coins attributed to him better fit with the aspers struck during John II Megas Komnenos on numismatic grounds.

John I of Trebizond Grand Komnenoi Born: unknown Died: 1238
Regnal titles
Preceded by Andronikos I	Emperor of Trebizond; 1235–1238	Succeeded by Manuel I
