= Andronikos II =

Andronikos II may refer to:

- Andronikos II Palaiologos (1259–1332), Byzantine Emperor
- Andronikos II of Trebizond (c. 1240–1266), Emperor of Trebizond
