= Anna Xylaloe =

Empress consort of Manuel I of Trebizond

Anna Xylaloe (Άννα) was the first Empress consort of Manuel I of Trebizond.

== Name ==
"Xylaloe" is a Greek language term for agarwood, the resinous heartwood from Aquilaria trees, large evergreens native to Southeast Asia. Pedanius Dioscorides mentioned it as an Aloe from the Indian subcontinent, probably a confusion resulting from the similarity in name of the two products.

== Empress ==
She is briefly mentioned in the chronicle of Michael Panaretos. Following the death of Manuel "at his exhortation and choice, his son by the empress the lady Anna Xylaloe, the lord Andronikos Komnenos, succeeded to the throne and reigned for three years. And he died in 6774 [AD 1266]." She is the only one of Manuel's three wives Panaretos gives the title of "Empress".

Anna is assumed to have been the first of three wives of Manuel, married to him c. 1235. Her only known son, Andronikos II of Trebizond, preceded his half-siblings George, Emperor of Trebizond, John II of Trebizond and Theodora of Trebizond on the throne. For this reason Andronikos is considered to have been their elder.

Manuel had at least two daughters whose mother is not mentioned. They could be children by Anna or another of his wives. One of the daughters married Demetre II of Georgia, the other married one of his Didebul. Though mentioned in modern genealogies as a name, "Didebul" was actually a title which Christopher Buyers defines as "non-hereditary noblemen of high rank, senior to aznaur, usually enjoyed by one in state service".

Kuršanskis believes that the Trapezuntine embassy Manuel sent to King Louis IX of France in 1253, asking to marry a daughter of his house, provides a terminus post quem for the death of Anna Xylaloe. When King Louis declined the alliance, Kuršanskis argues Manuel then married Irene Syrikaina.

Royal titles
Preceded by Komnene	Empress consort of Trebizond c. 1238–1240s	Succeeded by Rusudan of Georgia
