= John II of Trebizond =

John II Megas Komnenos
- Emperor and Autocrat of all the East, of the Iberians and of Perateia
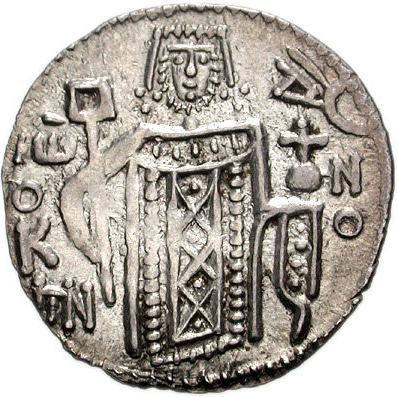
- Coin depicting John II Megas Komnenos

Emperor of Trebizond
- Reign: June 1280 – 16 August 1297 (Briefly deposed by Theodora Megale Komnene 1284–1285)
- Predecessor: George
- Successor: Alexios II
- Died: 16 August 1297; Limnia (modern-day Turkey)
- Burial: Panagia Chrysokephalos Church, Trebizond (modern-day Ortahisar, Trabzon, Turkey)
- Spouse: Eudokia Palaiologina
- Issue: Alexios II Megas Komnenos; Michael Megas Komnenos
- Dynasty: Komnenos
- Father: Manuel I Megas Komnenos
- Mother: Irene Syrikaina

John II Megas Komnenos (Ancient Greek: Ἰωάννης Μέγας Κομνηνός, Iōannēs Megas Komnēnos) (c. 1262 – 16 August 1297) was Emperor of Trebizond from June 1280 to his death in 1297. He was the youngest son of Emperor Manuel I and his third wife, Irene Syrikaina, a Trapezuntine noblewoman. John succeeded to the throne after his full-brother George was betrayed by his archons on the mountain of Taurezion. It was during his reign that the style of the rulers of Trebizond changed; until then, they claimed the traditional title of the Byzantine emperors, "Emperor and Autocrat of the Romans", but from John II on they changed it to "Emperor and Autocrat of all the East, the Iberians, and the Transmarine Provinces", although Iberia had been lost in the reign of Andronikos I Gidos.

John is the first ruler of Trebizond for whom we know more than a few incidents and hints; there is enough information to compose a connected narrative of the first part of his reign. The chronicle of Michael Panaretos, which is often terse and even cryptic, is relatively full for John's reign, and external sources add further details to Panaretos' account. Emperor John II faced many challenges to his rule, which partly explains his marriage to the daughter of the Byzantine emperor Michael VIII Palaiologos.

This insecurity may explain the sole instance where two emperors of Trebizond appear on the coins of this polity: John and his oldest son, Alexios. By associating himself with his son Alexios on these coins, John may be advertising his choice for his successor.

== Life ==
John was born ca. 1262/3, the son of Manuel I (reigned 1238–1263) and his wife, Irene Syrikaina.

John's reign was marked from the beginning with instability. He came to the throne in June 1280, following the betrayal and purported death of his brother George (r. 1266–1280) by his own officials. His first recorded act as Emperor was in 1281, when he received an embassy from Michael VIII Palaiologos (r. 1259–1282) consisting of George Acropolites and a prominent churchman by the name of Xiphilinos; the goal of this mission was to convince John to discontinue using the title of "Emperor and Autocrat of the Romans". Michael had gained the throne of the Empire of Nicaea through a coup against the youthful heir John IV Laskaris some 20 years before, then gained possession of Constantinople itself from the Latin Empire, and based on this achievement Michael believed that only he had the right to this title. This was not the only reason the Byzantine emperor regarded John as a threat: some opponents of Michael's acceptance of union with the Western Church saw John as a viable Orthodox candidate for the imperial throne. Michael considered high-ranking members of the Byzantine aristocracy who refused to embrace the union as threats to his reign, and they were imprisoned, flogged, blinded, or murdered.

Michael had repeatedly petitioned John's predecessors to discontinue using the traditional imperial title. When Acropolites and Xiphilinos presented the invitation of his daughter's hand in return for ceding his ancestral title, John refused this offer. John replied that he was following the precedent set by his predecessors and that the nobility of Trebizond would not allow him to renounce the traditional title.

Once Akropolites left Trebizond, John was faced with a rebellion led by one Papadopoulos, which according to Finlay gained control of the citadel and made John their prisoner. Finlay states that while it is not "possible to establish the complicity of the Byzantine agents in this business", he considers that they likely had a hand in the matter. As Finlay points out, regardless of Michael's possible machinations, "there cannot be a doubt that it [the revolt] was the cause of producing a great change in the views of the emperor of Trebizond and his court".

Following the suppression of Papadopoulos' revolt, a second embassy from Michael arrived at Trebizond, composed of Demetrios Iatropoulos, logothetes ton oikeiakon, and a high ecclesiastic, who offered the bargain once again. This time John agreed to the marriage, but explained it was impossible for him to lay aside the imperial title, which had been borne by his ancestors. "The title of Basileus, the purple boots, the robes embroidered with eagles, and the prostrations of the powerful chiefs of the aristocracy, were dear to the pride of the citizens of Trebizond, and attached them to the person of the emperors." After pledges of sincerity from Michael were made, John agreed to the marriage. However, when he reached Constantinople, his hosts induced him, before he entered the city, to lay aside his purple boots and imperial robes out of respect for Michael Palaiologos—despite the fact his future father-in-law was absent campaigning against the Turks. In exchange for this concession, Michael awarded John with the title of Despot. Michael died before the wedding took place.

While John was away at Constantinople, David VI Narin, the Georgian King of Imereti, besieged the capital. Though King David failed to take the city, the Georgians occupied several provinces. John left for Trebizond on 25 April 1282 with his new wife, Eudokia Palaiologina. Not long after John arrived home, he was confronted by two new threats to his reign. The first was from his full older brother George, who returned to Trebizond and made an unsuccessful attempt to seize the throne. Next was his half-sister Theodora, daughter of Manuel I by his Georgian wife, Rusudan, who apparently deposed him in 1284 to rule for a short time before making a "sudden flight" (in Michael Panaretos' words) from Trebizond; Michel Kuršanskis suggests he may have taken refuge in Tripolis. John was restored to the throne no later than 1285.

Panaretos offers us few details about the remainder of his reign. His account of John's reign—which amounts to three paragraphs—concludes with the statement that it was "during his reign the Turks seized Chalybia and launched a great invasion, so that all those places became uninhabited."

During the 1290s, the Ünye fortress on the western border of the country was built by him.

John died at Limnia in 1297. John Lazaropoulos, in his Logos, notes that when his son Alexios succeeded him, the western part of his realm was under heavy pressure from "the godless Agarenes" and only Kerasous, part of Chalybia, Oinaion, and "the thirteen towns or forts of Limnia" remained to the Empire; John may have been leading his forces against the enemy when he died. His body was transported to his capital and interred in the Panagia Chrysokephalos Church ("Golden-headed" Virgin). Portraits of John and his wife Eudokia could be seen in the church of St. Gregory of Nyssa, prior to its reconstruction in 1863. These portraits were notable that his robes were adorned with the single-headed eagle "the special emblem of the Comneni of Trebizond", while her robes bore the double-headed eagle of Byzantium.

== Foreign policy ==
It was in the later half of John's reign that his Empire attracted attention from the West. For most of the 13th century, Trebizond had not been on the minds of Western leaders: for example, they had played no part in the Council of Lyons in 1274. That changed in the 1290s. Pope Nicholas IV wrote two letters in 1291 inviting John II to convert to Catholicism, join in a new crusade for the recovery of the Holy Land and be Christianity's envoy to the Mongols. The following year an English embassy to the Mongols passed through Trebizond; Anthony Bryer notes John did little for them except lend them "his palace chef to show how the local delicacies of the Empire were cooked." About this time a Genoese colony was established in Trebizond, perhaps as early as 1290, for the English embassy records meeting a merchant of Genoa, Nicolo d'Oria, in Trebizond; he may have been the Genoese consul. Also in the first years of this decade there is evidence that the Franciscans established a convent in Trebizond, which not only served as their base for evangelizing Anatolia, but provided friars to minister to the Genoese in that city.

== Family and succession ==
John II is known to have two sons by Eudokia Palaiologina:

1. Alexios II, who succeeded as emperor
2. Michael

John II of Trebizond Komnenid dynasty Born: c. 1262 Died: 16 August 1297
Regnal titles
Preceded by George	Emperor of Trebizond; 1280–1284	Succeeded by Theodora
Preceded by Theodora	Emperor of Trebizond; 1285–1297	Succeeded by Alexios II
