= David Komnenos =

David I Megas Komnenos
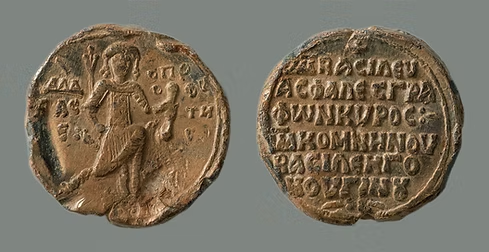
- Seal of David Komnenos.

Emperor of Trebizond Claimant Byzantine Emperor
- Reign: 1204 – 1212 (with Alexios I)
- Successor: Alexios I
- Born: c. 1184
- Died: 1212
- Dynasty: Komnenos
- Father: Manuel Komnenos
- Mother: Rusudan

David Komnenos sometimes enumerated as David I (Greek: Δαβίδ Κομνηνός, Georgian: დავით კომნენოსი; c. 1184 – 1212) was one of the founders of the Empire of Trebizond and its joint ruler together with his brother Alexios until his death. At least two lead seals and an inscription found on a tower in Heraclea Pontica attest that he was the first of his family to use the style Megas Komnenos. Ηe was the son of Manuel Komnenos and grandson of the Emperor Andronikos I.

== Capture of Trebizond ==
David's life is not well-documented; the primary historian for the Empire of Trebizond, Michael Panaretos, fails to mention him even once. Because he was the brother of Alexios, can deduce the names of some of his relatives: Their father was Manuel Komnenos, and their grandfather Byzantine Emperor Andronikos I. Their relative Tamar was queen of Georgia; exactly how David and Tamar were related is not clear. According to Michael Panaretos, Queen Tamar was Alexios' paternal relative (προς πατρός θεὶα); Cyril Toumanoff argued that their grandfather Andronikos had, while in Georgia, married an unnamed sister of king George III. More recently Michel Kuršanskis has argued against Toumanoff's theory, producing evidence that Alexios' mother and/or grandmother were daughters of the houses of Palaiologos or Doukas, yet failing to offer an explanation why Panaretos describes Tamar as Alexios' paternal aunt. Whatever the nature of their relationship, after the death of Emperor Andronikos and their father Manuel, Queen Tamar provided a refuge for the boys at the Georgian court, where presumably they were raised and educated.

In April 1204, while Constantinople was occupied with the on-going conflict with the Fourth Crusade, David and Alexios occupied the city of Trebizond and raised the banner of revolt. Immediately that city, Oinaion and Sinope declared for the two brothers. While Alexios settled down in Trebizond to establish the empire -- earning himself the sneer of being "a proverbial Hylas, called after and not seen" -- David, aided by Georgian troops and local mercenaries, made himself master of Pontus and Paphlagonia, including Kastamonou, said to be the ancestral castle of the Komnenoi. While Alexios collected the allegiance of the fortresses of Tripolis, Kerasus, Mesochaldaion and Jasonis, David advanced westward along the coast from Sinope to the shores of the Sangarios River; the cities of Amastris, Tios and Heraclea Pontica all welcomed him.

== Conquests in the West ==
At this point David encountered another rival for control of the stricken Byzantine Empire: Theodore Laskaris. Laskaris had neutralized rivals along his southern marches—Sabas Asidenos, Manuel Maurozomes, and Theodore Mangaphas, while frustrating the attempts of Henry of Flanders to expand the newly founded Latin Empire into Anatolia. David dispatched his young general Synadenos with some soldiers to occupy the city of Nicomedia, which had been evacuated by the Latin Empire but Laskaris considered part of his domain, the Empire of Nicaea. Theodore Laskaris strategically circled around Synadenos, leading his men through a difficult pass, and fell upon his enemy's flank with complete surprise. Laskaris was prevented from following up this victory and force David's western frontier to recede further eastwards by the timely action of the Latins under Thierri de Loos of seizing Nicomedia. But a Bulgarian invasion of Thrace forced the Latins to withdraw.

For their assistance, David rewarded the Latin Empire with shiploads of grain and hams. Then, considering how Laskaris had encouraged Sultan Kay Khusrau I to besiege Trebizond in 1205 or 1206, David petitioned the Latin Emperor to include him as his subject in his treaties and correspondence with Laskaris, and to treat his land as Latin territory. In the words of William Miller, "It was his interest to prefer a nominal Latin suzerainty to annexation by the Nicaean emperor." Once his position was thus secured, he crossed the Sangarios River with a body of about 300 Frankish auxiliaries, ravaged the villages subject to Laskaris, and took hostages from Plousias. David withdrew, but the Franks, incautiously advancing into the hilly country, were suddenly surprised by Andronikos Gidos, a general of Laskaris, in the Rough Passes of Nicomedia, and scarcely a man of them was left.

In 1208 Laskaris renewed his offensive against David Komnenos at Sangarios River and invested Heraclea Pontica. David responded by sending a messenger to the Latin emperor Henry of Flanders, who begged for help and warned the monarch that if Henry did not help him, David would suffer a serious defeat. Leaving his marshal in Adrianople to finish rebuilding the city, Henry then crossed the Sea of Marmara and occupied Nicomedia, threatening Laskaris' rear, which forced the latter to lift his siege and return to his own territory. Theodore's withdraw was costly, for he lost about 1000 men in crossing the Sangarios, which was in flood. Henry's army might have seized more land in Bithynia, had not an abominably cold winter swept in preventing his troops from advancing any further.

Despite this setback, Theodore did not abandon his attempts on Paphlagonia. Following the Seljuk defeat at Antioch on the Meander, he concluded a treaty with the new Seljuk Sultan, Kaykaus I, and together they encroached on the Trapezuntine territory. According to the panegyric of Niketas Choniates, there was no resistance to Theodore's incursions, and Theodore eventually captured Heraclea Pontica and Amastris. Here lose sight of David; what exactly happened to David over the next few years is unknown. Vassiliev commented that the lack of reference to David Komnenos in the Treaty of Nymphaeum was evidence that his former suzerain had no further use for him and abandoned him in order to gain a peace with Theodore. Had Laskaris captured him, it would probably have been recorded in the histories. Earlier scholars, beginning with Jakob Philipp Fallmerayer, had placed the death of David during the siege of Sinope in 1214. It seems likely that David might have fled to the Latin emperor. As mentioned above, Michael Panaretos never mentions David, so he provides no help answering that question. More recently the truth of his fate was rediscovered: a marginal note written at Mount Athos records David died as a monk of Vatopedi monastery on 13 December 1212. But this evidence raises more questions than it answers, such as how he came to reside there.

Shukurov looks for the answer in Panaretos' silence, which he believes was intentional and therefore significant: David somehow disgraced himself and was confined to Vatopedi by Alexios. A clue to his offense may lie in William Miller's observation above referring to David's suzerainty to the Emperor of the Latin Empire, a hated enemy of Byzantines. Despite the attested flexibility of Byzantine ideology, his submission might have been too much for his brother to tolerate, and it was this that led to his downfall and confinement.
