= Dionysodorus of Amisene =

Ancient Greek mathematician (1st century AD)

Dionysodorus of Amisene (1st century AD) was a Greek mathematician from Pontus, now on the Black Sea coast of Turkey. He was briefly described by Strabo, as one of the learned men of the city of Amisus. Despite the similarity of his demonym to the inland city of Amaseia, where Strabo was born, translators H. C. Hamilton and W. Falconer instead footnote Amisus as being the modern city Samsun, near Amaseia on the coast. Amisene is a name for the region containing both cities.

Strabo distinguishes him from Dionysodorus of Melos, a geometer, whom Pliny the Elder describes as having calculated the circumference of the Earth, less accurately than the older calculation of Eratosthenes. He should also be distinguished from Dionysodorus of Caunus, who studied conic sections.

Dionysodorus of Amisene was long thought to be the Dionysodorus who studied conic sections until, in the early 20th century, Wilhelm Crönert found from a papyrus newly excavated at Herculaneum a connection from the study of conics to Dionysodorus of Caunus and his son, also named Dionysodorus, dating them to centuries before the time that Strabo wrote about.
