= Theodora of Trebizond =

Theodora Megale Komnene
- Empress and Autocrat of all the East, of the Iberians and of Perateia
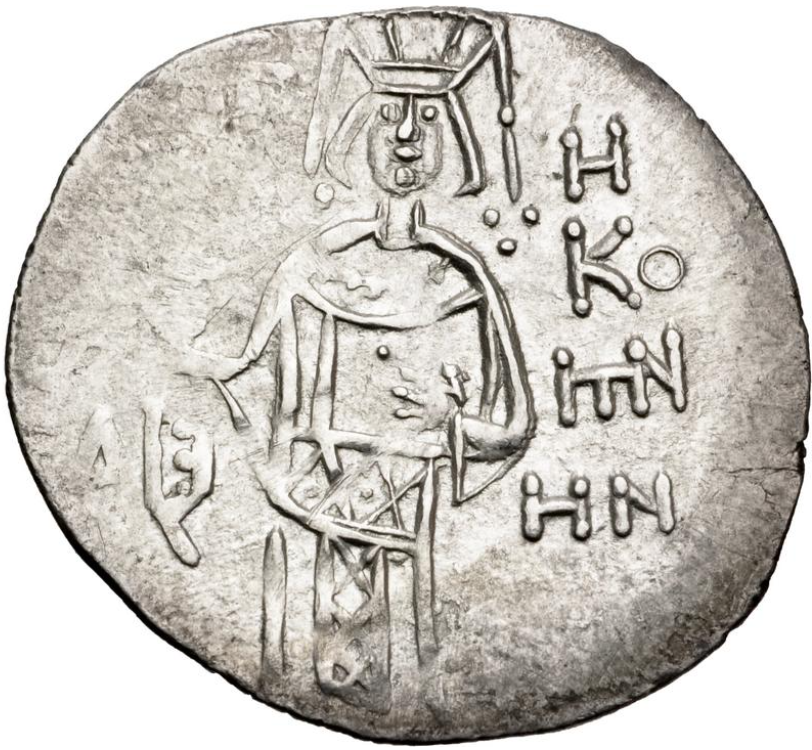
- Coin of Theodora, minted c. 1285

Empress of Trebizond
- Reign: 1284–1285
- Predecessor: John II
- Successor: John II
- Dynasty: Komnenos
- Father: Manuel I Megas Komnenos
- Mother: Rusudan of Georgia

Theodora Megale Komnene (Greek: Θεοδώρα Μεγάλη Κομνηνή, Theodōra Megalē Komnēnē), (before 1253– after 1285), was Empress of Trebizond from 1284 to 1285. All Michael Panaretos tells us about her is that she was a daughter of Emperor Manuel I of Trebizond by Rusudan, a Georgian princess. Although some consider her Manuel's second wife, Michel Kuršanskis has argued that Rusudan may have been simply his mistress. Kuršanskis also notes that the evidence is insufficient to determine if Theodora was identical with one of the princesses of Trebizond mentioned in the Chronicle of Bishop Stephanos who married a noble or the king of Georgia, or if she had been a nun — much as Anna Anachoutlou was before her usurpation in the following century.

In 1284, with the help of Georgian King of Imereti, David VI Narin she managed to seize the crown from her half-brother, Emperor John II. John II may have taken refuge in Tripolis. Shortly afterwards she was defeated and John regained his throne, but she had managed to reign long enough to have minted her own coins. A few types of silver aspers and bronze nomismas are evidence that she was the only Empress of Trebizond to have coined money. After John's restoration, she went into exile in Georgia, the homeland of her mother.

Theodora of Trebizond Komnenid dynasty Born: unknown Died: unknown
Regnal titles
Preceded by John II	Empress regnant of Trebizond; 1284–1285	Succeeded by John II
