= Diana Anphimiadi =

Georgian writer

- დიანა ანფიმიადი
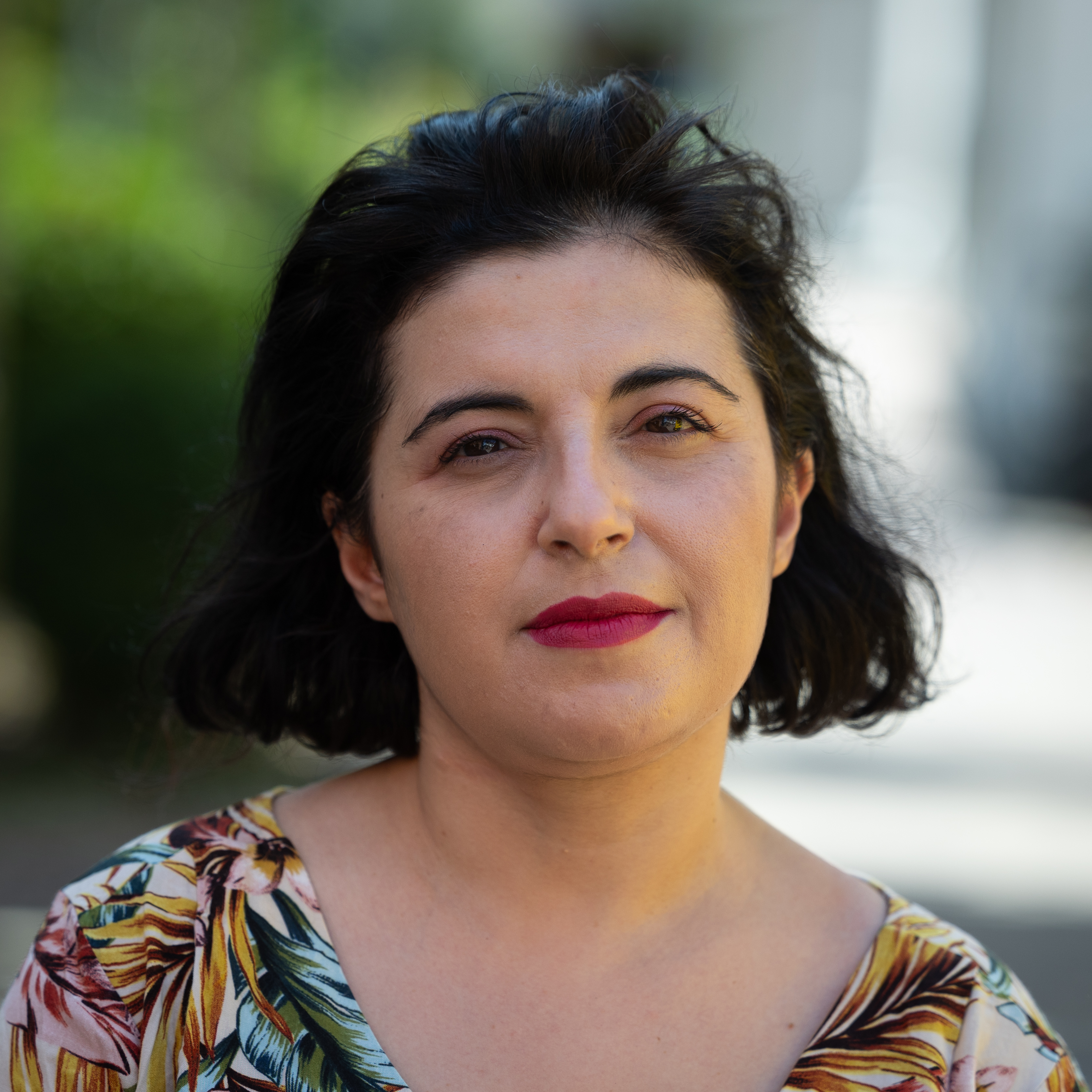
- Diana Anphimiadi at the Hausacher Leselenz 2023
- Born: July 28, 1982 (age 44); Tbilisi, Georgian SSR, Soviet Union
- Education: Ivane Javakhishvili Tbilisi State University
- Occupation: Poet
- Children: 2
- Writing career
- Language: Georgian
- Years active: 2008–present

Diana Anphimiadi (Georgian: დიანა ანფიმიადი, also Romanized Anpimiadi, Anfimiadi; born July 28, 1982) is a Georgian poet, journalist, publicist, linguist and teacher.

== Early life ==
Anphimiadi was born in Tbilisi on July 28, 1982. She has Pontic Greek ancestry. She attended Ivane Javakhishvili Tbilisi State University, studying the Georgian languages, and later received a Master's in linguistics.

== Career ==
Anphimiadi released her first work in 2008, winning first prize in the 2008 Tsero (Crane) literary contest and the Saba literary award for best first collection. As well as several poetry collections, she published a selection of stories, memories and recipes in 2012, entitled Personal Cuisine.

A chapbook of her work was published in 2018 in English, and a full collection of her work (Why I No Longer Write Poems) in 2022 by Bloodaxe Books. According to her publisher, "Her award-winning work reflects an exceptionally curious mind and glides between classical allusions and surreal imagery. She revivifies ancient myths and tests the reality of our senses against the limits of sense. Boldly inventive, prayers appear alongside recipes, dance lessons next to definitions. Her playful, witty lyricism offers a glimpse of the eternal in the everyday." In The Guardian, Fiona Sampson called it "gorgeous, fabulising verse." Why I No Longer Write Poems won a PEN Translates Award.

In 2021, some of her poetry was published in French translation as part of an anthology of Georgian women's poetry.

== Bibliography ==
=== Poetry ===
In Georgian:

- შოკოლადი shok’oladi ("Chocolate", 2008)
- კონსპექტური მითოლოგია k’onsp’ekt’uri mitologia ("Resumé of Mythology", 2009)
- ახლოხედვის ტრაექტორია akhlokhedvis t’raekt’oria ("Trajectory of the Short-Sighted", 2012)
- ჩრდილის ამოჭრა chrdilis amoch’ra ("Cutting the Shadow", 2015)

Parallel English and Georgian: (both translated by Natalia Bukia-Peters and Jean Sprackland)

- Beginning to Speak (2018)
- Why I No Longer Write Poems (2022)

=== Prose ===
- პირადი კულინარია p’iradi k’ulinaria ("Personal Cuisine", 2012)

== Personal life ==
Anphimiadi lives in Tbilisi. She is currently preparing a doctoral dissertation at Ivane Javakhishvili Tbilisi State University.
