= Eudokia Palaiologina =

Empress of Trebizond

Eudokia Palaiologina (Greek: Ευδοκία Παλαιολογίνα) (c. 1265 – 18 September 1302) was the third daughter of Byzantine Emperor Michael VIII Palaiologos and his wife, Theodora, a grandniece of Emperor John III Doukas Vatatzes of Nicaea.

In 1282, Eudokia married in Constantinople John II Megas Komnenos, Emperor of Trebizond with whom she had two sons, Alexios and Michael. In 1298, after her husband's death and the ascension of her son Alexios II, she returned to her brother's court at Constantinople taking her younger son Michael with her.

Andronikos II Palaiologos received his sister, planning to use her to seal a diplomatic settlement with Stefan Uroš II Milutin, King of Serbia: the hand of Eudokia in return for a negotiated peace. King Stefan was agreeable to this proposal, for one of his three wives had recently died. "But nothing that Andronikos could do would influence his sister to entertain the prospect of life with a lecherous barbarian in the wilds of Serbia," writes Donald M. Nicol. King Stefan was forced to settle for Andronikos' daughter Simonida by his second wife, Irene of Montferrat.

Meanwhile, Alexios II decided for himself to marry Djiadjak Jaqeli, a Georgian princess. His uncle Andronikos II, who had been appointed his guardian by his father, wanted this marriage annulled; he had planned for Alexios to marry the daughter of the high court official Nikephoros Choumnos. Eudokia used the pretext of inducing her son to dissolve the marriage to obtain her brother's permission to return to Trebizond in 1301; upon arriving, she instead advised her son to keep his Georgian wife. Eudokia died in the following year, and William Miller speculates she was buried in the church of Saint Gregory of Nyssa.

Anthony Bryer has proposed that a Eudokia, who became a nun by the monastic name Euphemia, mentioned in a painted inscription recorded by Fallmerayer from the Panagia Theoskepastos Monastery, may have been Eudokia Palaologina. This Eudokia has not been satisfactorily proven to be a member of the house of the Great Komnenoi, and Bryer offers a number of objections to any identification. He notes that there is "a strong independent local nineteenth-century tradition" that Eudokia founded the church of St. Gregory of Nyssa before her death. Lastly, Bryer notes that "it would not be surprising if she would have wished to put not only distance but a nun's veil between herself and her brother's ruthless and alarming marital plans (which included Mongol and Turkish alliances for other female members of his family) before she died in 1302."

Royal titles
| Preceded by Irene Syrikaina | Empress consort of Trebizond; 1282–1284 | Succeeded by Herself in the second reign of her husband |
| Preceded by Herself in the first reign of her husband | Empress consort of Trebizond; 1285–1297 | Succeeded by Djiadjak Jaqeli |
