= Demetrios Iatropoulos =

Demetrios Iatropoulos (Greek: ∆ημήτριος Ἰατρόπουλος; fl. 1260–95) was a senior Byzantine official of the late 13th century. He served as logothetes ton oikeiakon from 1260 until 1295, when he was promoted to protasekretis. He took part in the 1273 synod in Constantinople against patriarch John XI Bekkos, and is mentioned in 1281/2 as leading an embassy to the Empire of Trebizond.

== Sources ==
- Trapp, Erich; Walther, Rainer; Beyer, Hans-Veit; Sturm-Schnabl, Katja (1980). "7968. Ἰατρόπουλος ∆ημήτριος". Prosopographisches Lexikon der Palaiologenzeit (in German). Vol. 4. Vienna: Verlag der Österreichischen Akademie der Wissenschaften. ISBN 3-7001-3003-1.
