= Andronikos II of Trebizond =

Andronikos II Megas Komnenos
- Emperor and Autocrat of the Romans

Emperor of Trebizond Claimant Byzantine Emperor
- Reign: March 1263 – 1266
- Predecessor: Manuel I
- Successor: George
- Born: 1240
- Died: 1266 (aged 25–26)
- Dynasty: Komnenos
- Father: Manuel I
- Mother: Anna Xylaloe

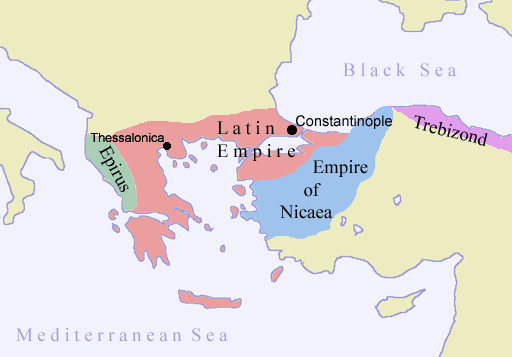
Trebizond in 1204 (Purple)

Andronikos II Megas Komnenos (Greek: Ανδρόνικος Κομνηνός; (Note: The style Megas Komnenos ("grand Komnenos"), commonly applied to all the Trapezuntine Komnenos emperors by modern historians, began as a nickname and was not formally used in an official capacity until the reign of Andronikos II's successor George.) 1240 – 1266), or Andronicus II Grand Comnenus, was the Emperor of Trebizond from 1263 to 1266. Despite being the designated successor of his father Manuel I, Andronikos' tenure was short due to premature death from unrecorded causes. The major event of his reign was the definitive loss of Sinope to the Seljuk Turks under the regency of Mu'in al-Din Suleyman, also known as the Pervane, in the summer or fall of 1265. The capture of Sinope by the Turks gave them the best port on the Black Sea, allowing them to create a navy and compete with the Trapezuntines for influence in the Black Sea.

Andronikos was the eldest son of Manuel Komnenos by his first wife, Anna Xylaloe, a Trapezuntine noblewoman. According to the chronicler Michael Panaretos, "And so, his son by lady Anna Xylaloe, the lord Andronikos II Komnenos, whom Manuel had urged and selected to take the throne, became emperor and reigned for three years. And he died in 1265/1266." In his list of the Emperors before Alexios II, Constantine Loukites fails to mention Andronikos. N. Oikonomides speculates that Loukites omitted Andronikos from his list because the Emperor was excluded from the official gallery of Emperors of Trebizond.

Little more is known of his brief reign. Trebizond continued to flourish as a trading center — two merchants from Marseille were there in 1263 and 1264 carrying a letter of introduction from Charles of Anjou, Count of Provence.

== Notes ==
Andronikos II of Trebizond Komnenid dynasty Born: c. 1240 Died: 1266
Regnal titles
Preceded by Manuel I	Emperor of Trebizond; 1263–1266	Succeeded by George
