= Irene Syrikaina =

Irene Syrikaina (Greek: Εἰρήνη Συρίκαινα) was the third Empress-consort of Manuel I of Trebizond. She may be the same Irene Syrikaina whom Michael Panaretos mentions was stoned to death in September 1332 in the purges that followed Basil Megas Komnenos's accession to the throne.

== Name ==
The male form of her family name has been suggested being either "Syrikainos" or "Syrikos". The name may be related to the island Syros or to the terms "Syrios", "Syrikos", "Syriakos", all Greek language for Syrian. The geographic term Syria also applied to Coele-Syria and Transjordan.

== Empress ==
Irene is briefly mentioned in the chronicle of Michael Panaretos: "And the son of lord Manuel by the lady Irene Syrikaina, the lord George Komnenos, succeeded to the throne and reigned for fourteen years" This indicates that she was the mother of George, Emperor of Trebizond and John II of Trebizond, presumed to have been the youngest sons of Manuel. Michel Kuršanskis has argued that Irene married Manuel some time after 1253, the year Manuel sent envoys to King Louis IX of France, who was then at Sidon after his defeat at the Battle of Fariskur, seeking to marry a daughter of his house. This diplomatic visit would be best explained by Manuel's need for a wife, and when King Louis declined to offer him a daughter, Manuel subsequently married Irene.

Manuel had at least two daughters whose mother is not mentioned. They could be children by Irene or another of his wives. One of the daughters married Demetre II of Georgia, the other married one of his Didebul. Though mentioned in modern genealogies as a name, "Didebul" was actually a title. According to "The Bagrationi (Bagration) Dynasty" by Christopher Buyers, the Didebul were "non-hereditary noblemen of high rank, senior to aznaur, usually enjoyed by one in state service".

Panaretos records that Manuel died in March, 1263. He was succeeded by Andronikos II of Trebizond, his only known son by Anna Xylaloe, his first wife. Based on a passage in the Georgian "Annals of Sebastian", Anthony Bryer has argued that Irene Syrikaina played a role in the deposition of her son George (who became Emperor in 1266 on the death of his half brother Andronikos), and thus was still alive June 1280.

Royal titles
Preceded by Rusudan of Georgia	Empress consort of Trebizond c. 1250s – 1263	Succeeded by Eudokia Palaiologina
