= Saint Gregory of Nyssa Church, Trabzon =

Church building in Trabzon, Turkey

Coordinates: 41°00′34″N 39°43′50″E

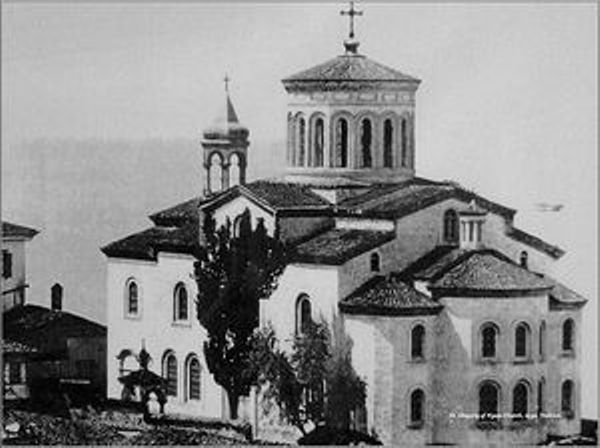
Saint Gregory of Nyssa cathedral c. 1900.

Saint Gregory of Nyssa (Greek: Εκκλησία Αγίου Γρηγορίου Νύσσης Ekklesia Agiou Grigoriou Nyssas) was a church and monastery of Trabzon. It's believed the church was built around 1280-1297 by the wife of John III, Emperor of Trabzon. After 1665, St Gregory became the cathedral of the city of Trabzon. The church was dedicated to Saint Gregory of Nyssa (c. 330–395), a Christian bishop and saint. Nyssa (current day Nevşehir) is a city located in Cappadocia. Georgian traveler Timote Gabashvili visited the church in the late 1750s and included this event in his writings. In 1863, the Metropolitan Constantius of Trabzon rebuilt the church.

It was used as a church from the middle ages until the Greco-Turkish population exchange after 1922. Then in 1930, the church was dynamited to make way for the City Club.
