= Manuel I of Trebizond =

Manuel I Megas Komnenos
- Emperor and Autocrat of the Romans
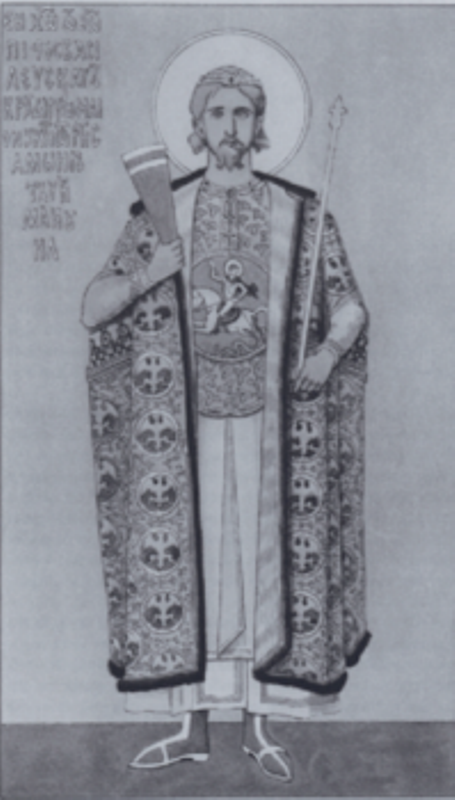
- Fresco from Hagia Sophia depicting Emperor Manuel I Megas Komnenos

Emperor of Trebizond
- Reign: 1238 – March 1263
- Predecessor: John I
- Successor: Andronikos II
- Died: 1263
- Spouse: Anna Xylaloe; Rusudan of Georgia; Irene Syrikaina
- Issue: Andronikos II Komnenos; Theodora Megale Komnene; George Megas Komnenos; John II Megas Komnenos
- Dynasty: Komnenos
- Father: Alexios I
- Mother: Theodora Axouchina

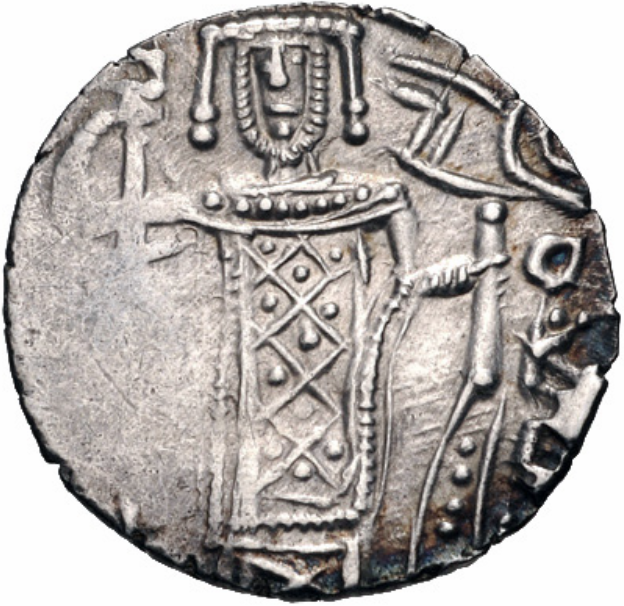
Silver asper of Manuel I

Manuel I Megas Komnenos (Greek: Μανουὴλ Κομνηνός; (Note: The style Megas Komnenos ("grand Komnenos"), commonly applied to all the Trapezuntine Komnenos emperors by modern historians, began as a nickname and was not formally used in an official capacity until the reign of Manuel I's son George.) died March 1263) was the Emperor of Trebizond from 1238 until his death. He was the son of Emperor Alexios I and his wife, Theodora. At the time Manuel reigned, the Empire of Trebizond comprised a band of territory stretching along the southern coast of the Black Sea. Although Michael Panaretos, a 14th-century Trapezuntine chronicler, calls Manuel "the greatest general and the most fortunate" and states he ruled "virtuously in the eyes of God", the only event he documents for Manuel's reign is a catastrophic fire striking the city of Trebizond in January 1253. The major events of his reign are known from external sources, most important of which is the recovery of Sinope in 1254, which had been lost to the Sultanate of Rum forty years before.

== Manuel and the Mongols ==
In 1243, a Trapezuntine army is recorded as assisting the Seljuk Turks, along with a detachment from the Nicaean Empire, against the Mongols of Persia at the Battle of Köse Dağ. Despite this, the Seljuk forces were shattered, and both the Seljuks and their allies had to settle their own submission to the victorious Mongols. Manuel visited in person the court of the Great Khan Güyük as early as 1246; this was an important act, as Rustam Shukurov notes, for the personal visit of a vassal ruler to the Khan’s camp was regarded as an indispensable ceremony; it brought these persons into the "family" of the Great Khan. "Seljuk Anatolia was under tight Mongol control," Shukurov writes. "Any serious change in social and political life (including appointments to key offices) required Mongol approval and sanction, which was embodied, in particular, in yarlighs."

On 24 June 1254, Manuel recaptured Sinope, and made Ghadras archon of the Black Sea port. Kurškanskis suggests that Manuel had obtained a yarligh prior to this attack, although he admits doing so would have been inconsistent with the practices of the Trapezuntine emperors. For the years Manuel held this port, the Seljuk Turks were landlocked, making Trebizond once again the major naval power in the Black Sea.

Shukurov argues with Kurškanskis that Manuel had been given a yarligh by the Ilkhanite Mongols to recover Sinope, and argues further that it was done to embarrass the Golden Horde, who were the masters of the Seljuk Turks; the governor of Sinope at the time Manuel captured the port was ra’is al-bahr Shuja al-Din 'Abd al-Rahman, the Seljuk naval commander-in-chief, who had taken part in the Seljuk embassy to Batu Khan, ruler of the Golden Horde in 1253, where he received Batu's yarligh investing him with the office of na'ib. A few years later, in October 1256, one of the three brothers who inherited the Seljuk Sultanate of Rum, Kaykaus II, was defeated by Baiju and fled to sanctuary in the Nicaean Empire, moving Anatolia from the sphere the Golden Horde controlled firmly into the Ilkhanite.

Manuel Megas Komnenos died in March 1263, having "recommended and chosen"—to use Panaretos' words—his oldest son Andronikos as his successor.

== Embassy to Louis IX of France ==
In 1253, Manuel sent envoys to King Louis IX of France, who was then at Sidon after his defeat at the Battle of Fariskur, seeking to marry a daughter of his house. "The King had no French princesses with him on the crusade," writes William Miller, "but recommended Manuel to make a matrimonial alliance with the Latin Empire of Constantinople, to which the aid of 'so great and rich a man' would be useful against Vatatzes, the Greek Emperor of Nicaea." Jean de Joinville testifies to Manuel's wealth, stating he sent Louis "a present of various jewels, and also, among other things, some bows made of cornel-wood. The notches for the shafts were screwed into the bows, and when these shafts were loosed, you could see they were very sharp and well-made."

Although Miller fails to offer a reason for Manuel's overtures to King Louis, two more recent writers have, and these are not exclusive. Kuršanskis has pointed out that the timing of the embassy would make sense if his first wife, a Trapezuntine noblewoman Anna Xylaloe, had died before that year and thought a matrimonial alliance with the French king was desirable; and after Louis sent his regrets, Manuel wed Irene Syrikaina. If this is correct, it provides a badly needed anchor point in the chronology of Manuel's Life. The other possible reason was suggested by Rustam Shukurov: it is well known that Manuel's Mongol overlords were favorable towards Christianity, and perhaps Manuel was encouraged by this favor to seek a connection with the "undisputed head of the crusader movement and indefatigable warrior against Islam."

== Manuel's coinage ==
Manuel's reign is notable for being the first Emperor of Trebizond to issue large numbers of coins. This is important for two reasons: the first is that issuing coins in a precious metal, such as silver or gold, is commonly considered a demonstration of sovereignty by a ruler; the second is that the volume of coins issued by a ruler is frequently used as an indicator of economic activity. Although some copper scyphates have been identified as coming from Andronikos I Gidos' mint, according to Otto Retowski over 200 types of silver aspers—the characteristic coin of the Empire—were struck then, more than any other ruler of Trebizond, in addition to other silver and bronze currency. (John II is a distant second, having struck around 138 types of aspers during his reign.) Trapezuntine coins circulated widely outside the empire, especially in Georgia. His coins became so common there that his name became the generic word in Georgian for money; kirmaneoul is derived from "kuros' Manuel" or "Caesar Manuel".

The cause of this sudden explosion in the volume of currency is not clearly known. Certainly not all of them came from Manuel's silversmiths. Both Wroth and Retowski identified a number of coins minted as imitations in Georgia to meet demand there. Michel Kuršanskis has suggested some of these types were struck during the reigns of Manuel's successors—Andronikos and George—because their Mongol overlords forbade them from minting silver coins in their own names. Nevertheless, this leaves the vast majority of the coins with his name on them as being struck during his reign.

Some writers attribute this large number of aspers to a change in the route of the Silk Road during Manuel's reign. The destruction of Baghdad by Hulagu Khan in 1258 revived the trade route running north from Armenia and the upper Euphrates valley to Erzerum and then through the Zigana Pass to Trebizond, instead of to the Mediterranean. However, Anthony Bryer has pointed out the volume of trade carried on this route was minuscule, and taxes and duties extracted from the goods passing through Trebizond (known as the kommerkion) would at most have been 30% of the Empire's total revenues in a busy year, and more often 6%. Another author has pointed out that the silver mines in the region of Gümüşhane were within the borders of the Empire of Trebizond during the 13th century, and could provide the raw material for these coins; but further investigation has shown that these silver mines were not heavily exploited before the 18th century. Kuršanskis has suggested that these coins represent the tribute extracted by the dominant Mongols of Persia, although this does not explain the care taken in minting all of these coins: most of this tribute would, following its delivery to the Mongol overlords, have been melted down and either used to produce other coins or jewelry.

== Legacy ==
Manuel rebuilt the Hagia Sophia monastery in Trebizond between 1250 and 1260. Eastmond describes Manuel's church as "the finest surviving Byzantine imperial monument of its period." When Michael VIII Palaiologos recaptured Constantinople from the Latin Empire in 1261 he unsuccessfully demanded that Manuel abandon his claim to the title of "Emperor and Autocrat of the Romans", the one commonly used by the Byzantine Emperors.

== Family and succession ==
Manuel was the second son of Alexios I, the first emperor of Trebizond; his older brother, John I Axouchos, was his predecessor as Emperor. During the Siege of Sinope, one of the sources states that Alexios has "grown sons in Trebizond who are capable of governing", so it is likely that Manuel was born before 1214.

Manuel had children by three different women; four of his children reigned after him. Older scholars, like Miller and Finlay, assumed all three women were his wives, but more recently Michel Kuršanskis has argued that only two were his wives, and that Rusudan of Georgia was simply his mistress.

By his first wife, Anna Xylaloe, a Trapezuntine noblewoman he had:

- Andronikos II, who succeeded as emperor.

By Rusudan of Georgia, he had:

- Theodora

By his Irene Syrikaina, his last wife and another Trapezuntine noblewoman, he had four known children:

- George, later Emperor
- Anonymous daughter, who married King Demetre II of Georgia
- Anonymous daughter
- John II, later Emperor

== Notes ==
Manuel I of Trebizond Komnenid dynasty Born: c. 1218 Died: March 1263
Regnal titles
| Preceded by John I | Emperor of Trebizond; 1238–1263 | Succeeded by Andronikos II |
