= Tripolis (Pontus) =

Ancient Greek city in the Pontus region of Turkey

Coordinates: 41°00′09″N 38°49′10″E

Tripolis (Ancient Greek: Τρίπολις), formerly Ischopolis (Ἰσχόπολις), was an ancient fortress city in Pontus Polemoniacus (aka the Pontus region), on a river of the same name, and with a tolerably good harbour; it is now the site and namesake of the city of Tirebolu in Giresun Province, Black Sea Region, Turkey. It belonged to the Mossynoeci and was situated at a distance of 18 km (11 mi) east from Cape Zephyrium. The place is situated on a rocky headland.
