= Siege of Sinope =

1214 Seljuk victory over Trebizond

- Part of the Byzantine–Seljuq wars
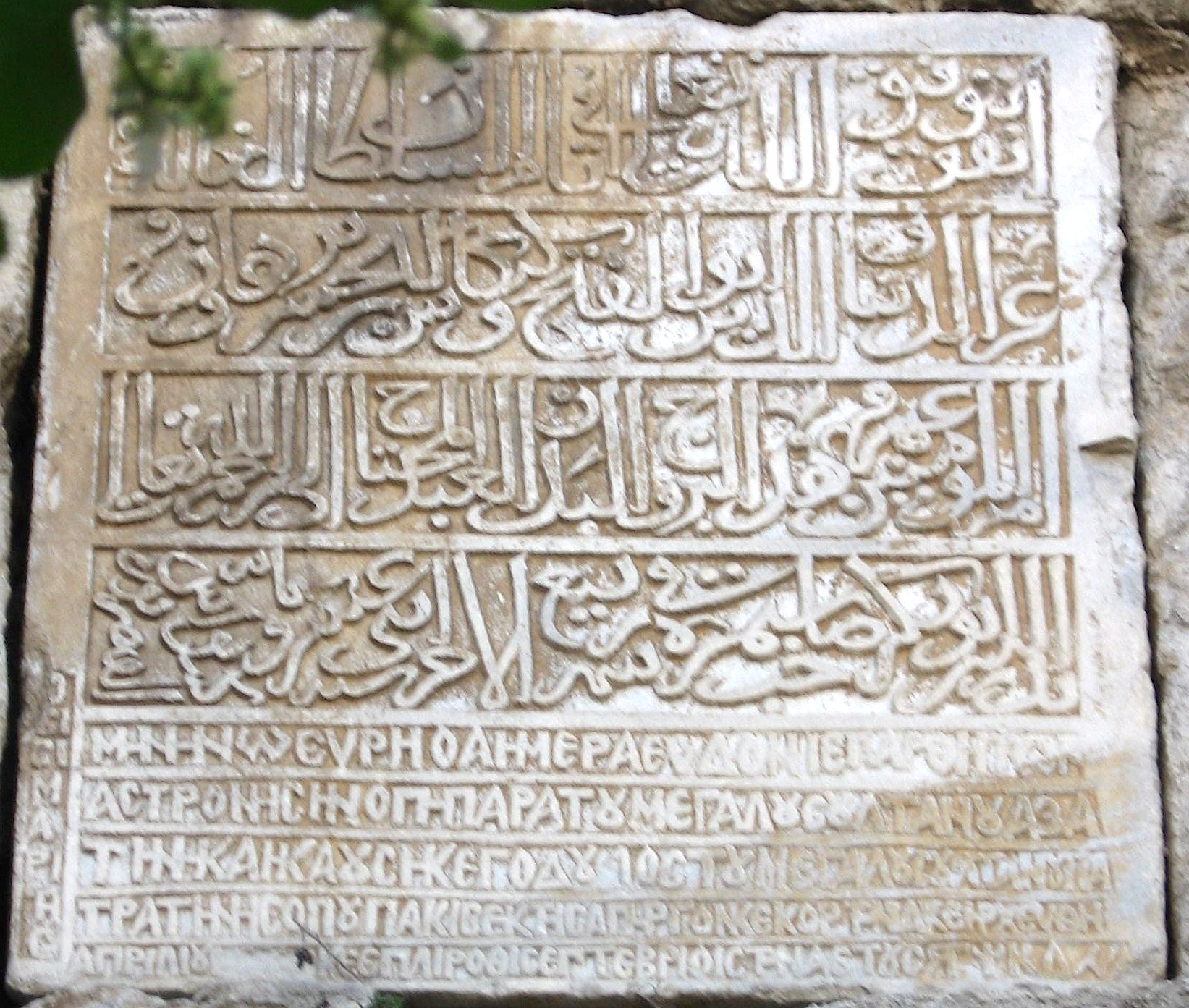
- Bilingual inscription (Arabic and Greek) of Kaykaus I on the walls of Sinope
Date	1 November 1214
Location	Sinope, Asia Minor
Result	Seljuk victory

Belligerents
Empire of Trebizond	Sultanate of Rum

Commanders and leaders
Alexios I of Trebizond (POW)	Kaykaus I

The siege of Sinope in 1214 was a successful siege and capture of the city by the Sultanate of Rum under their Sultan, Kaykaus I (r. 1211–1220). Sinope was an important port on the Black Sea coast of Anatolia, at the time held by the Empire of Trebizond, one of the Byzantine Greek successor states formed after the Fourth Crusade. The siege is described in some detail by the near-contemporary Seljuq chronicler Ibn Bibi. The Trapezuntine emperor Alexios I (r. 1204–1222) led an army to break the siege, but he was defeated and captured, and the city surrendered on 1 November.

== Overview ==
According to Ibn Bibi's account, Kaykaus I embarked on the conquest after receiving reports from the frontier that Alexios' troops had been violating Seljuq territory. Upon this, he and his beys gathered those who had been to Sinope and drew up a plan for the conquest, deciding that a long siege would be required. However, a group of scouts (or, according to another version of the story, nomads) captured Alexios when he was hunting with a company of 500 men. Upon receiving the captured emperor, Kaykaus I asked for the city's surrender in the emperor's name but received a negative response. According to Selçuk-nâme, 1000 troops led by a commander named Behram cut off the city from the sea, burning ships and killing several Greeks and Western Europeans in the process. Upon this, the city surrendered.

Although the primary sources consistently named the leader of the Trapezuntine forces as Alexios, beginning with Fallmerayer, earlier scholars used to place the death of David Komnenos, Alexios' younger brother and co-founder of the Trapezuntine empire, during the siege of Sinope. For example, Alexander Vasiliev wrote in 1936, "the name of Alexius, the first emperor of Trebizond, was of course more familiar ... than the name of his brother David, the real ruler of Sinope at that time. But since the name of David never occurs in the sources after 1214, we may positively conclude that David was slain at the first Turkish capture of Sinope." Modern research, however, has shown that he died in exile as a monk in Mount Athos in 1212/13.

The Seljuq capture of Sinope had important consequences: apart from a period of Trapezuntine recovery in 1254–1265, the city henceforth remained in Turkish hands, cutting the small Trapezuntine state off from overland contact with the metropolitan Byzantine lands of the Empire of Nicaea in western Asia Minor. At the same time, the capture of its ruler forced the Trapezuntines to accept tributary status to the Seljuqs, which lasted until the failure of a Seljuq assault on Trebizond itself in 1222-23. According to the Byzantinist Warren Treadgold, the loss of Sinope, on the one hand, "shielded Trebizond from further attacks from Nicaea" but also meant that "henceforth Alexios' claim to be Byzantine emperor rang hollow, and the Empire of Trebizond ceased to be of more than local importance."

The Russian Byzantinist Rustam Shukurov argues that the consequences were even more severe for the Byzantine successor states. The loss of that part of northwestern Anatolia, writes Shukurov, "meant in fact that the Byzantine Greeks lost forever the possibility of a strategic initiative in the northern part of the Byzantine front." The sphere of Byzantine control was split into two enclaves, each blockaded by the ujs: a western Anatolian enclave that was destroyed and almost entirely assimilated by the 14th century, and an eastern enclave consolidated by the Empire of Trebizond that survived much longer, into the 15th century. Further, the capture of Sinope provided the Seljuks access to new strategic routes of conquest, one aimed at Constantinople and the other at Crimea and the south Russian steppes.

== Sources ==
- Savvides, Alexios G. K. (2009). Ιστορία της Αυτοκρατορίας των Μεγάλων Κομνηνών της Τραπεζούντας (1204–1461). 2η Έκδοση με προσθήκες [History of the Empire of the Grand Komnenoi of Trebizond (1204–1461). 2nd Edition with additions] (in Greek). Thessaloniki: Kyriakidis Brothers S.A. ISBN 978-9604671212.
- Treadgold, Warren (1997). A History of the Byzantine State and Society. Stanford, California: Stanford University Press. ISBN 0-8047-2630-2.
- Turan, Osman (2004). Selçuklular Zamanında Türkiye [Turkey at the Time of the Seljuqs] (in Turkish). Istanbul: Ötüken Neşriyat. ISBN 978-6051552330.
