= Rusudan of Georgia, Empress of Trebizond =

Rusudan of Georgia, Empress of Trebizond (Georgian: რუსუდანი) was a consort of Manuel I of Trebizond, and the mother of Empress Theodora. Very little is known for certain about her.

== Family ==
Rusudan is commonly considered a member of the Bagrationi dynasty. Szabolcs de Vajay has argued that Rusudan was probably an illegitimate daughter of Giorgi IV Lasha. However, Michel Kuršanskis argues that Rusudan could have been no more than a commoner and mistress of Emperor Manuel. First, Kuršanskis notes that it was not Georgian custom to name their children after their parents. "That alone should be enough to indicate that Rusudan couldn't be a daughter of the homonymous Queen," he writes. He points out that in the chronicle of Michael Panaretos she is the only one of the three women who gave him children who is not referred to as kyra, or "lady". Lastly, Rusudan is described simply as "from Iberia" and nothing is said about her ancestry.

== Empress ==
Rusudan is mentioned briefly in the chronicle of Michael Panaretos. "Lady Theodora Komnene, the first daughter of lord Manuel the Grand Komnenos by Russadan from Iberia." Drawing on Georgian sources, Kuršanskis suggests that Rusudan died in 1247.

Manuel had at least two daughters whose mother is not mentioned, and they could be children by Rusudan. One of the daughters, married Demetre II of Georgia, the other married one of his Didebul. Though mentioned in modern genealogies as a name, "Didebul" was actually a title. According to "The Bagrationi (Bagration) Dynasty" by Christopher Buyers, the Didebul were "non-hereditary noblemen of high rank, senior to aznaur, usually enjoyed by one in state service".

Royal titles
Preceded by Anna Xylaloe	Empress consort of Trebizond c. 1240s – 1250s	Succeeded by Irene Syrikaina
