= Aspron =

Byzantine name

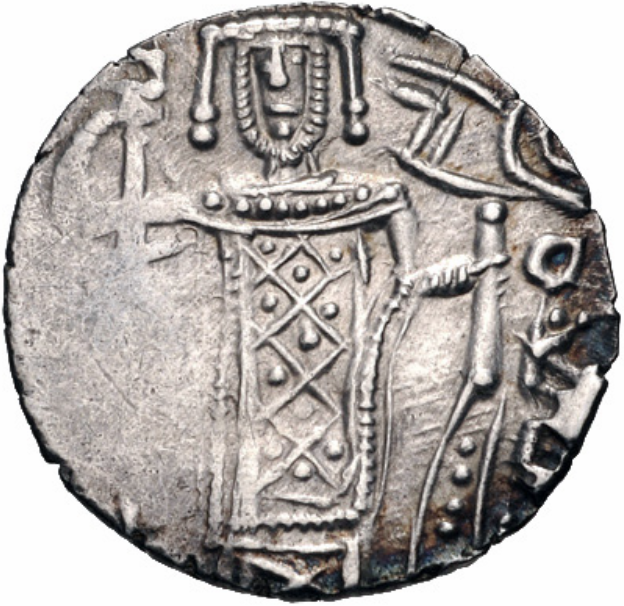
Aspron minted by Manuel I of Trebizond

The aspron (Greek: ἄσπρον), from Latin asper, was a late Byzantine name for silver or silver-alloy coins.

The Latin word asper originally meant "rough", but had gradually acquired the connotation of "fresh" or "freshly minted", i.e. not worn smooth by use, and, especially when referring to silver, "white", by the imperial period. It acquired a technical meaning in the 12th century, when the Byzantines began to refer to the billon trachy coin, which was issued in a blanched state, as an aspron. The same name was also sometimes applied to the contemporary electrum trachy as well.

The name re-appears in the 14th–15th centuries as a generic name for silver coinage, such as the Byzantine doukatopoulon or the Turkish akçe. The 15th century account books of the Venetian merchant-banker Giacomo Badoer lists several cities and governments that coined aspers, which included Trebizond, Caffa, Simisso (or Samsun), Tana, and Rhodes.

== Sources ==
- Grierson, Philip (1991). "Asper". In Kazhdan, Alexander (ed.). The Oxford Dictionary of Byzantium. Oxford and New York: Oxford University Press. p. 211. ISBN 978-0-19-504652-6.
