= Komnenos =

Byzantine Greek noble family

Komnenos Κομνηνός Komnenian dynasty
- Country: Byzantine Empire; Cyprus; Empire of Trebizond
- Founded: 10th century 1057; 969 years ago (as imperial family)
- Founder: Manuel Erotikos Komnenos (first known; possibly founder); Isaac I Komnenos (first emperor)
- Final ruler: Andronikos I Komnenos (Byzantine Empire); Isaac III Komnenos (Cyprus); David Megas Komnenos (Empire of Trebizond)
- Final head: John Komnenos Molyvdos
- Titles: Emperor and Autocrat of the Romans; Emperor of Trebizond; Emperor of Cyprus; Queen of Jerusalem^{a}; Princess of Antioch^{a}; Duchess of Athens^{a}
- Dissolution: 1719; 307 years ago
- Deposition: 1185; 841 years ago (Byzantine Empire); 1461; 565 years ago (Empire of Trebizond)
- Cadet branches: Angelos, Komnenodoukai, Laskaris, Kantakouzenos, Palaiologos, Strategopoulos, Andronikashvili

The House of Komnenos (pl. Komnenoi; Greek: Κομνηνός, pl. Κομνηνοί, pronounced [komniˈni]), Latinized as Comnenus (pl. Comneni), was a Byzantine Greek noble family who ruled the Byzantine Empire in the 11th and 12th centuries. The first reigning member, Isaac I Komnenos, ruled from 1057 to 1059. The family returned to power under Alexios I Komnenos in 1081 who established their rule for the following 104 years until it ended with Andronikos I Komnenos in 1185. In the 13th century, they founded the Empire of Trebizond, a Byzantine rump state which they ruled from 1204 to 1461. At that time, they were commonly referred to as Grand Komnenoi (Μεγαλοκομνηνοί, Megalokomnenoi), a style that was officially adopted and used by George Komnenos and his successors. Through intermarriages with other noble families, notably the Doukas, Angelos, and Palaiologos, the Komnenos name appears among most of the major noble houses of the late Byzantine world.

== Origins ==
The 11th-century Byzantine historian Michael Psellos reported that the Komnenos family originated from the village of Komne, in southern Thrace—usually identified with the "Fields of Komnene" (Κομνηνῆς λειμῶνας) near Adrianople mentioned in the 14th century by John Kantakouzenos, or further south at Komniana (Κομνιανά) according to Varzos—a view commonly accepted by modern scholarship. The first known member of the family, Manuel Erotikos Komnenos, acquired extensive estates at Kastamon in Paphlagonia, which became the stronghold of the family in the 11th century. The family thereby quickly became associated with the powerful and prestigious military aristocracy (dynatoi) of Asia Minor, so that despite coming from Thrace it came to be considered "eastern". Aside from deriving legitimacy as rulers from familial links to the prominent Doukai (emperors Constantine X and Michael VII in particular), they also had a tradition linking them to Claudius Gothicus, the supposed grandfather of Constantine the Great. Many classical monuments dedicated to Claudius stood in the vicinity of Kastra Komnenon, which according to historian Maximilian C. G. Lau may have increased his appeal in the eyes of the Komnenoi.

The 17th-century French scholar du Cange suggested that the family descended from a Roman noble family that followed Constantine the Great to Constantinople, from whose cousin but although such mythical genealogies were common—and are attested for the closely related Doukas clan as well—the complete absence of any such assertion in the Byzantine sources argues against Du Cange's view. The Romanian historian George Murnu suggested in 1924 that the Komnenoi were of Aromanian descent, but this view too is now rejected. Modern scholars consider the family to have been entirely of Greek origin.

Manuel Erotikos Komnenos was the father of Isaac I Komnenos (r. 1057–1059), and grandfather, through Isaac's younger brother John Komnenos, of Alexios I Komnenos (r. 1081–1118).

== Founding the dynasty ==
Isaac I Komnenos, a stratopedarch of the East under Michael VI, founded the Komnenos dynasty of Byzantine emperors. In 1057 Isaac led a coup against Michael and was proclaimed emperor. Although his reign lasted only until 1059, when his courtiers pressured him to abdicate and become a monk, Isaac initiated many useful reforms. The dynasty returned to the throne with the accession of Alexios I Komnenos, Isaac I's nephew, in 1081. By this time, descendants of all the previous dynasties of Byzantium seem to have disappeared from the realm, such as the important Scleros and Argyros families. Descendants of those emperors lived abroad, having married into the royal families of Georgia, Russia, France, Persia, Italy, Germany, Poland, Bulgaria, Hungary and Serbia; this made it easier for the Komnenos family to ascend to the throne.

Upon their rise to the throne, the Komnenoi became intermarried with the previous Doukas dynasty: Alexios I married Irene Doukaina, the grandniece of Constantine X Doukas, who had succeeded Isaac I in 1059. Thereafter the combined clan was often referred to as Komnenodoukai (Κομνηνοδούκαι) and several individuals used both surnames together. Several families descended from this wider clan, such as Palaiologos, Angelos, Vatatzes and Laskaris. Alexios and Irene's youngest daughter Theodora ensured the future success of the Angelos family by marrying into it: Theodora's grandsons became the emperors Isaac II Angelos (reigned 1185–1195 and 1203–1204) and Alexios III Angelos (reigned 1195–1203).

== Komnenoi as emperors ==
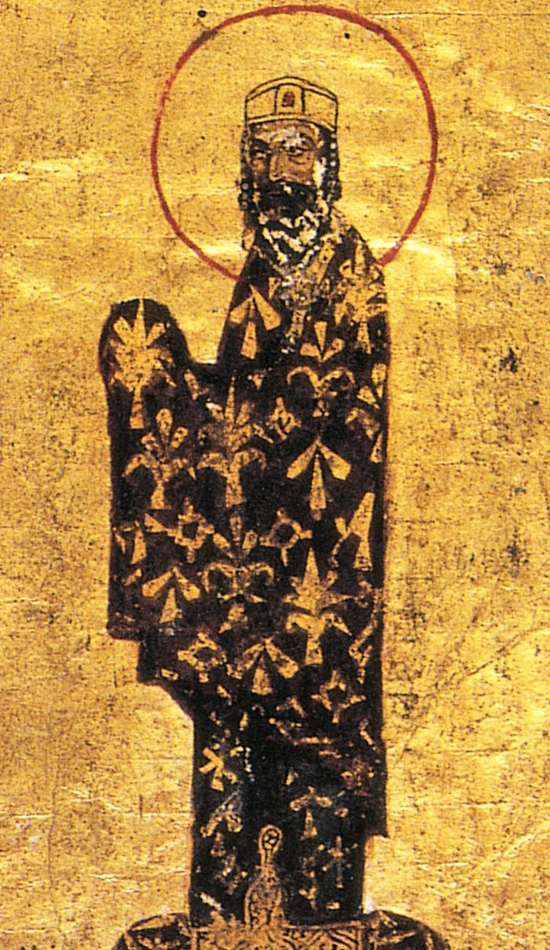
Alexios I Komnenos

Under Alexios I and his successors the Empire was fairly prosperous and stable. Alexios moved the imperial palace to the Blachernae section of Constantinople. Much of Anatolia was recovered from the Seljuk Turks, who had captured it just prior to Alexios' reign. Alexios also saw the First Crusade pass through Byzantine territory, leading to the establishment of the Crusader states in the east. The Komnenos dynasty was very much involved in crusader affairs, and also intermarried with the reigning families of the Principality of Antioch and the Kingdom of Jerusalem; Theodora Komnene, niece of Manuel I Komnenos, married Baldwin III of Jerusalem, and Maria, grandniece of Manuel, married Amalric I of Jerusalem.

Remarkably, Alexios ruled for 37 years, and his son John II ruled for 25, after uncovering a conspiracy against him by his sister, the chronicler Anna Komnene. John's son Manuel ruled for another 37 years.

The Komnenos dynasty produced a number of branches. As imperial succession was not in a determined order but rather depended on personal power and the wishes of one's predecessor, within a few generations several relatives were able to present themselves as claimants. After Manuel I's reign the Komnenos dynasty fell into conspiracies and plots like many of its predecessors (and the various contenders within the family sought power and often succeeded in overthrowing the preceding kinsman); Alexios II, the first Komnenos to ascend as a minor, ruled for three years and his conqueror and successor Andronikos I ruled for two, overthrown by the Angelos family under Isaac II who was dethroned and blinded by his own brother Alexios III. The Angeloi were overthrown during the Fourth Crusade in 1204, by Alexios V Doukas, a relative from the Doukas family.

== Later family ==
The widespread branches of the Komnenoi were severely culled in the turmoils of the late 12th century: first Andronikos I executed many of his own relatives because they opposed his own policies, while the opposition by the Komnenian-led aristocracy to Isaac II Angelos also resulted in the death of many family members. Coupled with the chaos after the Sack of Constantinople and the destruction of the Byzantine Empire by the Fourth Crusade, the exact genealogical connections of the various Komnenoi mentioned in later sources are difficult to determine.

Several weeks before the occupation of Constantinople by crusaders in 1204, one branch of the Komnenoi fled back to their homelands in Paphlagonia, along the eastern Black Sea and its hinterland in the Pontic Alps, where they established the Empire of Trebizond. Their first 'emperor', named Alexios I, was the grandson of Emperor Andronikos I. These emperors—the Grand Komnenoi (Megaloi Komnenoi or Megalokomnenoi in Greek) as they were known (Note: On the various theories on the origin and significance of the name, cf. indicatively Lampsidis 1967, Hemmerdinger 1970, Schreiner 1971, Macrides 1979)—ruled in Trebizond until 1461, when the empire fell to the Ottomans. The last emperor, David Komnenos was, and his family were executed two years later by the Ottoman sultan Mehmed II. Mehmed himself claimed descent from the Komnenos family via John Tzelepes Komnenos, and this was a story that despite being questioned as false by Spanoudes became widely disseminated.

The Trapezutine branch of the Komnenos dynasty also held the name of Axouchos as descendants of John Axouch, a Byzantine nobleman and minister to the Byzantine Komnenian Dynasty. A princess of the Trebizond branch is said to have been the mother of prince Yahya (born 1585), who reportedly became a Christian yet spent much of his life attempting to gain the Ottoman throne.

Another branch of the family, descendants of Constantine Angelos, founded the Despotate of Epirus in 1204, under Michael I Komnenos Doukas, great-grandson of Emperor Alexios I. This branch adopted the surnames Komnenos Doukas and are known as such in modern scholarship. Helena Doukaina Komnene, a child of that branch of the family, married Guy I de la Roche thereby uniting the Komnenos and the de la Roche houses, with Komnenos family members eventually becoming Dukes of Athens.

One renegade member of the family, also named Isaac Komnenos, established a separate "empire" on Cyprus in 1184, which lasted until 1191, when the island was taken from him by Richard I of England during the Third Crusade. His daughter, called the Damsel of Cyprus, married Thierry of Flanders during the Fourth Crusade and tried to claim the island.

When the Byzantine Empire was restored in 1261 at Constantinople, it was ruled by a family closely related to the Komnenoi, the Palaiologoi. The Palaiologoi ruled until the fall of Constantinople to the Ottoman Turks in 1453.

The last descendant of the dynasty is often considered to have been John Komnenos Molyvdos, a distinguished Ottoman Greek scholar and physician, who became metropolitan bishop of Side and Dristra, and died in 1719. During the Ottoman period, the name "Komnenos", like that of the Byzantine imperial dynasties of Laskaris and Palaiologos, began to be given as a first name. These names often were turned into surnames, whence many modern-day bearers of the name.

Many later Greeks claimed Komnenian descent, but this is almost certainly fiction. This is the case for Patriarch Dionysios IV of Constantinople and the scholar Niccolò Comneno Papadopoli in the 17th century. Likewise, in 1782, the Corsican Greek notable Demetrio Stefanopoli obtained letters patent from Louis XVI of France recognizing him as the descendant and heir of the Emperors of Trebizond, but such a descent is a later invention.

== Family tree ==
Genealogy of the Komnenos dynasty:

Family of Komnenos

Manuel Erotikos Komnenos; 955/960–1020
Isaac I c. 1007–1060	John Komnenos; Kouropalates c. 1015–1067 ∞ Anna Dalassene
Manuel Komnenos; Kouropalates c. 1045–1071	Isaac Komnenos; Sebastokrator c. 1050–1102/4	Alexios I Komnenos c. 1057–1118 ∞ Irene Doukaina	Adrianos Komnenos; Protosebastos c. 1060–1105	Nikephoros Komnenos; Sebastos c. 1065–a. 1136
Anna Komnene; Kaisarissa; 1083–1153 ∞ Nikephoros Bryennios	John II Komnenos; 1118–1143 ∞Irene of Hungary	Andronikos Komnenos; Sebastokrator; 1091–1131	Isaac Komnenos; Sebastokrator; 1093–a. 1152	Theodora Komnene; Sebastohypertate; 1096–a. 1136 ∞ Constantine Angelos
Alexios (II) the Younger; 1106–1142	Isaac Komnenos; Sebastokrator c.1113–a.1146	Manuel I Komnenos; 1118–1180 ∞ Maria of Antioch	Andronikos I Komnenos c.1119–1185	ANGELOS DYNASTY
Eirene Komnene c.1133–a. 1155	Alexios II; 1169–1183	Manuel Komnenos; Sebastokrator; 1145–a.1185	John Komnenos; 1159–1185
Isaac Komnenos; Emperor of Cyprus; 1155–1196	Alexios I Megas Komnenos; Emperor of Trebizond c.1182–1222	David Megas Komnenos (Note: The first to use the name Megas Komnenos.); Ruler of Paphlagonia; 1184–1212
MEGAS KOMNENOS DYNASTY

== See also ==
- History of the Byzantine Empire
- Family tree of Byzantine emperors
- List of members of the Komnenos Family

== General references ==
- Cameron, Averil (Ed.) (2003) Fifty Years of Prosopography: The Later Roman Empire, Byzantium and Beyond, Oxford University Press.
- Hemmerdinger, Bertrand (1970). "Μέγας Κομνηνός. Calque de Hohenstaufen". Byzantion (in French). 40: 33–35.
- Kazhdan, Alexander, ed. (1991). The Oxford Dictionary of Byzantium. Oxford and New York: Oxford University Press. ISBN 0-19-504652-8.
- Koytcheva, Elena (2007). "The Komnenoi "Familia et Domus"". Études balkaniques (4): 115–122. ISSN 0324-1645.
- Lampsidis, Odysseas (1967). "Le titre Μέγας Κομνηνός (Grand Comnène)". Byzantion (in French). 37: 114–125.
- Macrides, Ruth (1979). "What's in the name 'Megas Komnenos'?". Αρχείον Πόντου. 35: 236–245.
- Schreiner, Peter (1971). "Zur Bezeichnung "Megas" und "Megas Basileus" in der byzantinischen Kaisertitulatur". Βυζαντινά (in German). 3: 173–192.
- Varzos, Konstantinos (1984). Η Γενεαλογία των Κομνηνών [The Genealogy of the Komnenoi] (PDF) (in Greek). Vol. A1. Thessaloniki: Centre for Byzantine Studies, University of Thessaloniki.
- Varzos, Konstantinos (1984). Η Γενεαλογία των Κομνηνών [The Genealogy of the Komnenoi] (PDF) (in Greek). Vol. B. Thessaloniki: Centre for Byzantine Studies, University of Thessaloniki.
