= List of Byzantine families =

This is a list of Byzantine families, including the aristocracy of the Byzantine Empire from the 6th- to 15th century.

With the rapid expansion of Byzantine economy from 950 to 1200, a self-aware aristocracy emerged; by 1200, some 80% of Byzantine officials bore a second name, as opposed to only 20% in 800. Personal seals were an exhibit of social status and power. Prior to 900, no seal with a second name has been attested.

== Dynasties ==
- Leonid dynasty
- Justinian dynasty
- Heraclian dynasty
- Isaurian dynasty
- Nikephorian dynasty
- Amorian dynasty
- Macedonian dynasty
- Komnenos (Komnenid)
- Doukas (Doukid)
- Angelid dynasty
- Laskarid dynasty
- Palaiologan dynasty

== Noble families ==
- Aaronios, active in the 11th c.
- Amytzantarioi, active in the Empire of Trebizond in mid-14th c.
- Anemas, most active in 12th c., notably participated in 1105 conspiracy.
- Angelos, most active in 12th–14th c., rose quickly through Constantine Angelos (1093–1166), produced three emperors
- Apion, active in Egypt in 5th–7th c.
- Apokaukos, most active in the 13th c.
- Argyros, most active in Anatolia in the 11th c.
- Arianites, active in the 11th c.
- Aspietes, most active in the 12th c.
- Axouch, active in the 12th c.
- Botaneiates, most active in 11th–12th c., produced several generals.
- Basilakes, most active in the 11th c.
- Branas, active in Adrianople in the 12th–13th c.
- Bryennios, most active in the 11th–12th c., as commanders.
- Bourtzes
- Chalkokondyles, active in Athens in the 15th c.
- Choumnos,
- Dabetenos
- Daimonoioannes, mostly active in Monemvasia
- Dalassenos, most active in the 11th c.
- Dermokaites, most active in 11th–12th c.
- Diogenes, most active in the 11th c.
- Doukas, most active in the 10th–11th c.
- Doxapatres, active in 11th–12th c., produced writers
- Euphorbenos
- Gabalas, active in 13th c.
- Gabras, active in Chaldia in the 11th–12th c.
- Glabas
- Hagiotheodorites, most active in the 12th c.
- Kaballarios
- Kabasilas, active in 11th–13th c.
- Kalothetos, active in the 13th–14th c.
- Kamateros, most active in the 10th–12th c.
- Kamytzes, active in the 12th–13th c.
- Kastamonites
- Katakalon, active in the 10th–12th c.
- Kekaumenos, active in the 11th c.
- Keroularios, most active in the 11th c.
- Kontomytes
- Kontostephanos, most active in the 12th c.
- Kourkouas, most active in the 10th c.
- Kourtikios, active in the 10th–11th c.
- Laskaris, active in 12th–13th c., founded the Empire of Nicaea.
- Lekapenos, most active in the 10th c.
- Libadarios, active in the 13th c.
- Makrembolites, active in the 11th–13th c.
- Maleinos, most active in the 10th c.
- Maliasenos
- Mangaphas
- Maurokatakalon, cadet branch of Katakalon
- Mavrogenis
- Melissenos, most active in Anatolia in the 9th–11th c.
- Metochites
- Monomachos, most active in the 10th–11th c.
- Mourouzis
- Mouzalon, most active in the 12th–13th c.
- Notaras, most active in the 14th–15th c.
- Pakourianos
- Parsakoutenos
- Pegonites, active in 11th–12th c.
- Petraliphas, active in the 12th–13th c.
- Philanthropenos, active in the 13th–14th c.
- Philes
- Phokas, most active in 9th–11th c.
- Provatas, active in 11th–12th c.
- Rangabe
- Raoul, most active in 13th c.
- Rendakis, most active in 8th–10th c.
- Rogerios
- Sarantapechos, active in 8th c.
- Serblias, active in 11th–12th c.
- Sgouros, active in 11th–15th c.
- Skleros, most active in 10th–11th c.
- Sphrantzes
- Stypeiotes
- Synadenos, active in 11th–12th c.
- Tagaris, active in 14th c.
- Tarchaneiotes, most active in 11th–13th c.
- Taronites
- Tornikios
- Tzamplakon, active in the 14th c.
- Tzanichites, active in the Empire of Trebizond in the 14th c.
- Vatatzes, active in 12th–14th c., John III ruled empire of Nicaea (r. 1222–1254).
- Xeros

== See also ==
- Byzantine bureaucracy and aristocracy

== Sources ==
- Kazhdan, Alexander, ed. (1991). The Oxford Dictionary of Byzantium. Oxford and New York: Oxford University Press. ISBN 0-19-504652-8.
- Trapp, Erich; Beyer, Hans-Veit; Walther, Rainer; Sturm-Schnabl, Katja; Kislinger, Ewald; Leontiadis, Ioannis; Kaplaneres, Sokrates (1976–1996). Prosopographisches Lexikon der Palaiologenzeit (in German). Vienna: Verlag der Österreichischen Akademie der Wissenschaften. ISBN 3-7001-3003-1.
