= Zealots of Thessalonica =

Social movement in the Byzantine Empire (1342–1350)

The Zealots (Greek: Ζηλωταί) were a political group that dominated political developments in Thessalonica from 1342 until 1350. The contemporary sources, notably anti-Zealot in sympathies, provide little information on the Zealots' government of Thessalonica. The Zealots managed to establish effective civic self-government for eight years. They confiscated the property of the aristocracy, and redistributed their wealth. In the past it had been claimed that the Zealots had a kind of social reform program, but sources are scant. Many of these claims were built upon a discourse of the scholar Nikolaos Kabasilas, but eventually it seems that it had no connection to the Zealot revolt but was composed many decades later.

== Background ==
At the beginning of the fourteenth century, the Byzantine Empire went into dramatic decline. There was a major civil war in the 1320s, accompanied with invasions from almost all sides. As the Empire became weaker and more impoverished, the misery of the great masses in the countryside and in the cities became almost unbearable. Both in the country and in the towns all wealth was concentrated in the hands of a small aristocratic class, and against them was directed the bitterness of the destitute masses.

John Kantakouzenos, after the death of Emperor Andronikos III Palaiologos was the effective regent for the latter's infant son, John V. A faction in Constantinople, formed around the powerful megas doux Alexios Apokaukos, plotted against him, and managed to enlist the support of dowager empress Anna of Savoy and the Patriarch John Kalekas. The conflict between the new regency and Kantakouzenos broke out openly in October 1341.

The literary sources, all in favor of Kantakouzenos, presented the conflict as a struggle between the "aristoi" (i.e. the best) and the poor. In fact, the aristocracy was divided equally between the two factions, while most aristocratic supporters of Kantakouzenos soon abandoned him in 1342-1343 after his first major defeats. Against Kantakouzenos also militated the common people of the cities, often after encouragement of the authorities. In many cities of Thrace, which had joined Kantakouzenos in the early stages of the civil war, there were riots in favor of the rightful minor John V. In addition, contemporary Byzantine society was also divided on religious issues, between the mysticist Hesychasts or Palamites and the intellectuals or Barlaamites, who preferred to pursue the study of philosophy and cherished the inheritance of Ancient Greece. During the second civil war Thessalonica was administered by anti-Hesychast metropolitans. We know little about the attitudes of the Zealots to this controversy, but it is a fact that one of their leaders, Andreas Palaiologos, sought spiritual guidance to St. Savvas, one of the leading Hesychasts.

The movement was probably also influenced by the Bogomilism, a Christian heresy, which was present in the region since the 9th century.

== Rise and establishment of the Zealots regime ==
"... They roused up the people against the aristocracy, and for two or three days, Thessalonica was like a city under enemy occupation and suffered all the corresponding disasters. The victors went shouting and looting through the streets by day and by night, while the vanquished hid in churches and counted themselves lucky to be still alive. When order returned, the Zealots, suddenly raised from penury and dishonour to wealth and influence, took control of everything and won over the moderate citizens, forcing them to acquiesce and characterizing every form of moderation and prudence as "Kantakouzenism"."
John Kantakouzenos, History

Thessalonica at the time was the second most important city of the Empire after Constantinople. Wealthy and almost as populous as the capital, its people had already resented control from the far-off capital, and had already once rebelled against the Constantinople-appointed governor: in the first Palaiologan civil war, in 1322, they had ousted the despotēs Constantine Palaiologos in favour of Andronikos III and his lieutenant, John Kantakouzenos. When the second civil war broke out, control of the city was of great importance to both camps, and Kantakouzenos' supporters, led by its governor Theodore Synadenos, tried to deliver it to him. The people of the city however reacted, ousted them and took control of the city. Apokaukos himself arrived shortly after at the head of a fleet, and installed Michael Monomachos as its governor, who was succeeded in 1343 by Ioannes Batatzes and in 1344 by Apokaukos' son, the megas primikērios John Apokaukos. Real power in the city however rested with the Zealots' leader, a Michael Palaiologos, who jointly with the governors held the title of archōn. As in every city of the empire, a city council, made up of the local aristocracy and other influential citizens, participated in local affairs.

Michael and Andreas Palaiologos were the leaders of the revolt. Despite efforts to identify them however, they do not fit in any way into the known Palaiologan family tree, and we do not even know their relationship to each other: they may, indeed, simply have come from some sort of client family or families who took the dynastic name by extension. But one point does remain unavoidable: the so-called “revolutionaries” did consistently identify themselves with Palaiologan legitimacy. Although the Zealots, throughout their existence, continued to recognize the legitimate Emperor John V Palaiologos, it is possible that they tried to achieve a semi-autonomous status for the city of Thessalonica.

Although it has been claimed that they had a political program supporting the lower classes, as they were based mainly to the workers of the port, they themselves belonged to the aristocracy, while the confiscated properties of the supporters of Kantakouzenos were directed to the supporters of the regency. The people may indeed have anti-aristocratic motives, but this did not represent the purposes of the Zealots.

== Apokaukos' coup, reaction and terror ==
"...one after another the prisoners were hurled from the walls of the citadel and hacked to pieces by the mob of the Zealots assembled below. Then followed a hunt for all the members of the upper classes: they were driven through the streets like slaves, with ropes round their necks-here a servant dragged his master, there a slave his purchaser, while the peasant struck the strategos and the labourer beat the soldier [the land-holding pronoiars]."
Demetrius Cydones describing the anti-aristocratic killings of 1345

During the next years, the city successfully resisted attempts of Kantakouzenos to capture the city with the aid of his allies, the Seljuk Emir Umur and Stefan Dusan of Serbia. As the tide of the civil war gradually turned toward Kantakouzenos however, John Apokaukos began plotting against the Zealots. He contacted the remnants of the pro-Kantakouzenian aristocracy, and after having Michael Palaiologos killed, assumed power himself and arrested most prominent Zealots without any popular reaction. After learning of his father's murder in Constantinople in June 1345, Apokaukos decided to hand the city over to Kantakouzenos, but the city mob, led by Andreas Palaiologos, another leader of the Longshoremen (parathalassioi), rose up against him. Apokaukos and about a hundred of the leading aristocrats were lynched, and everyone even suspected of "Kantakouzenism" was liable to be killed and his house and property plundered.

== End ==
In 1347 Kantakouzenos and the Emperor John V reconciled, but the Zealots ignored the orders from Constantinople, such as the appointment of Gregory Palamas as its archbishop, as the majority of them were anti-Hesychasts. The city remained isolated from the outside world, suffered from the Black Death, and was further subject to the continued threat of Stefan Dushan. The situation became increasingly desperate, and there was even talk of surrendering the city to the protection of foreign, namely Serbian, rule. This however was unacceptable to many Thessalonians, including the other archon, Alexios Laskaris Metochites.

At the end of 1349, the people of the city finally rose in revolt against the Zealots, who were defeated, and plundered their properties. Andreas Palaiologos fled to Mount Athos and became a monk in the monastery of Great Lavra. Negotiations followed, and in 1350, Kantakouzenos, accompanied by Emperor John Palaiologos and Palamas, made a triumphal entry into the city.

== Sources ==
- Barker, John W. (2002). "Late Byzantine Thessalonike: A Second City's Challenges and Responses" (PDF). Dumbarton Oaks Papers (57). Archived from the original (PDF) on 2009-03-05.
- Bartusis, Mark C. (1997). The Late Byzantine Army: Arms and Society 1204–1453. University of Pennsylvania Press. ISBN 0-8122-1620-2.
- Lowry, S. Todd; Gordon, Barry L.J. (1998). Ancient and Medieval Economic Ideas and Concepts of Social Justice. Brill. ISBN 978-90-04-09964-7.
- Malatras, Christos (2012–2013). "The myth of the Zealots" (PDF). Byzantiaka (30).
- Matschke, Klaus-Peter (1994). "Thessalonike und die Zeloten. Bemerkungen zu einem Schlusselereignis der spatbyzantinischen Stadt- und Reichsgeschichte". Byzantinoslavica (55).
- Nicol, Donald MacGillivray (1993). The Last Centuries of Byzantium, 1261–1453. Cambridge University Press. ISBN 978-0-521-43991-6.
- Nicol, Donald MacGillivray (1996). The Reluctant Emperor: A Biography of John Cantacuzene, Byzantine Emperor and Monk, C. 1295–1383. Cambridge University Press. ISBN 978-0-521-52201-4.
- Runciman, Steven (1970). The Last Byzantine Renaissance. Cambridge University Press. ISBN 0-521-07787-7.
- Shevchenko, Ihor (1957). "Nicolas Cabasilas' "Anti-Zealot" Discourse". Dumbarton Oaks Papers. 11 (11). doi:10.2307/1291106. JSTOR 1291106.
