= Tzamplakon =

Tzamplakon is a surname. Notable people with the surname include:

- Alexios Tzamplakon (fl. 1317–1332), Byzantine aristocrat
- Asomatianos Tzamplakon (fl. 1348–1349), Byzantine aristocrat
- Demetrios Tzamplakon (fl. 1345–1366/67), Byzantine aristocrat
