= Maria-Irene Palaiologina =

Byzantine princess and Bulgarian empress consort

Irene Εἰρήνη Παλαιολογίνα

Empress consort of Bulgaria
- Born: 1327; Byzantine Empire
- Died: c. 1376/77
- Burial: Mesembria
- Spouse: Michael Asen IV of Bulgaria
- Father: Andronikos III Palaiologos
- Mother: Anna of Savoy

Irene Palaiologina (Greek: Εἰρήνη Παλαιολογίνα; 1327 – 1376/77) was a Byzantine princess and Bulgarian empress consort. She was also known as Maria Palaiologina (Μαρία Παλαιολογίνα).

Maria-Irene Palaiologina's parents were Andronikos III Palaiologos and Anna of Savoy, whilst her siblings were John V Palaiologos and Michael Palaiologos.

She married in 1336 Tsar Michael Asen IV of Bulgaria. They had been bethrothed since she was aged 5. In 1355, her husband was killed in battle with the Ottoman Turks near Sofia. By 1356 she was married to Francesco I Gattilusio. They had:

- Andronico Gattilusio (c. 1356 – 6 August 1384).
- Domenico Gattilusio (c. 1358 – 6 August 1384).
- Francesco II Gattilusio (c. 1365 – 26 October 1404)

She died around 1376/77, and was buried in Mesembria.

Nothing else is known about her, except that she was an Orthodox Christian.

== Sources ==
- Guilland, Rodolphe (1959). "Recherches sur l'histoire administrative de l'Empire byzantin: Le despote, δεσπότης". Revue des études byzantines (in French). 17: 52–89. doi:10.3406/rebyz.1959.1199.
- Miller, William (1921). Essays on the Latin Orient. Cambridge at the University Press.
- Wright, Christopher (2014). The Gattilusio Lordships and the Aegean World 1355-1462. Brill.
