= Andronikos Doukas Angelos Komnenos Palaiologos =

Andronikos Doukas Angelos Komnenos Palaiologos can refer to:

- Andronikos II Palaiologos
- Andronikos III Palaiologos
