= Alexios Apokaukos =

Byzantine politician and military leader (died 1345)

Ἀλέξιος Ἀπόκαυκος Alexios Apokaukos
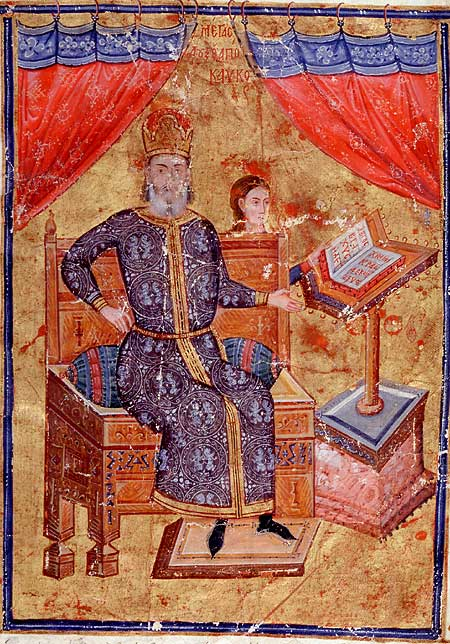
- Donor portrait of the megas doux Alexios Apokaukos, from a collection of the "Works of Hippocrates" commissioned by him in the early 1340s. Alexios is depicted in the garb of his office, wearing a richly decorated kabbadion and the skaranikon, a ceremonial headdress depicting the reigning emperor.
- Born: Bithynia
- Died: 11 June 1345
- Occupations: Statesman and military officer

Alexios Apokaukos (Greek: Ἀλέξιος Ἀπόκαυκος; died 11 June 1345), also Latinized as Alexius Apocaucus, was a chief minister and head of the navy in the Byzantine Empire, during the reigns of emperors Andronikos III Palaiologos (r. 1328–1341) and John V Palaiologos (r. 1341–1357). Although he owed his rise to high state offices to the patronage of John VI Kantakouzenos (r. 1347–1354), he became, together with Patriarch John XIV Kalekas, one of the leaders of the faction supporting Emperor John V in the civil war of 1341–1347 against his one-time benefactor. Apokaukos died when he was lynched by political prisoners during an inspection of a new prison.

== Biography ==
=== Early life ===
Alexios was of humble origin, and was born in the late 13th century somewhere in Bithynia. He nevertheless studied under the scholar Theodore Hyrtakenos, and became a tax official. By 1320 he was director of the salt pans, from which he later advanced to the position of domestikos of the themes of the West. He rose in the bureaucratic hierarchy until, in 1321, he was appointed the imperial parakoimōmenos (chamberlain). His position made him useful to John Kantakouzenos, who included him in a conspiracy, together with Syrgiannes Palaiologos and the prōtostratōr Theodore Synadenos, which aimed to depose the aging Emperor Andronikos II Palaiologos in favour of his grandson Andronikos III. Under the threat of war, the Emperor surrendered Thrace and some districts in Macedonia to the rule of his grandson. When Andronikos III became sole emperor in 1328, his close friend Kantakouzenos became his chief minister, and Alexios was awarded with the positions that Kantakouzenos himself had formerly held: head of the imperial secretariat (mesazōn) and in charge of the state's finances. These positions allowed him to amass a considerable personal fortune, which he used to construct a personal refuge, a fortified tower-house at the site of Epibatai near Selymbria, at the coast of the Sea of Marmara. In early 1341, shortly before Andronikos's death, he was rewarded with the high office of megas doux, giving him the high command over the Byzantine navy. He re-equipped the fleet, paying from his own pocket 100,000 hyperpyra.

=== Civil war ===
Upon Andronikos's death, two factions emerged at court: the supporters of Kantakouzenos, chiefly provincial magnates from Macedonia and Thrace, and those opposed to him, led mainly by the Patriarch John XIV Kalekas, who obtained the support of Andronikos's widow, Anna of Savoy. Kantakouzenos did not claim the throne for himself, but demanded the regency, based on his close association with the deceased emperor, and with the support of the capital's troops secured it. His position, however, was weakened by the adherence of Apokaukos to the Patriarch's camp; Kantakouzenos, in his own account, relates that Apokaukos had urged him to seize the throne in hopes of his own advancement, and when he refused, the powerful chancellor switched over to his opponents' camp.

As soon as Kantakouzenos left Constantinople in July 1341 to campaign against the Empire's enemies who were assaulting it, Apokaukos made his first moves. Although as commander of the fleet it was his duty to guard the Dardanelles against any attempt by Turks to cross into Europe, he deliberately allowed this to happen in order to cause disruption in Thrace. Apokaukos tried to kidnap the young John V, but failed and was forced to flee to his house at Epibatai. However, when Kantakouzenos returned victorious to the capital, instead of depriving Apokaukos of his offices, and against the counsel of his friends, he pardoned his protégé. Apokaukos put on an exaggerated display of deference to Kantakouzenos, who allowed him to resume his offices and return to Constantinople, while Kantakouzenos left on yet another campaign.

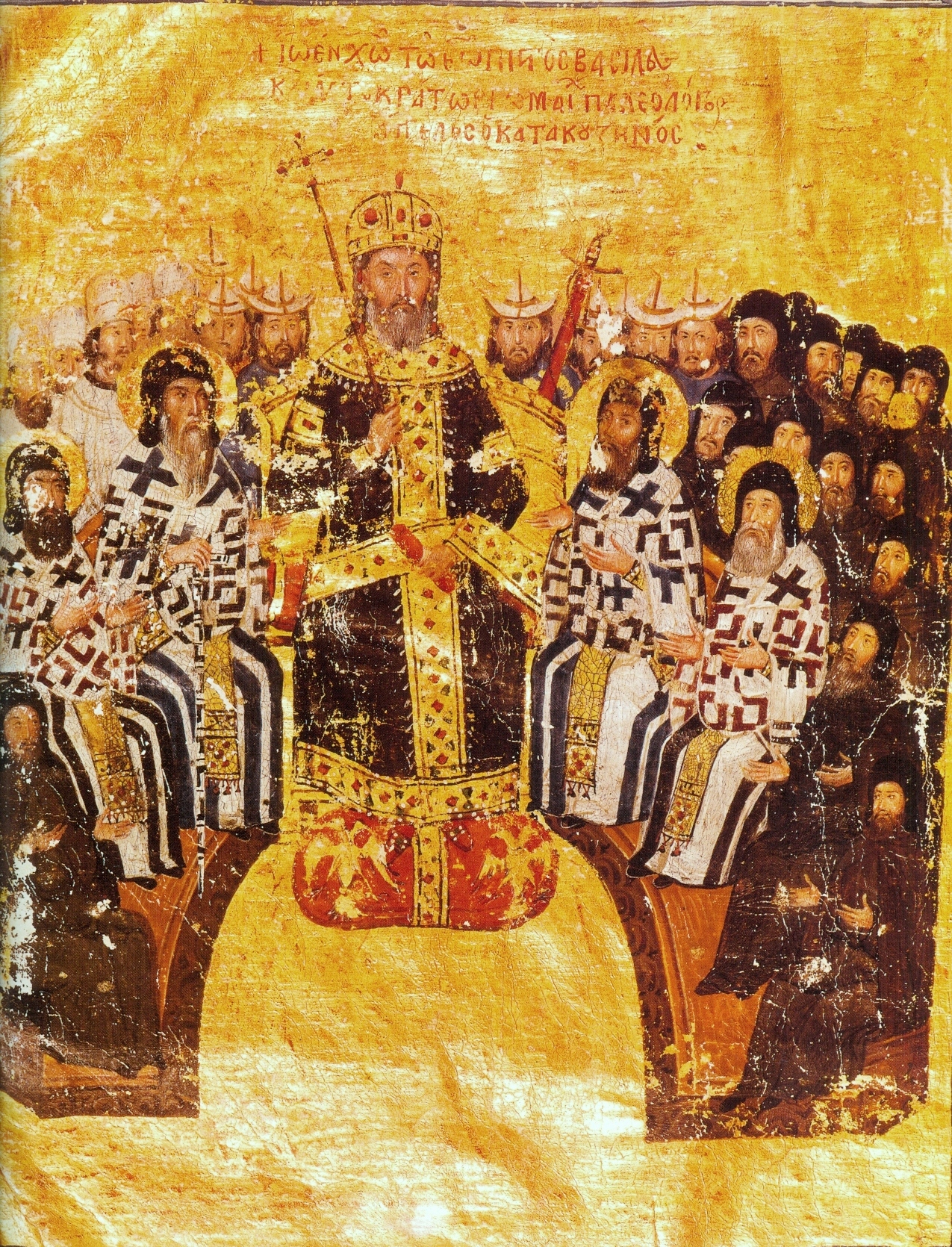
Emperor John VI Kantakouzenos (r. 1347–1354), Apokaukos's patron and victim of his protégé's ambition

Once back in the city, however, the Patriarch and Apokaukos seized power. Kantakouzenos's family and friends were imprisoned (Kantakouzenos's mother Theodora would eventually die in prison) and the Patriarch was declared regent, while Anna named Apokaukos as urban prefect (eparchos) of Constantinople.

Kantakouzenos responded by having himself declared emperor at Didymoteicho in October 1341, while his opponents followed with the coronation of John V in November. The two coronations finalized the split, and ushered in a civil war that would embroil the Byzantine Empire and all of its neighbours until 1347 with Kantakouzenos's victory. In its course, it would devastate the remaining imperial possessions, and create a deep rift in Byzantine society: the aristocracy and the propertied classes generally supported Kantakouzenos, while the lower and middle classes, primarily urban, as well as the merchants and sailors, supported Apokaukos and the regency. This gave the dynastic dispute and civil war strong social overtones: during the war, the excessive wealth and perceived indifference of Kantakouzenos and the aristocracy towards the common people became a standard fixture of Apokaukos's propaganda. In addition, the conflict acquired religious significance as well: the Hesychast controversy divided the pious Byzantines, and, despite some important exceptions, the supporters of Hesychasm also supported Kantakouzenos.

A few days after Kantakouzenos's coronation, the inhabitants of Adrianople rebelled against the aristocracy and declared themselves for the regency, with Apokaukos sending his younger son Manuel to become the city's governor. In a similar development in 1342, Thessalonica, the Empire's second-largest city, was seized by a group known as the "Zealots". Their anti-aristocratic beliefs made them enemies of "Kantakouzenism", and earned them the support of the regency. Apokaukos himself arrived with a fleet of 70 ships to aid them, and appointed his elder son John Apokaukos as the city's governor, although the latter's authority would remain only nominal.

In the first years of the war, the tide was in favour of the regency, until, in the summer of 1342, Kantakouzenos was forced to flee to the court of Stefan Dušan of Serbia. However, from 1343 onwards, with the aid of his friend, Umur Beg of Aydin, Kantakouzenos began to reverse the situation. With the initial support of Stefan Dušan, Kantakouzenos regained much of Macedonia, and despite his failure to take Thessalonica, his Turkish allies enabled him to return to his old stronghold of Didymoteicho in Thrace. Gradually, Apokaukos's supporters abandoned him, including his son Manuel, who deserted his post at Adrianople and went over to the Kantakouzenos camp.

In early 1345, Apokaukos and Kalekas rejected offers of reconciliation conveyed by two Franciscan friars. Trying to bolster his waning power, Apokaukos began a series of proscriptions in the capital, and even ordered a new prison constructed for political prisoners. On 11 June 1345, Apokaukos suddenly decided to inspect the new prison, without being escorted by his bodyguard. The prisoners immediately rose up and lynched him, and his head was severed and stuck on a pole.

The prisoners believed that they would be rewarded by the Empress Anna for getting rid of the hated Apokaukos. She, however, was so shocked and dismayed at the loss of her principal minister, that she gave Apokaukos's supporters, who were joined by the Gasmouloi, the fleet's marines, free rein to avenge their leader's death. As a result, all prisoners, some 200 in total, were massacred, even though some attempted to seek refuge in a nearby monastery.

Although the death of Apokaukos did not bring about the immediate collapse of the regency, it removed the main instigator of the civil war and one of its chief protagonists, and resulted in dissension and defections in the regency's camp. It therefore marked the beginning of the war's end, which would come with Kantakouzenos's entry into Constantinople on 3 February 1347.

However, less than five years later the war would resume, removing Kantakouzenos for good, reinstalling John V Palaiologos and bringing further devastation to the Byzantine Empire.

== Family ==
Alexios Apokaukos had two brothers, John and Nikephoros, of whom very little is known. Alexios himself married twice. His first wife was the daughter of a priest of the Hagia Sophia called Dishypatos, and the second, whom he married sometime around 1341, the cousin of the megas stratopedarchēs Georgios Choumnos. His first marriage produced three children and his second two:

- John Apokaukos, megas primikerios and governor of Thessalonica, killed there in 1345.
- Manuel Apokaukos, governor of Adrianople, defected to Kantakouzenos in 1344.
- Unnamed daughter, who married first the prōtostratōr Andronikos Palaiologos. After he drowned in 1344, she remarried the sebastokratōr John Asan.
- Unnamed daughter, married (in 1341) the son of Patriarch John Kalekas.
- Unnamed daughter, married (in 1341) the son of one of Empress Anna's Latin maids.

One of his sons married a daughter of John Vatatzes.

== Assessment ==
As a self-made "new man", Apokaukos was mistrusted by the scions of the aristocratic families who dominated the imperial government. The only accounts of the period of the civil war, Kantakouzenos's memoirs and the history of Nikephoros Gregoras, with their pro-aristocracy bias, paint a very negative picture of the man, which has been adopted virtually unaltered by most modern historians as well. In a dissenting view, the historian Eva de Vries-Van der Velden believes that the image of Apokaukos as the ungrateful protégé of Kantakouzenos and an inveterate schemer who was responsible for the outbreak of the civil war is inaccurate, and largely the result of distorting propaganda by Kantakouzenos and Gregoras. However, she acknowledges Apokaukos as Kantakouzenos's "most redoubtable adversary" during the war, and the dictatorial nature of his regime after 1343. According to the historian Angeliki Laiou, Apokaukos can also be seen as the exponent of a radical change in the nature and direction of the Byzantine state: in place of the old, agricultural empire, run by a land-based aristocracy, he seems to have favoured a commercial, maritime and likely westward-looking state, in emulation of the Italian maritime republics.

== Sources ==
- Bartusis, Mark C. (1997). The Late Byzantine Army: Arms and Society 1204–1453. Philadelphia, Pennsylvania: University of Pennsylvania Press. ISBN 0-8122-1620-2.
- Cavallo, Guglielmo (1997). The Byzantines. Chicago, Illinois: University of Chicago Press. ISBN 0-226-09792-7.
- de Vries-Van der Velden, Eva (1989). L'Élite Byzantine Devant l'Avance Turque à l'Époque de la Guerre Civile de 1341 à 1354 (in French). Amsterdam, the Netherlands: J.C. Gieben. ISBN 90-5063-026-X.
- Guilland, Rodolphe (1967). Recherches sur les Institutions Byzantines, Tome I (in French). Berlin: Akademie-Verlag.
- Laiou, Angeliki (2008). "Chapter II.3.2D: Political-Historical Survey, 1204–1453". In Jeffreys, Elizabeth; Haldon, John; Cormack, Robin (eds.). The Oxford Handbook of Byzantine Studies. Oxford: Oxford University Press. pp. 281–294. ISBN 978-0-19-925246-6.
- Nicol, Donald M. (1993) [1972]. The Last Centuries of Byzantium, 1261–1453 (Second ed.). Cambridge: Cambridge University Press. ISBN 978-0-521-43991-6.
- Nicol, Donald MacGillivray (1996). The Reluctant Emperor: A Biography of John Cantacuzene, Byzantine Emperor and Monk, c. 1295–1383. Cambridge, United Kingdom: Cambridge University Press. ISBN 978-0-521-52201-4.
- Trapp, Erich; Walther, Rainer; Beyer, Hans-Veit (1976). Prosopographisches Lexikon der Palaiologenzeit (in German). Vol. 1. Vienna: Verlag der Österreichischen Akademie der Wissenschaften. ISBN 3-7001-3003-1.
