= Apokaukos =

Byzantine family

Apokaukos (Greek: Ἀπόκαυκος), feminine form Apokaukissa (Ἀποκαύκισσα) was a Byzantine family attested in the 10th–15th centuries.

The first known member of the family was Basil Apokaukos, strategos of the Peloponnese in c. 990. Other members of the family who held the office of strategos are known from seals. In the late 12th and early 13th centuries, John Apokaukos was Metropolitan of Naupaktos. In 1277, the sebastohypertatos John Apokaukos was a senior official.

The family may have declined though at the end of the 13th century, since Nikephoros Gregoras maintains that the megas doux Alexios Apokaukos, one of the main figures of the Byzantine civil war of 1341–47, came from a humble family. Alexios promoted his relatives to high office: his eldest son John became megas primikerios and governor of Thessalonica, his second son Manuel was governor of Adrianople, and his three daughters received highly-placed husbands. With the end of the civil war in 1345, however, the family declined abruptly in importance.

A George Apokaukos was "archon" at Constantinople in 1403, while at about the same time the painter Alexios Apokaukos, a friend of Joseph Bryennios, settled in Crete. Following the Fall of Constantinople, Demetrios Kyritzes Apokaukos entered the service of the Ottoman Sultan Mehmed II.

== Sources ==
- Kazhdan, Alexander (1991). "Apokaukos". In Kazhdan, Alexander (ed.). The Oxford Dictionary of Byzantium. Oxford and New York: Oxford University Press. p. 134. ISBN 0-19-504652-8.
- Trapp, Erich; Walther, Rainer; Beyer, Hans-Veit (1976). Prosopographisches Lexikon der Palaiologenzeit (in German). Vol. 1. Vienna: Verlag der Österreichischen Akademie der Wissenschaften. ISBN 3-7001-3003-1.
