= Tzamplakon family =

Aristocratic family during the Byzantine Empire

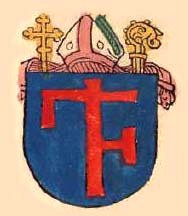
Coat of arms of Gregory Tsamblak according to the Chronicle of the Council of Constance of 1418.

The Tzamplakon family (Greek: Τζαμπλάκων, plural Τζαμπλάκωνες) was an aristocratic family whose members were active in the Byzantine Empire, the Principality of Theodoro, the Republic of Venice, the Second Bulgarian Empire, the Principality of Moldavia, the Serbian Despotate, the Grand Duchy of Lithuania, and the Principality of Kiev.

== Notable members ==
- Alexios Tzamplakon
- Asomatianos Tzamplakon
- Demetrios Tzamplakon
- Cyprian, Metropolitan of Kiev
- Gregory Tsamblak
- John Tsamblak
- Maria of Mangup (Maria Asanina Palaiologina Tzamplakonissa)
