= Anna of Savoy =

Byzantine Empress consort (1306–1365)

- Augusta
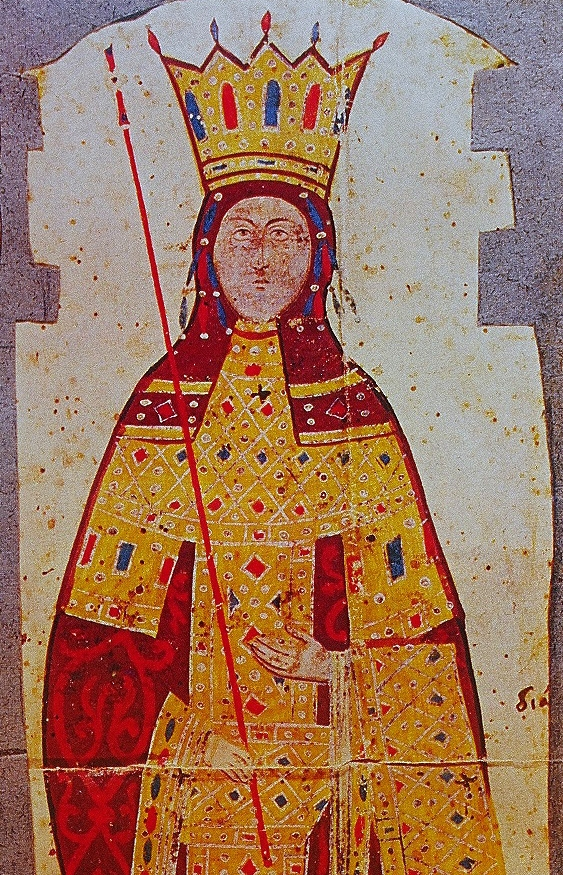

Byzantine Empress consort
- Tenure: 1326–1341

Byzantine regent
- Regency: 1341–1347
- Monarch: John V Palaiologos

Byzantine empress in Thessalonica
- Reign: 1351–1365
- Predecessor: Irene of Montferrat (until 1317)
- Successor: Manuel II Palaiologos (from 1382)
- Born: 1306
- Died: 1365 (aged 58–59); Thessaloniki
- Spouse: Andronikos III Palaiologos
- Issue: Maria (renamed Eirene); John V Palaiologos; Michael Palaiologos; Eirene (renamed Maria)
Regnal name
- Anna Palaiologina
- House: Savoy (by birth); Palaiologos (by marriage)
- Father: Amadeus V, Count of Savoy
- Mother: Maria of Brabant
- Religion: Eastern Orthodox prev. Roman Catholic

Anna of Savoy, born Giovanna (1306–1365), was a Byzantine Empress consort, as the second spouse of Andronikos III Palaiologos. She served as regent, with the titles augusta and autokratorissa, during the minority of her son John V Palaiologos from 1341 until 1347, and later ruled Thessalonica autonomously from 1351. In Byzantium, she was known as Anna Palaiologina, owing to her marriage to Andronikos.

== Life ==
Anna was a daughter of Amadeus V, Count of Savoy, and his second wife, Maria of Brabant. She was betrothed to Andronikos III Palaiologos in September 1325, during which time he was involved in a civil war with his paternal grandfather Andronikos II Palaiologos.

The marriage took place in October 1326. She joined the Eastern Orthodox Church and took the name Anna. In 1328, Andronikos III entered Constantinople and finally deposed his grandfather.

=== Regent ===
On 14-15 June 1341, Andronikos III died. He was succeeded by their son John V who was still three days short of his ninth birthday. Anna was appointed regent for her son. However, Andronikos III had entrusted the administration to his advisor John Kantakouzenos, whom Anna did not trust.

At about the same time, Stefan Uroš IV Dušan of Serbia launched an invasion of Northern Thrace. Kantakouzenos left Constantinople to try to restore order to the area. In his absence, Patriarch John XIV of Constantinople and courtier Alexios Apokaukos convinced Anna that the senior advisor was her enemy. Anna declared Kantakouzenos an enemy of the state and offered the title of eparch of Constantinople to Apokaukos.

On 26 October 1341, Kantakouzenos answered by proclaiming himself emperor at Didymoteicho. He still controlled part of the Byzantine army, and his claim to the throne began a civil war that lasted until 1347. Ivan Alexander of Bulgaria soon allied with the faction under John V and Anna while Stefan Uroš IV Dušan of Serbia sided with John VI. Both rulers were actually taking advantage of the civil war for their own political and territorial gains. In time John VI would ally himself with Orhan I of the nascent Ottoman emirate.

At the same time Anna was attempting to gain support from Western Europe. In Summer, 1343 an emissary proclaimed her loyalty to Pope Clement VI in Avignon. In August, 1343, Anna pawned the Byzantine crown jewels to the Republic of Venice for 30,000 ducats as part of an attempt to secure more finances for the war. However the jewels disappeared and no help was sent. Anna at last lost the war and her supporters deserted her.

On 3 February 1347, the two sides reached an agreement. John VI was accepted as senior emperor with John V as his junior co-ruler. The agreement included the marriage of John V to Helena Kantakouzene, a daughter of Anna. John VI entered Constantinople and took effective control of the city.

=== Later years ===
In 1351, Anna left Constantinople for Thessaloniki. She held her own court in the city, issuing decrees in her name and even controlling a mint. She was the second Byzantine empress to hold court in Thessaloniki, following Irene of Montferrat. Her rule there lasted to about 1365. For some fourteen years she reigned as Empress in Thessalonica, retaining her titles of Augusta and Empress.

Her last official act was the donation of a convent in the memory of Agioi Anargyroi (Greek: «Άγιοι Ανάργυροι» "The Angels Without Money"). Agioi Anargyroi is the joined description of Saints Cosmas and Damian, who supposedly offered free medical services. Their devotees usually pray for healing. The donation may indicate Anna suffering from poor health and hoping for a cure. A little later she became a nun and died under the name "Anastasia" ca. 1365.

== Issue ==
- Maria (renamed Eirene) Palaiologina (1327 – after 1356), who married Michael Asen IV of Bulgaria.
- John V Palaiologos (18 June 1332 – 16 February 1391).
- Michael Palaiologos, despotes (1337 – before 1370). He entered the court of Stefan Uroš IV Dušan of Serbia in 1351/1352.
- Eirene (renamed Maria) Palaiologina (d. 6 August 1384), who married Francesco I of Lesbos.

== Sources ==
- Henry Gardiner Adams, ed. (1857). "Ann of Savoy". A Cyclopaedia of Female Biography: 55. Wikidata Q115751844.
- Barker, John W. (1969). Manuel II Palaeologus (1391-1425): A Study in Late Byzantine Statesmanship. Rutgers University Press.
- Bartusis, Mark C. (1992). The Late Byzantine Army: Arms and Society, 1204-1453. University of Pennsylvania Press.
- Cox, Eugene L. (1967). The Green Count of Savoy. Princeton University Press.
- Herrin, Judith (2009). Byzantium: The Surprising Life of a Medieval Empire. Princeton University Press.
- Nicol, Donald M. (1996). The Byzantine Lady: Ten Portraits, 1250-1500. Cambridge University Press.
- Nicol, Donald M. (1993). The Last Centuries of Byzantium, 1261-1453 (2nd ed.). Cambridge University Press.

Anna of Savoy House of Savoy Born: 1306 Died: 1365
Royal titles
Preceded by Irene of Brunswick	Byzantine Empress consort 1326–1341	Succeeded by Irene Asanina
