= Sybille of Bâgé =

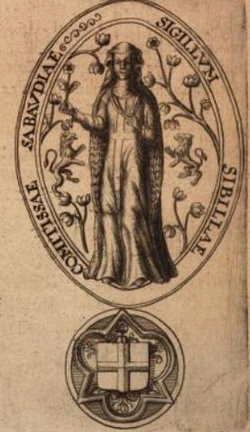
Bull of Sibylla de Bâgé countess of Savoie: sigillum Sibillae comitissae Sabaudiae.

Sybille de Baugé, Lady of Bâgé (1255–1294), was the suo jure Lady of Bâgé and Lady of Bresse in 1255-1294. She was a Countess Consort of Savoy in 1285-1294 by marriage to Amadeus V, Count of Savoy.

== Life ==
She was born to Guy I Damas de Baugé, Baron of Couzan, and Dauphine de Lavieu. Her father died the year of her birth. She inherited the fiefs of her father and became ruling Lady of Bâgé and Lady of Bresse as an infant. Being a minor, her domains were placed under the guardianship of Philip I, Count of Savoy, who acted as her guardian and arranged her marriage with his relative. Her mother remarried Jean of Châtillon-en-Bazois.

On 5 July 1272, at the age of seventeen, she married the future Amadeus V in Lyon. By her marriage, her personal domains of Bâgé and Bresse were eventually to become incorporated in the County of Savoy, with exception of some land which had been donated to some relatives in 1265.

In 1285, her spouse became the heir of Savoy after his uncle. In 1285, her spouse succeeded to the title of Count of Savoy, making Sybille Countess of Savoy. In early 1294, she made her will, with the title Sibilla comitissa Sabaudiæ, dominaque Baugiaci, uxor illustris viri domini Amedei comitis Sabaudiæ.

== Issue ==
Sybille and Amadeus had:

1. Bonne of Savoy, married firstly, John I of Viennois, Dauphin of Viennois, and secondly, Hugh of Burgundy, Lord of Montbauson, the son of Hugh III, Count of Burgundy.
2. John of Savoy
3. Beatrice of Savoy
4. Edward, Count of Savoy
5. Eleonor of Savoy, married: firstly, William of Chalon, Count of Auxerre and Tonnerre; secondly, Dreux IV of Mello; and thirdly, John I, Count of Forez. Her daughter, Marguerite of Mello, married John II of Chalon-Arlay.
6. Margaret of Savoy (d. 1349), married John I of Montferrat
7. Agnes of Savoy (d. 1372), married William III of Geneva. Their son was Amadeus III of Geneva.
8. Aymon, Count of Savoy

== Gallery ==
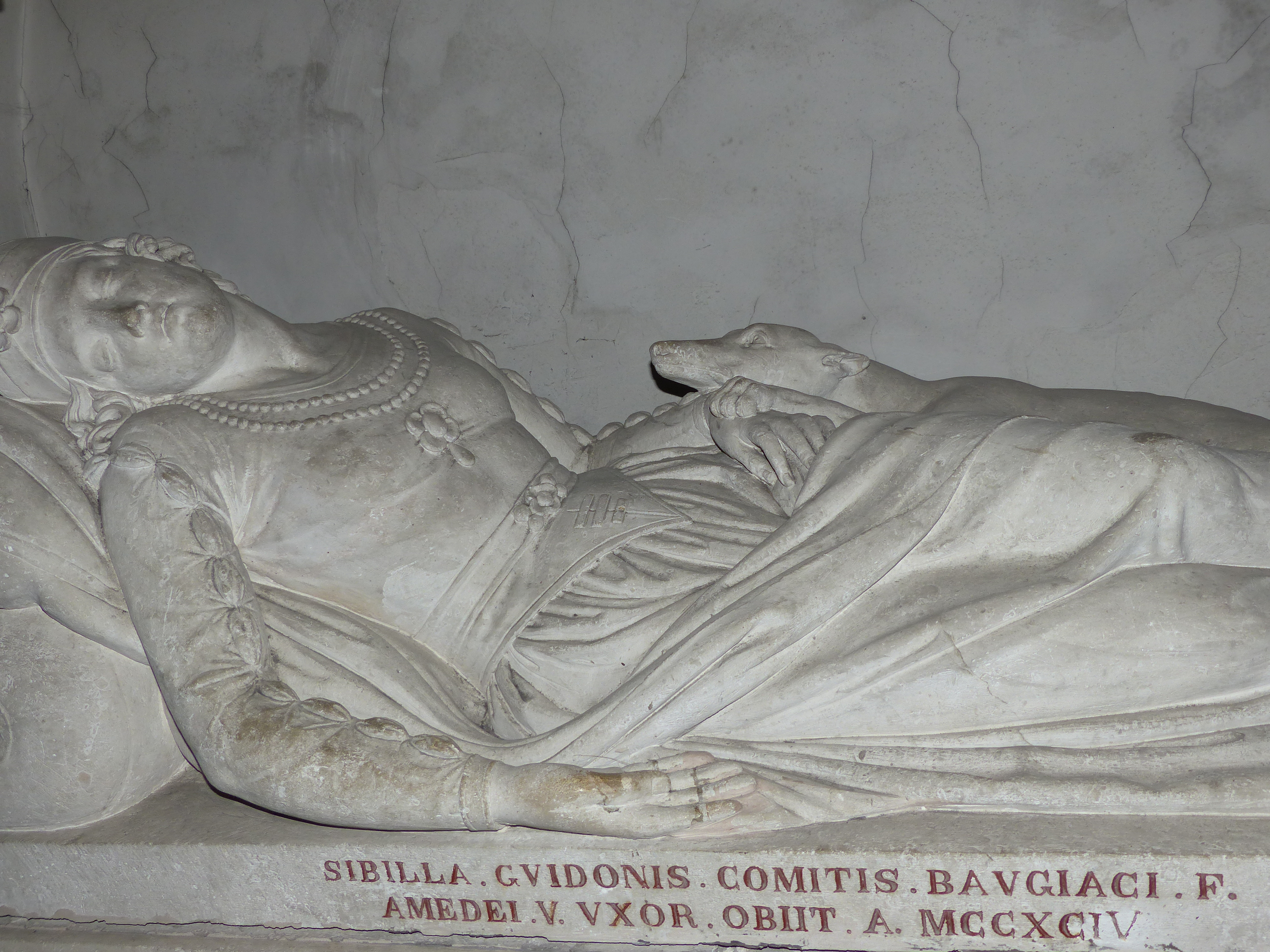
Tomb of Sibylle of Bâgé in Hautecombe Abbey.

== Sources ==
- Cox, Eugene L. (1967). The Green Count of Savoy: Amedeus VI and Transalpine Savoy in the Fourteenth Century. Princeton University Press.

Preceded by Adelaide of Burgundy	Countess consort of Savoy; 1285–1294	Succeeded by Marie of Brabant
