= Battle of Rusokastro =

1332 battle in Bulgaria

Coordinates: 42°28′01″N 27°12′06″E

- Part of the Byzantine–Bulgarian wars
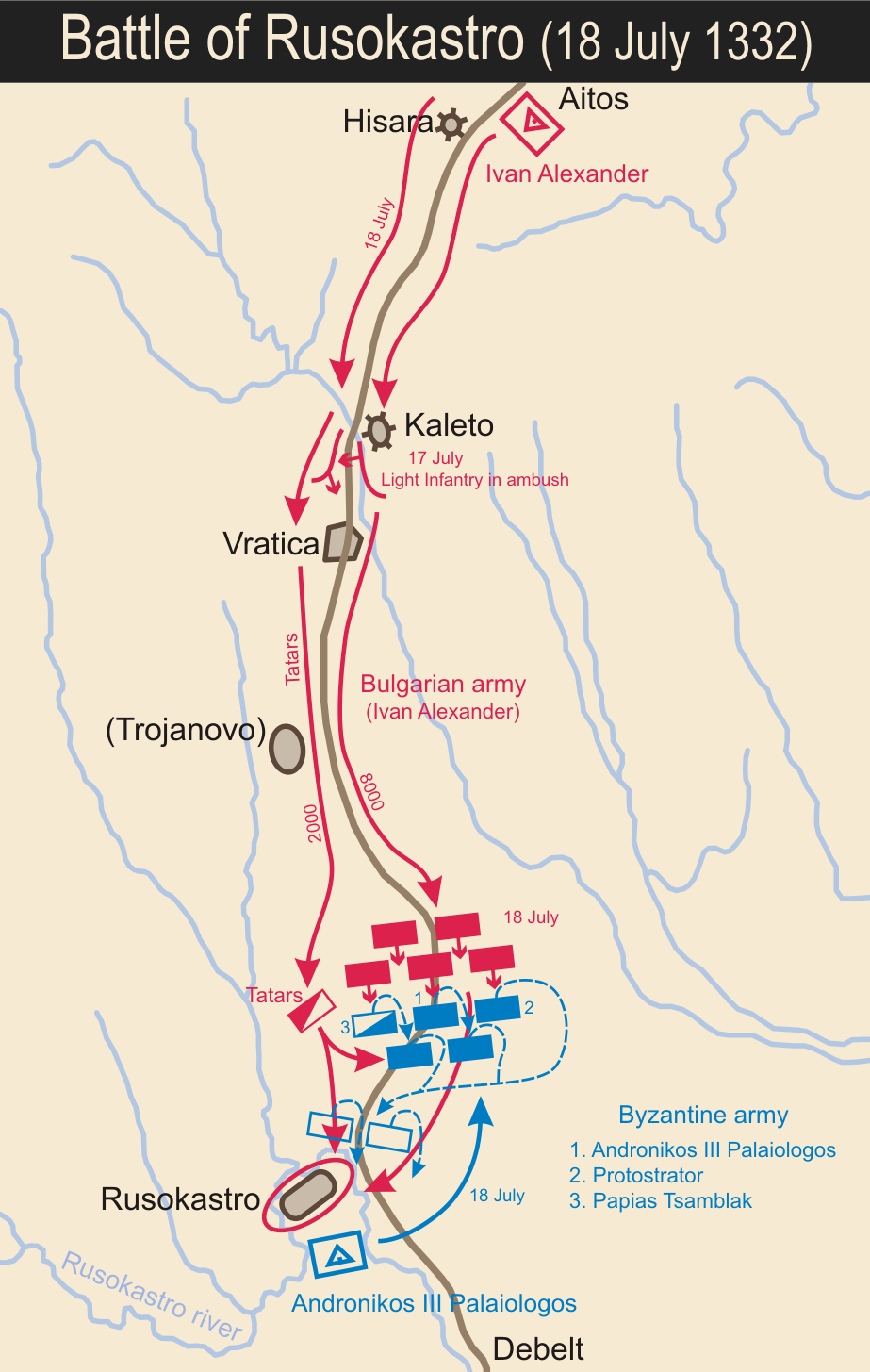
- Battle of Rusokastro
Date	18 July 1332
Location	The village of Rusokastro, Burgas Province, Bulgaria
Result	Bulgarian victory

Belligerents
Bulgarian Empire	Byzantine Empire

Commanders and leaders
Ivan Alexander	Andronikos III; John Kantakouzenos; Alexios Tzamplakon; Manuel Raoul Asen

Strength
10,000; 8,000 Bulgarians and 2,000 Tatar mercenaries	8,000

Casualties and losses
Unknown	Unknown

The Battle of Rusokastro (Bulgarian: Битка при Русокастро, Greek: Μάχη τοῦ Ῥουσοκάστρου) occurred on 18 July 1332 near the village of Rusokastro, Bulgaria, between the armies of the Bulgarian and Byzantine Empires. The outcome was a Bulgarian victory

== Historical background ==
In 1328, the emperors of Bulgaria and Byzantium, Michael Asen III and Andronikos III Palaiologos, signed a secret treaty against Serbia. While Michael Asen III was fighting against the Serbs in 1330, the Byzantines invaded Thrace and captured its Bulgarian towns.

== Prelude ==
The Byzantines were unprepared for war. Their Empire was torn by civil unrest and the army was fighting against the Turks in Asia Minor. In the Bulgarian Empire, there were internecine struggles as well but the new Emperor Ivan Alexander knew that the decisive confrontation with Byzantium was yet to come and decided to improve his relations with the Serbs. In 1332, he concluded a peace treaty with them which lasted till his death. The treaty was secured with a marriage between the Serb king Stefan Dushan and the sister of the Emperor, Elena. In the summer of the same year, the Byzantines gathered an army and without a declaration of war advanced towards Bulgaria, looting and plundering the villages on their way.

The Byzantines seized several castles because Ivan Alexander's attention was focused towards fighting the rebellion of his uncle Belaur in Vidin. He tried to negotiate with the enemy without success. The Emperor decided to act swiftly during the course of five days, when his cavalry covered 230 km to reach Aitos and face the invaders.

== Battle ==
Ivan Alexander had troops of 8,000 while the Byzantines were only 3,000. There were negotiations between the two rulers but the Bulgarian emperor deliberately prolonged them because he was awaiting reinforcements. In the night of 17 July they finally arrived in his camp (3,000 cavalrymen) and he decided to attack the Byzantines the next day. Andronikos III Palaiologos had no choice but to accept the fight. The Byzantine army consisted of 16 squads and six of them made up the first column. The right wing was commanded by the protostrator, the left wing was under the megas papias Alexios Tzamplakon, and the center was commanded personally by the emperor. Together with the emperor were his most trusted nobles John Kantakuzin and Manuel Komnenos Raoul Asen, brother of Irene Asanina.The army formed a wide front in two lines with the flanks positioned behind the center forming a crescent.

The battle began at six in the morning and continued for three hours. The Byzantines tried to prevent the Bulgarian cavalry from surrounding them, but their manoeuvre failed. The cavalry moved around the first Byzantine line, leaving it for the infantry and charged the rear of their flanks. After a fierce fight the Byzantines were defeated, abandoned the battlefield and took refuge in Rusokastro. The Bulgarian army surrounded the fortress and at noon on the same day Ivan Alexander sent envoys to continue the negotiations.

== Aftermath ==
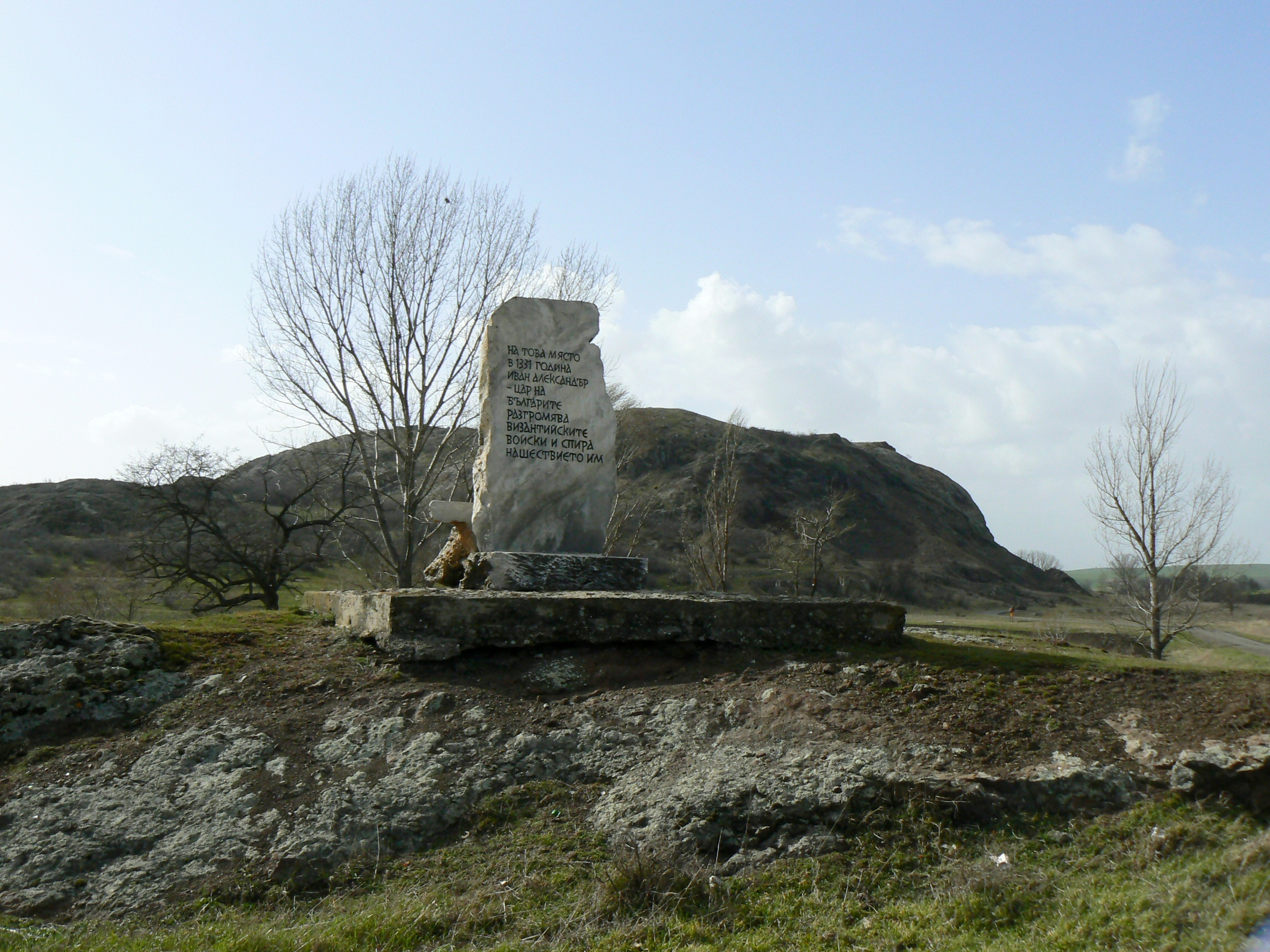
Monument of the Battle of Rusokastro.

The Bulgarians recovered their lost territory in Thrace and strengthened the position of their empire. The eight-year-old son and successor of the Bulgarian emperor Michael Asen was married to the daughter of Andronikos, Maria, cementing the peace between the two states.

This battle was regarded by medieval Bulgarian historians as a great triumph of emperor Ivan Alexander. That was the last major battle between Bulgaria and Byzantium as their seven-century rivalry for domination of the Balkans was soon to come to an end, after the fall of the two Empires under Ottoman domination.

Rusokastro Rock at the north entrance to McFarlane Strait in the South Shetland Islands, Antarctica is named after “the settlement and medieval fortress of Rusokastro in Southeastern Bulgaria.”

== Sources ==
- Andreev, Y.; M. Lalkov (1996). The Bulgarian Khans and Tsars (in Bulgarian). Veliko Tarnovo: Abagar. ISBN 954-427-216-X.
- Clifford Rogers, The Oxford Encyclopedia of Medieval Warfare and Military Technology: Vol. 1, Oxford University Press, 2010
