= John Tsamblak =

Moldavian diplomat during the late 15th century

- Nickname(s): Zuan Tzamplakon; Ioannes Tzamplakon; Zuan Tzamplakon "Palaiologos"

Military service
- Allegiance: Venice; Moldavia

John Tsamblak or Zuan Tzamplakon (Romanian: Ioan Țamblac) was a member of the Tsamblak family, active as diplomat in the service of Moldavia, and as a mercenary (stratioti) leader. He is mentioned in connection with Stephen III's diplomatic missions to the Republic of Venice, and particularly the marriage arrangements with Maria of Mangup. He was nephew of Cyprian, Metropolitan of Kiev, and related to Gregory Tsamblak and, apparently, Cardinal Bessarion.
