= Marie of Brabant, Countess of Savoy =

Marie of Brabant
- Countess consort of Savoy
- Born: 1277/80
- Died: 1338
- Spouse: Amadeus V, Count of Savoy
- Issue: Maria of Savoy; Catherine of Savoy; Anna of Savoy; Beatrice of Savoy
- House: Reginarids
- Father: John I, Duke of Brabant
- Mother: Margaret of Flanders

Marie of Brabant (1277/80–1338) was a Countess Consort of Savoy by marriage to Amadeus V, Count of Savoy. She was the daughter of John I, Duke of Brabant and Margaret of Flanders.

== Life ==
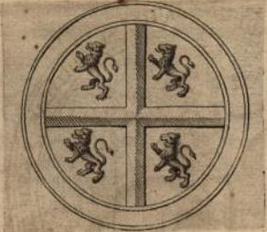

She was engaged to Amadeus after the death of her father. The marriage was arranged when Savoy joined Brabant in an alliance with France against England. A Papal dispensation was obtained in October 1297. The wedding took place at the Château de Chambéry in 1298.

As countess of Savoy, Marie of Brabant appears to have brought with her a certain cultural influence from Brabant, and brought with her several artisans who influenced the court of Savoy, such as her tailor Colin de Brabant. The marriage resulted in close ties between Savoy and Brabant, and gave Brabant closer access to Italy. Marie appears to have had some influence at court, playing a role as diplomat and political adviser.

In 1308, her brother-in-law was elected King of Germany. When her sister and brother-in-law travelled to Italy in 1310, they visited Marie at the court of Savoy in Geneva on their way to Rome.

In 1323, she became a widow. Her spouse was succeeded by Marie's stepson. The exact date of her death is unknown.

== Issue ==
1. Maria of Savoy
2. Catherine of Savoy, d. 1336, married to Leopold I (duke of Austria and Styria)
3. Anna of Savoy, d. 1359, married to Byzantine Emperor Andronikos III Palaiologos
4. Beatrice of Savoy (1310–1331), married in 1327 to Henry VI, Duke of Carinthia, count of Tirol

Preceded by Sybille of Bâgé	Countess of Savoy; 1298–1323	Succeeded by Bianca of Burgundy
