= Amadeus V of Savoy =

Amadeus V
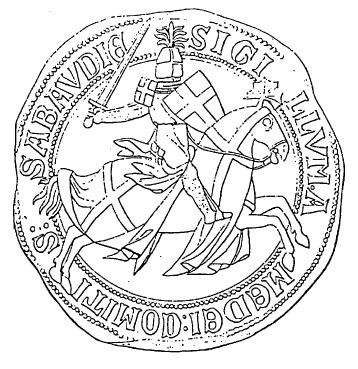
- Seal of Amadeus V

Count of Savoy
- Reign: 1285–1323
- Predecessor: Philip I
- Successor: Edward
- Born: 1252/1253; Le Bourget
- Died: 16 October 1323; Avignon
- Spouse: Sybille of Bâgé; Marie of Brabant
- Issue more...: Edward, Count of Savoy; Aymon, Count of Savoy; Anna, Byzantine Empress
- House: Savoy
- Father: Thomas II of Savoy
- Mother: Beatrice Fieschi

Amadeus V (Italian: Amedeo V di Savoia; 1249 – 16 October 1323), also known as Amadeus the Great (il Conte Grande, 'The Great Count'), was Count of Savoy from 1285 until his death. In recognition of his service to the Holy Roman Empire, he was granted the titles of Imperial Count and Imperial Vicar of Lombardy, along with lordship over Asti and Ivrea.

A prominent medieval ruler, he played a pivotal role in expanding and consolidating the House of Savoy's influence across regions that today form parts of France, Italy, and Switzerland.

== Life ==
Amadeus was the son of Thomas II of Savoy and Beatrice Fieschi. Through his mother he was a grandnephew of Pope Innocent IV. Following his marriage to Sybille of Bâgé in 1272, Amadeus began life in the service of his cousin, King Edward I of England, as a household knight, serving in the First Welsh War of 1277. During the Second Welsh War of 1282, he was in command of Edward's forces at Chester that relieved the siege of Rhuddlan Castle.

His childless paternal uncle, Count Philip I of Savoy, died in 1285. Meanwhile, earlier, in 1282, his elder brother, Thomas III of Piedmont, had accidentally died in 1282. Philip's will charged his niece Eleanor of Provence and her son Edward I of England with the inheritance of Savoy. Amadeus was awarded the County of Savoy, and in order to diminish family rivalry, his younger brother Louis was awarded the new Barony of Vaud, becoming Louis I of Vaud.

Through his marriage to Sybilla, Countess of Bugey and Bresse, he was able to incorporate these Burgundian districts into his states. Later expansion saw his dominions further increased. On 1 October 1285, Amadeus was declared protector of Geneva after negotiations with the Bishop of Geneva. The hereditary title belonged to Amadeus II, Count of Geneva, who was in conflict with the Bishop.

In 1287, Amadeus besieged the castle of Ile in the Rhône near Geneva and captured it after fourteen weeks. In 1295, Amadeus acquired the fortress at Chambéry from its previous owner Hugh of La Rochette. He brought Georges de Aquila, a student of Giotto from Florence, to his court. Georges decorated the castle with paintings, carved wood, and frescoes. He worked there for the Savoyards until he died in 1348.

Military victories over the Amadeus II of Geneva and Humbert I Dauphin of Viennois, leading to the occupation of the city of Geneva in June 1287, led to the Treaty of Annemasse signed on 18 November 1287, whereby they submitted themselves as his vassals. During the 1294–1303 Gascon War, he acted as an agent of King Edward I of England in the negotiations that led to the 1299 Treaty of Montreuil and the 1303 Treaty of Paris; separately, he arranged for the marriage of Edward I with Margaret of France. In 1301, Amadeus also settled his dispute over control of Valais with the Roman Catholic Diocese of Sion. His reign, however, also saw friction between the County of Savoy and the Duchy of Austria. He pursued an alliance with the Kingdom of France and received Maulévrier in Normandy as a result of initial good relations.

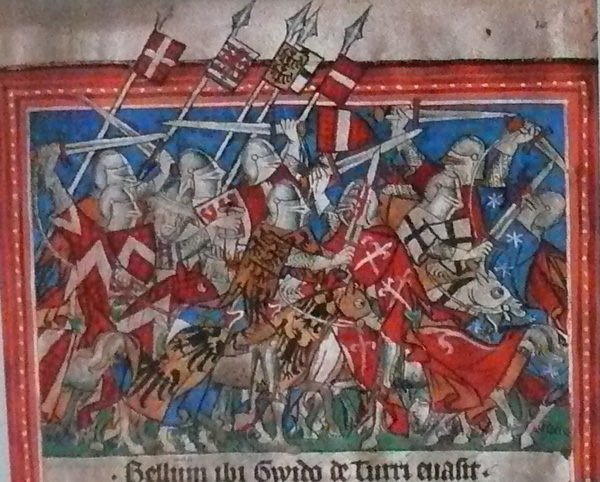
Amadeus as one of the combatants defeating the Torriani revolt in Milan (12 February 1311)

The eventual recovery of Lyon by the kings of France alerted Amadeus to their expansionistic tendencies towards the regions by the Alps. He sought a powerful ally against potential hostility in the German king Henry VII, who was married to Margaret of Brabant, the sister-in-law of Amadeus. Amadeus accompanied Henry in his Italian campaign of 1310–1313, which culminated in Henry's coronation as Holy Roman Emperor on 29 June 1312. As a reward for his service, Amadeus received the title of Imperial Count, imperial vicar of Lombardy, and the lordships of Asti and Ivrea. Henry also elevated Aosta and Chablais to duchies, though they remained a part of the realm of Savoy.

In 1315, Amadeus assisted the Knights Hospitaller in the defense of Rhodes against the Turks. He died in Avignon on 16 October 1323.

== Family and children ==
He first married Sybille de Baugé, daughter of Guy I Damas de Baugé, Baron of Couzan (c.1230–1269) and Dauphine de Lavieu, and had eight children by her:

1. Bonne of Savoy, married twice: 1) John I of Viennois, Dauphin of Viennois, 2) Hugh of Burgundy, Lord of Montbauson, the son of Hugh III, Count of Burgundy.
2. John of Savoy (*1284–?)
3. Beatrice of Savoy (*1291–1294), in 1291 fiancée promises marriage to Count William III of Geneva, eventually the contract was annulled, William married her younger sister Agnes.
4. Edward of Savoy (d. 1329), succeeded his father, and married Blanche of Burgundy, daughter of Robert II, Duke of Burgundy.
5. Eleonor of Savoy (d. after 1317), married three times: 1) William of Chalon, Count of Auxerre and Tonnerre, 2) Dreux IV of Mello, and 3) John I, Count of Forez. Her daughter Marguerite de Mello married John II of Chalon-Arlay.
6. Margaret of Savoy (d. 1349), married John I of Montferrat.
7. Agnes of Savoy (d. 1322), married William III of Geneva. Their son was Amadeus III of Geneva.
8. Aymon of Savoy (d. 1343), succeeded his brother Edward as Count of Savoy, and married Yolande of Montferrat, the daughter of Theodore I, Marquess of Montferrat.

In 1297, he married, secondly, Marie of Brabant, who was a daughter of John I, Duke of Brabant and Margaret of Flanders. Her maternal grandparents were Guy of Dampierre and his first wife, Matilda of Bethune. They had 4 children:

1. Maria of Savoy, married Hugh, Baron of Faucigny, the son of Humbert I of Viennois.
2. Catherine of Savoy (d. 1336), married Leopold I, Duke of Austria and Styria.
3. Anna of Savoy (d. 1359), married Byzantine Emperor Andronikos III Palaiologos.
4. Beatrice of Savoy (1310–1331), married, in 1327, Henry VI, Duke of Carinthia.

Amadeus V House of Savoy Born: 4 September 1249 Died: 16 October 1323
Regnal titles
Preceded by Philip I	Count of Savoy; 1285–1323	Succeeded by Edward
