= Alexios Tzamplakon =

Alexios Tzamplakon (Greek: Ἀλέξιος Τζαμπλάκων, fl. 1317–1332) was a Byzantine aristocrat and high official.

== Life ==
The Tzamplakones were an important and wealthy aristocratic family attested since the mid-13th century, when one of its members achieved the high military rank of Domestic of the Schools. Alexios was this man's son.

He is first attested in 1317, in the service of Emperor Andronikos II Palaiologos (r. 1282–1328). He is then mentioned in 1326, when he held the dignity of megas tzaousios and the post of governor (kephale) of the city of Serres and the region of Popolia south of Mount Pangaion in Macedonia. In the civil war between Andronikos II and his grandson Andronikos III (r. 1328–1341), Tzamplakon initially sided with the elder Andronikos, but in 1327 changed sides, and was rewarded with a promotion to megas papias and the governorship of Zichne.

In July 1331/1332, Tzamplakon commanded the Byzantine army's left wing in the defeat at Rhosokastron against the Bulgarians. In November 1332, in his last known act as megas papias, he co-signed a treaty with Venice. Shortly thereafter, and having already some time before adopted the monastic name Antony, he retired to a monastery where he lived out his days. The date of his death is unknown, but was probably after 1334.

== Family ==
Alexios Tzamplakon had four known children, three sons and a daughter:

- Asomatianos, who became megas doux (commander of the Byzantine navy)
- Arsenios, who also became a megas papias
- Demetrios, who became megas stratopedarches (a senior military rank)
- an unnamed daughter, who married a member of the Tornikes family

== Sources ==
- Guilland, Rodolphe (1967). Recherches sur les institutions byzantines [Studies on the Byzantine Institutions]. Berliner byzantinische Arbeiten 35 (in French). Vol. I. Berlin and Amsterdam: Akademie-Verlag & Adolf M. Hakkert. OCLC 878894516.
- Kazhdan, Alexander, ed. (1991). The Oxford Dictionary of Byzantium. Oxford and New York: Oxford University Press. ISBN 0-19-504652-8.
- Trapp, Erich; Beyer, Hans-Veit; Kaplaneres, Sokrates; Leontiadis, Ioannis (1991). "27748. Τζαμπλάκων Ἀλέξιος". Prosopographisches Lexikon der Palaiologenzeit (in German). Vol. 11. Vienna: Verlag der Österreichischen Akademie der Wissenschaften. ISBN 3-7001-3003-1.
