= Keroularios =

Keroularios (Greek: Κηρουλάριος), Latinized as Cerularius, is a Greek surname. It was the name of an influential Byzantine family active during the 11th century.

Notable individuals with the surname Keroularios include:

- Michael I Cerularius (c. 1000 – 21 January 1059), Ecumenical Patriarch of Constantinople from 1043 to 1058; played a major role in the 11th century Great Schism
- Constantine Keroularios (fl. 11th century), Byzantine official
