= Basil Apokaukos =

Basil Apokaukos or Apokauchos (Greek: Βασίλειος Ἀπόκαυκος/Ἀπόκαυχος) was a Byzantine governor of the Peloponnese at the turn of the 11th century.

Basil is chiefly mentioned in the hagiography of Saint Nikon the Metanoeite. He probably hailed from the Peloponnese and is the first recorded member of the Apokaukos family, most of whose members were active in later centuries. It is however possible, based on the comments added by Bishop Michael of Deabolis to the history of John Skylitzes, that he was actually a member of the Apokapes family, and that the two families were one and the same.

According to the hagiography of St. Nikon, in 996 he was praetor (civil governor under the thematic strategos) of the Theme of the Peloponnese at Corinth, when he was called upon to take over the guard at the Isthmus of Corinth and prevent the Bulgarian Tsar Samuel, who had invaded Greece, from entering the Peloponnese. Basil had been supposedly seized by great fear at this prospect, and sent for Nikon, who successfully "healed" him from it. Some time after Nikon's death in 1000, Basil had advanced to strategos himself—evidently of the Peloponnese—and visited his grave, where he prayed. Two of his sons, Gregoras and an unnamed one, were captured at an unknown point by the Bulgarians, and were only set free in 1014 by Emperor Basil II.

== Sources ==
- Lilie, Ralph-Johannes; Ludwig, Claudia; Pratsch, Thomas; Zielke, Beate (2013). Prosopographie der mittelbyzantinischen Zeit Online. Berlin-Brandenburgische Akademie der Wissenschaften. Nach Vorarbeiten F. Winkelmanns erstellt (in German). Berlin and Boston: De Gruyter.
