= Maria of Mangup =

Maria of Mangup (Maria Asanina Palaiologina)
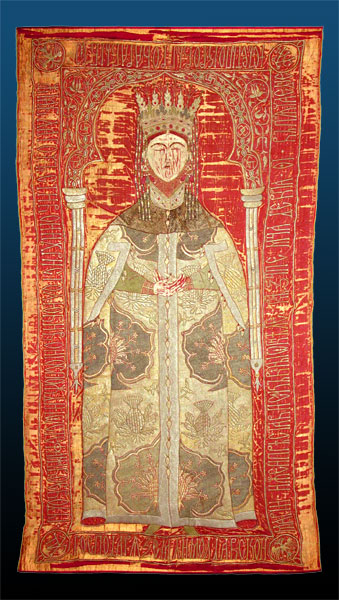
- Burial shroud in the Putna Monastery

Princess consort of Moldavia
- Tenure: 14 September 1472 – 1475 or 1477
- Predecessor: Evdochia of Kiev
- Successor: Maria Voichița
- Died: 19 December 1477
- Burial: Putna Monastery, Suceava County, Romania
- Spouse: Stephen the Great
- Issue: Ana; Other 3 or 4 children?
- House: Theodoro; Asen; Palaiologos
- Father: Olubei?
- Mother: Maria Tzamplakina Palaiologina Asanina?
- Religion: Eastern Catholicism (to ca. 1475); Eastern Orthodoxy (ca. 1475–1477)

Maria Asanina Palaiologina (Greek: Μαρία Ασανίνα Παλαιολογίνα, died 19 December 1477), better known as Maria of Mangup or Maria of Doros, was the princess consort of Moldavia from September 1472 to 1475 or 1477 as the second wife of Stephen the Great. Of uncertain parentage, but most likely a descendant of imperial Bulgarian and Byzantine dynasties, she belonged to the ruling class of the small Principality of Theodoro in Crimea. Her close relatives included both warring princes of Theodoro, Alexios II and Isaac, as well as Zuan Tzamplakon, diplomat and leader of Stratioti.

With her arrival in Moldavia, Maria underscored the relative impact of Byzantine politics and culture at Stephen's court. She also accepted Byzantine communion with the Catholics, acting as an agent of Catholic influence before returning to Eastern Orthodoxy. Stephen likely married her for political reasons, hoping to conquer the principality, though he lost interest in her when that proved impossible. According to conflicting readings, the Prince either divorced her to marry the Wallachian Maria Voichița (who in any case became her successor), or she lived estranged from Stephen without a formal separation. Her portrait is mysteriously absent from a miniature of the Humor Monastery Gospel, possibly removed by her husband.

Various late records place Maria Asanina in Eastern Moldavia or on Mount Athos. Her marriage to Stephen had produced as many as five children, of whom only one daughter, Ana, is believed to have survived into adulthood. Maria's elaborate burial shroud, featuring her portrait and Palaiologan insignia, is preserved in Putna Monastery, where she was buried. It endures as a significant landmark in medieval Romanian art, synthesizing Western and Eastern handicrafts. Maria's marriage was fictionalized by Mihail Sadoveanu in Frații Jderi. This 1935 novel is the basis for a 1974 feature film, in which Maria was portrayed by Violeta Andrei.

== Biography ==
=== Origins ===
A daughter of the ruler of the Principality of Theodoro (or "Gothia") in the Crimea, on her mother's side she was a likely descendant of two imperial houses, the Palaiologos dynasty of the Byzantine Empire and the Asen dynasty of the Second Bulgarian Empire. Scholars such as Ivan Bozhilov argue that, on her father's side, Maria also descended from the Gabras aristocratic family of Byzantium. This is dismissed as "groundless" by another historian, Ștefan S. Gorovei, who notes that Maria's blood links with the Palaiologos and the Byzantine branch of the Asenids were likely strong. She is mentioned in the Gustynskaia Chronicle as cousins ("second sisters") with Sophia Palaiologina of Muscovy. Through this connection, she was probably a niece of Trebizond's reigning couple, Emperor David and Empress Maria. Historians such as A. D. Xenopol, Orest Tafrali, and Constantin Gane also held the belief that Maria was a Komnenid. The notion was preserved in later academia by Răzvan Theodorescu, who sees Maria as having "the blood of Greek basileis, Komnenes and Palaiologoi". According to Octavean-Radu Ivan, she "had tight connections" with the Komnenids through the Trebizond dynasty.

Beyond his being a Prince of Theodoro, her father's exact identity is disputed among historians. According to Aurelian Sacerdoțeanu, such mentions of Theodoro refer to Olubei, son of Alexios I. Bozhilov describes Maria as the daughter of either Olubei or his direct predecessor John, who was married to a Maria Tzamplakina Palaiologina Asanina. Similarly, genealogist Marcel Romanescu lists her as the daughter of "John Olubei" and "Maria Asen Palaiologos", and Xenopol simply as Oludbei's daughter. Gane refers to "Maria's father, Olobei Comnen". Alexander Vasiliev sees her as a sister of Isaac, who was probably Olubei's son, and of Alexios II. A more skeptical view was offered in 1981 by historian D. Năstase, who believed that Maria was the daughter of a lesser Byzantine refugee in the Republic of Venice, Zuan Tzamplakon "Palaiologos". Her "imperial ascendancy, real or fake, was nonetheless Byzantine." According to Gorovei, Tzamplakon was in reality one of Maria's uncles, and himself not a full member of the Palaiologos clan.

Maria of Mangup's parents left for Trebizond in 1446 or 1447, which leaves her apparent presence in Mangup until her move to Suceava and marriage unexplained. Moldavia's German Chronicle, compiled late during Stephen's reign, links Maria with the Caucasus, describing her as a "Circassian". This remark, Vasiliev notes, is "completely obscure", with no other record substantiating the "Circassian" claim. He proposes that such a confusion in the text might be connected to the "not very reliable" story according to which some "Gothic" princes had settled in Phanagoria. In 1999, genealogist Sorin Iftimi noted that the statement in the German Chronicle had still not been elucidated by historians.

As recounted by Vasiliev, Maria arrived in Moldavia on 4 September 1472. However, other scholars place the event almost a full year before that, to 14 September 1471. The marriage, which took place on 14 September 1472, was probably contracted for political reasons. As noted by historian Constantin Iordachi, her presence in Moldavia formed part of a "multifaceted influence" of post-Byzantine polities, which at that phase was still "direct". The dynastic union also had advantages for the Moldavian side: according to Gane, Stephen "struck big". Another researcher, Alexandru Simon, notes that the matrimonial arrangement "had [...] fortified [Stephen's] position and interests in the Black Sea area", while also annulling a previous submission to the Ottoman Empire. One scholarly theory, embraced by both Vasiliev and Tafrali, suggests that Stephen, a powerful ruler and "Athlete of Christ", married Maria in order to be able to lay claim on the throne of Byzantium should Constantinople be retaken from the Ottoman Turks. This interpretation was rejected by various other scholars.

=== Princess consort of Moldavia ===
The Princess was also involved in the conflict of influence over Stephen and his Moldavian Metropolis. By the time of her move to Moldavia, Maria and her Theodoro relatives supported the attempted Catholic–Orthodox union and its Latin Patriarchate of Constantinople, being especially close to Basilios Bessarion. The project also involved John, the Metropolitan of Gothia, who networked between Theodoro, Moldavia, and the Kingdom of Hungary. Zuan Tzamplakon, who had negotiated Maria's marriage to Stephen, also acted as Bessarion's personal envoy. With Maria, he managed to steer Stephen closer to the Catholic world. As noted by scholar Dan Ioan Mureșan, Tzamplakon and Maria's work may have strained Stephen's relationship with the Orthodox Patriarch of Constantinople and the local church hierarchy, including Bishop Teoctist. This, he argues, is why Maria appears as a blank space in the Gospel of Humor Monastery: "the monk Nicodim [...] simply refused to depict [Stephen's] new wife". Other researches believe that Maria was painted in that miniature, but then erased on Stephen's orders.

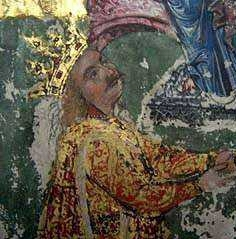
Page of the Humor Monastery Gospel, showing Stephen the Great without his wife

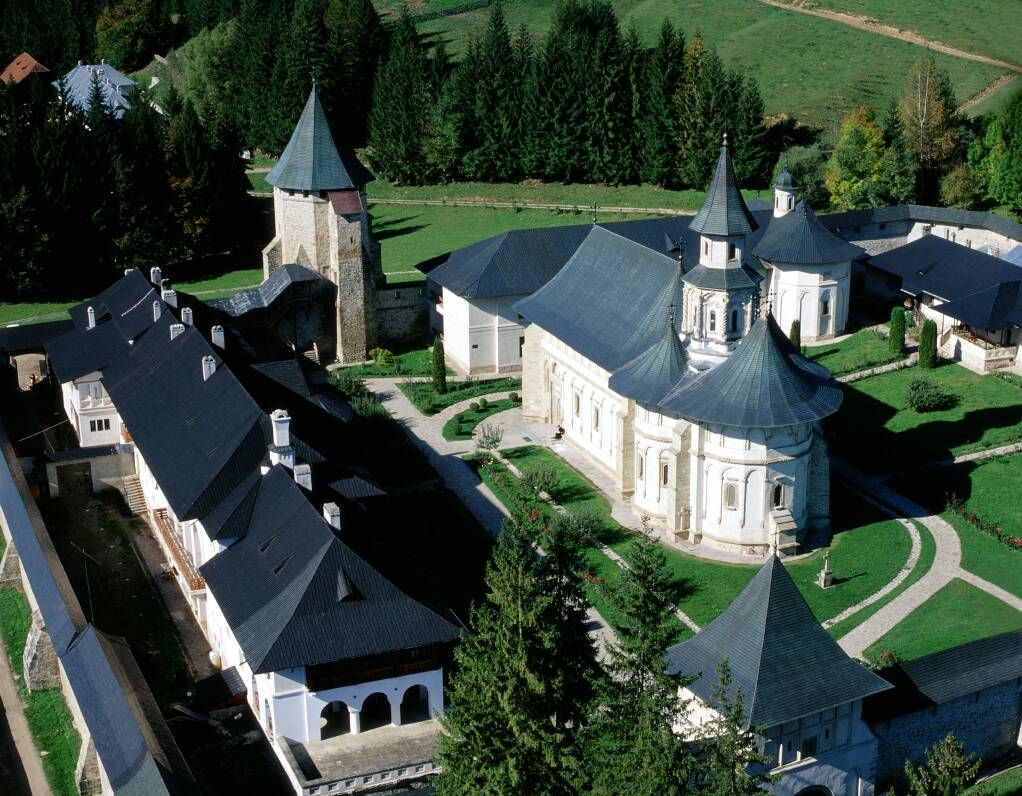
Putna Monastery, Maria of Mangup's burial site

According to Gane, Stephen had no children by Maria. Other sources confirm that the couple had two daughters, one of whom was probably named Ana; the other one remains anonymous, only known through two references in the German Chronicle. Sacerdoțeanu also proposes that Maria was the mother of two sons, the twins Bogdan (ca. 1473–1479) and Iliaș, and possibly a third, Petrașco, all of whom are buried at Putna Monastery. Gane describes Bogdan and Petrașco as born to Evdochia of Kiev, Stephen's previous wife, and Iliaș as born from an even earlier marriage. According to Gorovei, Maria acted as tutor to Alexandru "Sandrin", Evdochia's son, and may have inspired the young heir's interest in Asenid family history.

Stephen was angered when the Theodoro Byzantines accepted Ottoman and Crimean Khanate overlords, and negotiated an alliance with the Republic of Genoa, which held Caffa, on the other side of the peninsula. He also equipped an expedition which saw Isaac deposed and replaced with the anti-Ottoman Alexios II. Stephen's marriage, Vasiliev notes, allowed him to exercise "exceptional influence on Gothia", and he was "perhaps [considering] even taking possession" of Theodoro. The latter is also argued by Xenopol and Gane. Both Xenopol and Vasiliev note Stephen's alarm in June 1475, when Caffa fell to the Ottomans. Overall, however, Maria appears to have been largely ignored by her husband and led an unhappy family life until her death, some two years later.

Xenopol suggests that, shortly into their marriage, Stephen had fallen in love with his hostage Maria Voichița, daughter of Radu III the Handsome of Wallachia. The same is argued by Gane, who further speculates that a "horrific drama must have taken place in the citadel of Suceava, and many tears must have been shed by the Lady in her quarters." Xenopol and Vasiliev both argue that Stephen lost any interest in Maria once Theodoro was conquered by the Ottomans in December 1475 and he had abandoned his hopes of capturing the Crimean principality. A Genoese record suggests that in May 1476 Stephen was trying to obtain an amnesty for Alexios, who was ultimately executed by his Ottoman captors.

=== Apparent withdrawal and death ===
The fall of Theodoro was a final chapter in the efforts to make Stephen embrace Catholicism. In her final years, as Mureșan notes, Maria of Mangup had returned into the fold of Constantinople Orthodoxy. Tradition credits her as one of the donors of Neamț Monastery, with an icon of the Theotokos (Virgin and Child). Various records also suggest that she was living in solitude, away from the court. In July 1476, as the Crimean Khanate invaded Eastern Moldavia, Maria was recorded among the refugees at Khotyn or Costești. According to oral tradition, she lived in the Costești cave now known as Stânca Doamnei (Lady's Cliff). Other records suggest that she returned to Suceava following Stephen's defeat at Valea Albă, still acting as his faithful wife and inquiring about his whereabouts.

An undated inscription in the katholikon (main church) of the Osiou Gregoriou monastery on Mount Athos mentions that "the most pious Maria Asanina Palaiologina, lady of Moldovlachia" prayed there during her time as Princess consort. This offering may nevertheless refer not to Maria of Mangop, but to her posthumous daughter-in-law by Sandrin, known from other records simply as a Phanariote aristocrat. A "lady Maria" appears mentioned in an undated letter sent by the Orthodox Patriarch. Mureșan argues that this friendly text refers to her husband, rather than to a previous Prince Stephen, as has been argued by other experts, but concedes that "lady Maria" may not be Maria of Mangop. He dates the text to a generic period when Stephen had reaffirmed his Byzantine Orthodoxy.

According to her tombstone at Putna, Maria died on 19 December "6985" (Anno Mundi), which various historians read as AD 1477. Scholar Petre Ș. Năsturel explains that earlier readings as "1476" were based on the false assumption that the Moldavian year began on 1 September rather than 1 January. Likewise, Gane concludes that the event took place during the fasting for Christmas Eve 1477, and describes "1476" as an anomalous reading. The princess' funeral service was delivered by Teoctist, who had apparently reconciled with her.

Stephen took for his third wife Maria Voichița—who was herself related, more distantly, to the Palaiologoi. According to Xenopol, the chronicler Grigore Ureche is right to argue that Stephen had taken the new Maria as his wife as early as 1475, since he and Maria of Mangop were effectively divorced by then. The German Chronicle records this new wedding as having occurred in December 1477, which, if true, would have broken the widower's mourning taboo. Various scholars agree that the text must be in this respect erroneous. Gane also pushes the date for Stephen's new marriage to 1480, "whether because he wished to mourn properly, or because [Maria Voichița] was still too young". Tzamplakon probably left Moldavia shortly before or after his protector's death, returning to fight for Venice and leading her Stratioti in the War of Ferrara. Of Maria's putative children, Ana survived to at least 1499, and is believed to have been entombed by Sandrin's side at Bistrița Monastery.

== In culture ==
Kept at Putna, now located in Romania, Maria of Mangup's elaborate burial shroud bears the following inscription, embroidered in Cyrillic:

Cyrillic	English
† Съ єстъ покровь гроба рабы бѡжꙗ благочъстивои и Христолюбивои госпожди Іѡ[анна] Стєфана воєводы господарѧ зємли молдавскои Маріи, пжє и прѣстависѧ къ вѣчным ѡбитѣлєм лѣт[є] ЅЧИЕ мє[сє]ца д[є]кєвріа ѲІ въ п[арас]к[євьи]ѧ ча[с] є днє	† This is the cover of the tomb of the servant of God, the pious and Christ-loving lady of John Stephen, voivode of the Land of Moldavia, Maria, who passed away to [her] eternal dwelling in the year 1476 [sic], on the 19th [day] of the month of December, Friday, at the fifth hour of the day

Fashion historian Jennifer M. Scarce reviews the shroud as the first sample of an "apparently unique" theme in Romanian religious handicrafts, with "the dead person richly dressed in court robes." The embroidery features two monograms reading "Asanina" and "Palaiologina" and two double-headed eagles, a symbol of Byzantium, in each of the four corners. As argued by historian Hugo Buchtal, the eagle and other elements of Palaiologan insignia are there to underscore Maria's Byzantine heritage and "imperial program". The shroud, sewn of red silk and with gold thread embroidery, depicts the Princess consort lying within an arch in her tomb in a blue-grey ceremonial garment decorated with stylized flowers and a high crown and pendants on her head. Năsturel describes the central figurative image as a "discreet evocation of the past, though one of painful solitude."

Art historian Ernst Diez considers this to be the earliest burial shroud portrait discovered in a Romanian monastery as well as "harmonious" and "the most beautiful one in the group" he analyzed. The shroud measures 1.88 by 1.02 metres (6.2 by 3.3 feet). Stylistically, it belongs to Byzantine art, though with some Western influences, bringing together echoes of Gothic art and Islamic geometric patterns. Scarce also notes that costume worn by Maria is a sample of Ottoman clothing, the zerbaft, "probably the earliest" such depiction in Romanian art. Additionally, art historians Lilia Dergaciova and Svetlana Reabțeva discuss the influence of Mongol handicrafts in her jewelry, proposing that Maria may have ordered Moldavian artisans to learn Crimean techniques.

Researcher Anca Păunescu praises this "unique work" and "masterpiece" of "wide-ranging humanist inspiration". The shroud, she notes, attests "the greatest phase of magnificence in Moldavian-style embroidery", and through it the political and cultural stability enforced by Stephen. According to Năsturel, the shroud's very existence shows that a "refined civilization [...] of the Byzantine world had come to flourish at Stephen's court". Similarly, Theodorescu sees the object as evidence of a "multicultural Romanian world", an "aesthetic mutation" serving Stephen's "geopolitics". The depiction of double-headed eagles and a "princely cortege" on a period stove from Vaslui has led some researches to suggest that Maria's imperial pedigree had also seeped into folk art. Their hypothesis remains controversial. Another dispute surrounds the presence of a heraldic sun in some of Stephen's princely arms. Heraldist Grigore Jitaru proposes that it stands for the Theodoro marriage, but his hypothesis was rejected by another scholar, Tudor-Radu Tiron.

Maria is also the subject of several portrayals in Romanian literature and related media. Her wedding to Stephen forms a major episode in Mihail Sadoveanu's 1935 novel, Frații Jderi. Her welcoming to Moldavia is meant to highlight Stephen's patriotism and his guarantees of tranquility: the fictional Maria is overwhelmed by feelings of "peace and leisure" upon first meeting him. Depicted as a political act by Sadoveanu, the wedding ceremony also overlaps with Stephen's hunting trip and initiation by a hermit. The novel has inspired a 1974 film, in which Maria is played by Violeta Andrei, with Gheorghe Cozorici as Stephen. Another interwar writer, Ana Bucur, also contributed a historical play entirely centered on Maria's life in Moldavia. In 2013, the princess' biography inspired a song by Maria Gheorghiu. This was later included into a musical, Sub zodia Mariei ("Under the Sign of Mary"), which also featured Gheorghiu's homages to Marie of Romania and Maria Tănase.

== Sources ==
- Bădulescu, Marina; Simionescu, Mihai (2015-10-31). "Spectacolul Sub zodia Mariei, în premieră, într-un nou concept, cu Maria Gheorghiu". Agerpres. Archived from the original on 2017-09-12.
- Batariuc, Paraschiva-Victoria (2013). "Arme, armuri, piese de harnașament ilustrate pe cahle descoperite în Moldova. Secolele XV–XVII". Arheologia Moldovei. XXIX: 125–151. ISSN 0066-7358.
- Bozhilov, Ivan (1994). Фамилията на Асеневци (1186–1460). Генеалогия и просопография. Publishing House of the Bulgarian Academy of Sciences. ISBN 954-430-264-6.
- Călușer, Iudita (2010). "Donația familiei Ștefănică din Beiuș". Revista Crisia. 40: 343–351. ISSN 1016-2798.
- Cazacu, Matei (1996). "Stratégies matrimoniales et politiques des Cantacuzène sous la Turcocratie (XVe–XVIe s.)". Revue des Études Roumaines. XIX–XX: 157–181. ISSN 0556-7637.
- Dergaciova, Lilia; Reabțeva, Svetlana (2016). "Aplice în formă de 'floare arabă' în vestimentația de gală din sec. XIV-XVI". Revista Arheologică. XII (1–2): 216–228. ISSN 1857-016X.
- Diez, Ernst (1928). "Moldavian Portrait Textiles". The Art Bulletin. 10 (4): 377–385. doi:10.1080/00043079.1928.11409574.
- Epure, Adrian (2017-03-12). ""Din culisele cinematografiei". Cum au fost recreate războaiele lui Ștefan cel Mare pe marele ecran: "Frații Jderi m-a scăpat de armată!"". Adevărul. Archived from the original on 2017-04-20.
- Eșanu, Diana-Maria (2012). "Daniile și ctitoriile femeilor din familiile domnești în Moldova medievală. O încercare de tipologizare". Buletinul Cercurilor Științifice Studențești (17–18): 49–69. ISSN 1454-8097.
- Găină, Radu (2007). "Uniunea ratată". Magazin Istoric. XLI (4): 87–90. ISSN 0541-881X.
- Gane, Constantin (1932). Trecute vieți de doamne și domnițe. Vol. I. Luceafărul S. A.
- Golubițchi, Silvia (2006). "Perpetuarea valorilor naționale ca principiu al educației populare în romanul Frații Jderi". Didactica Pro…, Revistă de Teorie și Practică Educaţională (5–6): 55–58. ISSN 1810-6455.
- Gorovei, Ștefan S. (1974). "Puncte de vedere. O biografie nescrisă: Alexandru Voievod". Magazin Istoric. VIII (2): 14–17. ISSN 0541-881X.
- Gorovei, Ștefan S. (2006). "Maria Asanina Paleologhina, doamna Moldovlahiei (II)". Studii și Materiale de Istorie Medie. XIV: 55–80. ISSN 1222-4766.
- Iftimi, Sorin (1999). "Domni români și soțiile lor din Caucaz". Magazin Istoric. XXXIII (7): 78–81. ISSN 0541-881X.
- Iordachi, Constantin (2013). "From Imperial Entanglements to National Disentanglement: the 'Greek Question' in Moldavia and Wallachia, 1611–1863". In Roumen Daskalov, Tchavdar Marinov (ed.). Entangled Histories of the Balkans. Volume One: National Ideologies and Language Policies. BRILL. pp. 67–148. ISBN 9789004250765.
- Ivan, Octavean-Radu (August 2015). "I valacchi ed il Concilio di Ferrara—Firenze (1438-1439)". Caiete Critice (8): 65–74. ISSN 1220-6350.
- Mănicuță, Cornelia (2004). "Ștefan cel Mare. Evocare istorică și mit romantic". Codrul Cosminului (10): 79–91. ISSN 1224-032X.
- Mureșan, Dan Ioan (2008). "Patriarhia de Constantinopol și Ștefan cel Mare. Drumul sinuos de la surse la interpretare". In Muntean, V. V. (ed.). In memoriam Alexandru Elian. Omagiere postumă a reputatului istoric și teolog, la zece ani de la trecerea sa în veșnicie (8 ianuarie 1998). Timișoara Archbishopric. pp. 87–179. ISBN 978-9738970083.
- Năstase, D. (1981). "L'idée impériale dans les pays Roumains et le "crypto-empire chrétien" sous la domination ottomane. État et importance du problème". Byzantina Symmeikta. IV: 201–250. doi:10.12681/byzsym.673. ISSN 1105-1639.
- Năsturel, Petre Ș. (1960). "Date noi asupra unor odoare de la mănăstirea Putna. II". Romanoslavica. IV: 267–288. ISSN 0557-272X.
- Păunescu, Anca (2004). "29. Epitaphios with Maria of Mangop". In Helen C. Evans (ed.). Byzantium: Faith and Power (1261–1557). Metropolitan Museum of Art. p. 59. ISBN 978-0-30010-278-9.
- Popovici, Rodica (2013). "Carreaux de poêle à aigles bicéphales dans la Moldavie médiévale (XVe-XVIIe siècles)". Cercetări Istorice. XXXII: 131–163. ISSN 1453-3960.
- Pungă, Gheorghe (2002). "Noi informații documentare privitoare la biserica Cuvioasa Paraschiva din Ștefănești – Botoșani". Monumentul. Lucrările Simpozionului Național Monumentul – Tradiție și Viitor. IV: 142–149. ISSN 1844-9042.
- Rosetti, Radu (1927). "Une supposition erronée sur la politique d'Étienne le Grand". Revue Historique du Sud-est Européen. IV (10–12): 320–325.
- Sacerdoțeanu, Aurelian (1969). "Descălecători de țară, dătători de legi și datini (II)". Magazin Istoric. III (I): 37–47. ISSN 0541-881X.
- Scarce, Jennifer M. (2003). Women's Costume of the Near and Middle East. Routledge. ISBN 0-7007-1560-6.
- Simon, Alexandru (2007). "Anti-Ottoman Warfare and Italian Propaganda: The Crusader Background of the Ottoman Raid on Oradea in 1474". Revista Crisia. 37: 113–139. ISSN 1016-2798.
- Stoleriu, Irina-Andreea (2010). "The Relationship between the Illumination Votive Portrait and Mural Portrait [sic] in Moldavian Art during 15th and 16th Centuries". European Journal of Science and Theology. 7 (1): 47–57. ISSN 1842-8517.
- Theodorescu, Răzvan (2004). "Această poartă a creștinătății". Revista Muzeelor (3): 5–12. ISSN 1220-1723.
- Tiron, Tudor-Radu (2009). "Despre 'soarele de amiază' din stema lui Ștefan cel Mare". Analele Putnei. 5 (1): 51–74. ISSN 1841-625X.
- Vasiliev, Alexander A. (1936). The Goths in the Crimea. The Mediaeval Academy of America. OCLC 248883400.
- Xenopol, A. D. (1927). Istoria românilor din Dacia Traiană. Vol. 4. Epoca lui Ștefan cel Mare: 1457—1546. Cartea Românească. OCLC 759746432.
