= John Apokaukos (died 1345) =

John Apokaukos (Greek: Ἱωάννης Ἀπόκαυκος; died 1345) was the eldest son of the Byzantine megas doux—and one of the chief instigators of the Byzantine civil war of 1341–47—Alexios Apokaukos, from his first marriage.

In 1343, after the citizens of the Empire's second city, Thessalonica, had risen up against Alexios Apokaukos' rival, John VI Kantakouzenos, John was named megas primikerios and appointed governor of the city, but actual power lay rather with the radical Zealot faction who had staged the anti-Kantakouzenist uprising. In June 1345, the elder Apokaukos was lynched by political prisoners in Constantinople. John immediately declared for Kantakouzenos and tried to seize control of the city, but the Zealots prevailed and restored their rule before Kantakouzenos' forces could react and aid Apokaukos and his supporters, who were captured and executed.

== Sources ==
- Nicol, Donald M. (1993). The Last Centuries of Byzantium, 1261–1453 (Second ed.). London: Rupert Hart-Davis Ltd. ISBN 0-246-10559-3.
- Trapp, Erich; Walther, Rainer; Beyer, Hans-Veit (1976). "1187. Ἀπόκαυκος Ἰωάννης". Prosopographisches Lexikon der Palaiologenzeit (in German). Vol. 1. Vienna: Verlag der Österreichischen Akademie der Wissenschaften. ISBN 3-7001-3003-1.
