= Demetrios Tzamplakon =

Byzantine aristocrat and military leader

Demetrios Tzamplakon (Greek: Δημήτριος Τζαμπλάκων, fl. 1345–1366/67) was a Byzantine aristocrat and senior military leader.

The Tzamplakones were an important and wealthy aristocratic family attested since the mid-13th century, when one of its members achieved the high military rank of Domestic of the Schools. Alexios Tzamplakon, Demetrios' father, was this man's son. His brothers, Asomatianos and Arsenios, also achieved high offices during the same period. Demetrios was married to Eudokia Palaiologina and had several children, whose names are unknown. One of his daughters married a certain Nikephoros Laskaris, attested at Christoupolis (modern Kavala) in 1366/67.

Demetrios is first attested in 1345, already holding the senior military rank of megas stratopedarches, during the siege of Serres by the forces of the Serbian ruler Stephen Dushan. A large part of the city's population, under Manuel Asen, wanted to surrender the city to the Serbs, while Tzamplakon led the loyalist faction. After the city's fall, he withdrew to Christoupolis, and is still attested in the 1360s. He donated his extensive lands in Macedonia to the Vatopedi Monastery of Mount Athos.

== Sources ==
- Guilland, Rodolphe (1967). Recherches sur les institutions byzantines [Studies on the Byzantine Institutions]. Berliner byzantinische Arbeiten 35 (in French). Vol. I. Berlin and Amsterdam: Akademie-Verlag & Adolf M. Hakkert. OCLC 878894516.
- Kazhdan, Alexander, ed. (1991). The Oxford Dictionary of Byzantium. Oxford and New York: Oxford University Press. ISBN 0-19-504652-8.
- Trapp, Erich; Beyer, Hans-Veit; Walther, Rainer; Sturm-Schnabl, Katja; Kislinger, Ewald; Leontiadis, Ioannis; Kaplaneres, Sokrates (1976–1996). Prosopographisches Lexikon der Palaiologenzeit (in German). Vienna: Verlag der Österreichischen Akademie der Wissenschaften. ISBN 3-7001-3003-1.
