= Xeros family =

The Xeroi, singular Xeros (Greek: Ξηρóς), were a Byzantine family belonging to the Peloponnesian aristocracy and active between the 10th and 13th centuries. They were mainly bureaucrats and judges. One of their distinguishing marks was the depiction of Saint Mark on their seals.

A judge named Xeros was a correspondent of the 11th-century scholar and official Michael Psellos. The name Basil was popular with them. Judges of this name are known in the themes of the Peloponnese, Hellas, the Cibyrrhaeots and Anatolikon. In 1057, the protomystikos John Xeros presided over the trial of two monasteries on Mount Athos. An eparch named Xeros took part in the rebellion of the Anemas against Alexios I Komnenos in 1105. Thereafter, the family declined in importance. Basil Xeros served as an ambassador to King Roger II of Sicily. Increasingly they were clerics. Leo Xeros (died 1153) was the metropolitan of Athens. Around 1252, John Xeros was the bishop of Naupaktos.
