= Theodore Hyrtakenos =

Theodore Hyrtakenos, Latinized as Theodorus Hyrtacenus (Greek: Θεόδωρος Ὑρτακηνός), was a court official of the Byzantine Empire. He flourished in the time of the Andronikos II Palaiologos (r. 1282–1328), where he was the superintendent of the public teachers of rhetoric and belles lettres.

Ninety-three of his letters, a congratulatory address, and three of his funeral orations are extant. Their stilted rhetoric hinders their address, but they speak towards an extensive acquaintance with ancient poetry. Also extant are a panegyric on the Virgin Mary, a panegyric on Aninas Thaumaturgus, and a description of the garden of Saint Anna in Nazareth.
