= Kalothetos =

Kalothetos (Greek: Καλόθετος) is a Greek surname. Notable people with the surname include:

- Leo Kalothetos, 14th-century Byzantine politician
- Theodotos Kalothetos, 13th-century Nicaean politician
