= Basilakes =

Byzantine noble family

Basilakes (Greek: Βασιλάκης), feminine form Basilakina (Βασιλακίνα), was the name of a Byzantine noble family. They were either of Armenian or Paphlagonian origin.

According to the medieval Armenian historian Matthew of Edessa, a member of the family named "Vasilak" was killed at the decisive Battle of Manzikert of 1071. A few years later, in 1078/79, Nikephoros Basilakes tried to overthrow Emperor Nikephoros III Botaneiates (r. 1078–1081) until he was defeated by Alexios Komnenos (later known as Emperor Alexios I Komnenos; r. 1081–1118). Another member, George Basilakes, served as protoproedros in 1094/5. He or his namesake later joined a plot against Emperor Alexios I. According to a work written by a female member of the family (completed in 1098–1113), the Basilakes intermarried with the Dabetenos and Pakourianos families. The Basilakes were also reportedly of high rank, with members holding titles such as kouropalates. The author of the work, a certain Kale-Maria Basilakina, was given the village of Radolibos by Alexios I.

The family's stature declined by the mid-12th century, and they subsequently entered the Byzantine civil service. One of these figures, Constantine Basilakes, served as envoy and treasurer "of foreign expenses" in addition to being a soldier. Constantine perished during the Byzantine–Norman wars. According to the modern Byzantinist Alexander Kazhdan, the other known members of the family held low ranks, usually as provincial officials. A certain John Basilakes was nephew of the poet and grammarian John Tzetzes. In the early 13th century, Michael Basilakes served as logariastes (a type of financial official) in the area of Miletus. Lastly, a certain Basilakes, who may have held the title of nomikos in Mistra c. 1296, worked as scribe and poet.

== Sources ==
- Kazhdan, Alexander (1991). "Basilakes". In Kazhdan, Alexander (ed.). The Oxford Dictionary of Byzantium. Oxford and New York: Oxford University Press. ISBN 0-19-504652-8.
