= Asomatianos Tzamplakon =

Byzantine aristocrat and admiral

- Military career
- Allegiance: Byzantine Empire
- Branch: Byzantine Navy
- Rank: Admiral
- Conflicts: Byzantine–Genoese War of 1348–1349.

Asomatianos Tzamplakon (Greek: Ἀσωματιανός Τζαμπλάκων, fl. 1348–1349) was a Byzantine aristocrat and admiral during the Byzantine–Genoese War of 1348–1349.

The Tzamplakones were an important and wealthy aristocratic family attested since the mid-13th century, when one of its members achieved the high military rank of Domestic of the Schools. Alexios Tzamplakon, Asomatianos' father, was this man's son. His brothers, Demetrios and Arsenios, also achieved high offices during the same period.

Asomatianos is first attested in 1348, as megas doux (commander-in-chief of the Byzantine navy). He was placed in charge of the Byzantine effort to construct a new fleet to use against the Genoese colony of Galata in the Byzantine–Genoese War of 1348–1349. His fleet's inexperience and incompetence led to its destruction or capture by the Genoese. Tzamplakon survived the debacle, and died sometime before 1356.

== Sources ==
- Guilland, Rodolphe (1967). Recherches sur les institutions byzantines [Studies on the Byzantine Institutions]. Berliner byzantinische Arbeiten 35 (in French). Vol. I. Berlin and Amsterdam: Akademie-Verlag & Adolf M. Hakkert. OCLC 878894516.
- Kazhdan, Alexander, ed. (1991). The Oxford Dictionary of Byzantium. Oxford and New York: Oxford University Press. ISBN 0-19-504652-8.
- Trapp, Erich; Beyer, Hans-Veit; Kaplaneres, Sokrates; Leontiadis, Ioannis (1991). "27753. Τζαμπλάκων Ἀσωματιανός". Prosopographisches Lexikon der Palaiologenzeit (in German). Vol. 11. Vienna: Verlag der Österreichischen Akademie der Wissenschaften. ISBN 3-7001-3003-1.
