= Michael Palaiologos (son of Andronikos III) =

Michael Palaiologos (Greek: Μιχαήλ Παλαιολόγος; born 1337) was the second son of Byzantine emperor Andronikos III Palaiologos (reigned 1328–1341).

Little is known of Michael's life. He was born in 1337, during his father's reign, and was hence styled a porphyrogennetos. Sometime before Andronikos III's death in 1341, Michael was raised to the supreme court rank of Despot. In 1351/52, when his elder brother, Emperor John V Palaiologos (r. 1341–1391), was engaged in a struggle for the throne with Matthew Kantakouzenos, John V, who sought aid from the Serbian Emperor Stephen Dushan (r. 1331–1355), sent him as a hostage to the Serbian court. Nothing further is heard of him.

== Sources ==
- Guilland, Rodolphe (1959). "Recherches sur l'histoire administrative de l'Empire byzantin: Le despote, δεσπότης". Revue des études byzantines (in French). 17: 52–89. doi:10.3406/rebyz.1959.1199.
- Trapp, Erich; Beyer, Hans-Veit; Kaplaneres, Sokrates; Leontiadis, Ioannis (1989). "21521. <Παλαιολόγος> Μιχαήλ". Prosopographisches Lexikon der Palaiologenzeit (in German). Vol. 9. Vienna: Verlag der Österreichischen Akademie der Wissenschaften.
