= Andronikos III Palaiologos =

Byzantine emperor from 1328 to 1341

- Emperor and Autocrat of the Romans
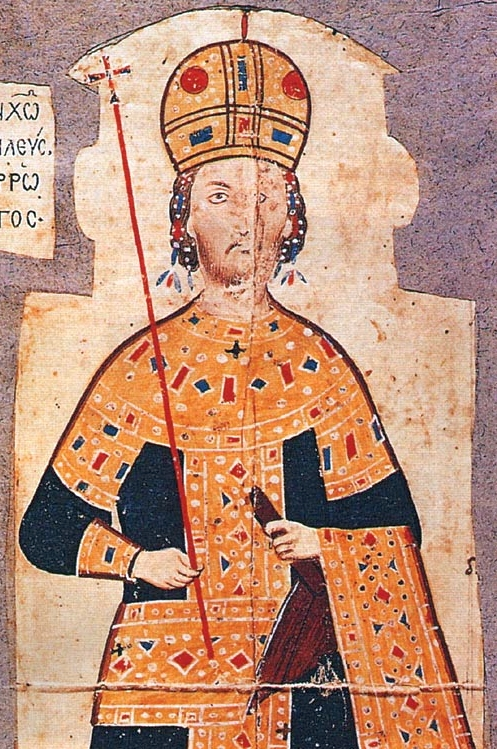
- 14th-century miniature. Stuttgart, Württembergische Landesbibliothek.

Byzantine emperor
- Reign: 24 May 1328 – 15 June 1341
- Coronation: 2 February 1325
- Predecessor: Andronikos II Palaiologos
- Successor: John V Palaiologos
- Proclamation: 1308/1313 as co-emperor
- Born: 25 March 1297; Constantinople, Byzantine Empire (now Istanbul, Turkey)
- Died: 15 June 1341 (aged 44); Constantinople, Byzantine Empire
- Spouse: Irene of Brunswick; Anna of Savoy
- Issue more...: Irene, Empress of Trebizond; Maria (renamed Irene); John V Palaiologos; Michael Palaiologos
Names
- Andronikos Doukas Angelos Komnenos Palaiologos; Medieval Greek: Ἀνδρόνικος Δούκας Ἄγγελος Κομνηνός Παλαιολόγος
- House: Palaiologos
- Father: Michael IX Palaiologos
- Mother: Rita of Armenia
- Religion: Eastern Orthodox
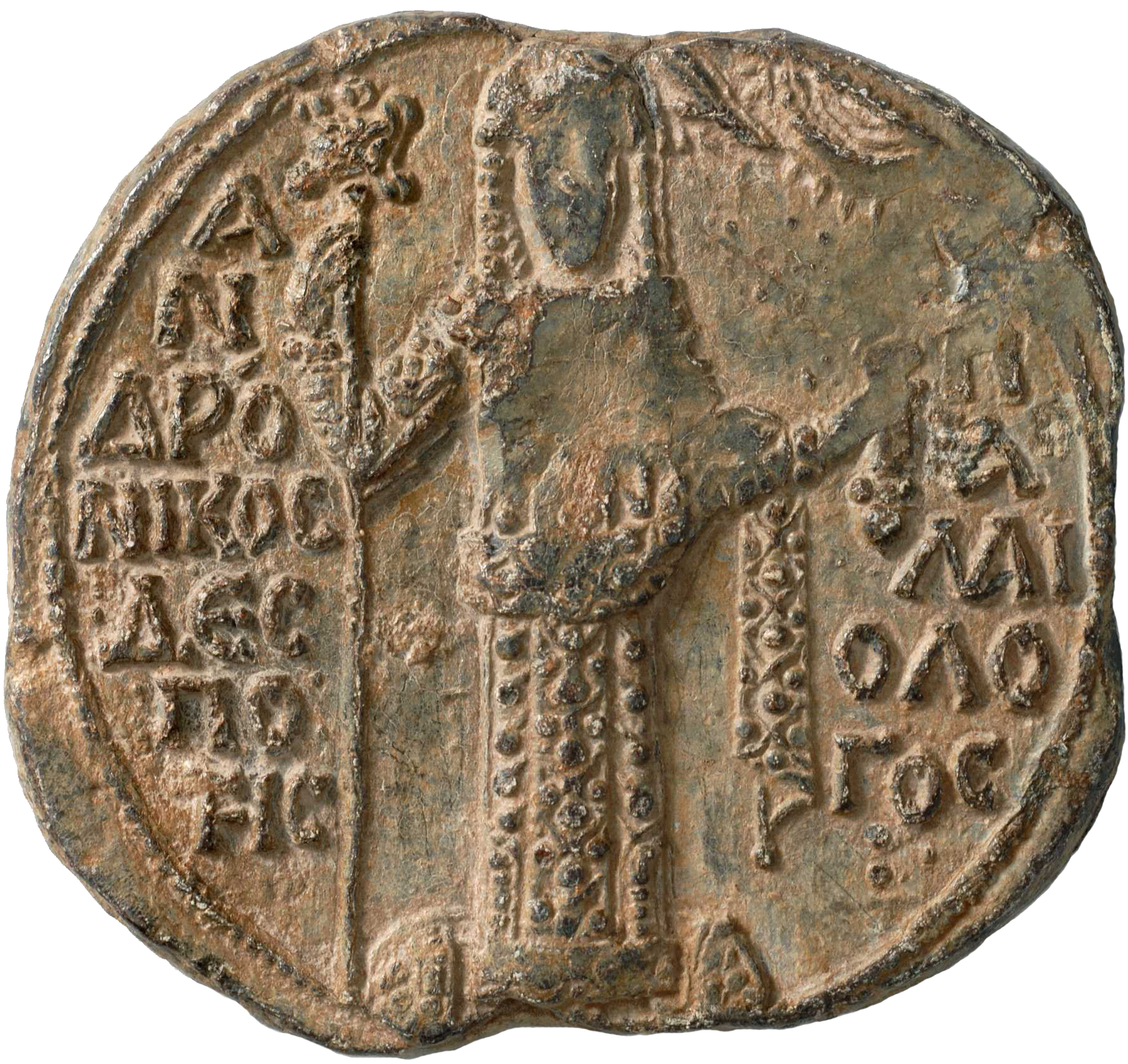
- Seal

Andronikos III Palaiologos (Greek: Ἀνδρόνικος Δούκας Ἄγγελος Κομνηνός Παλαιολόγος, romanized: Andrónikos Doúkās Ángelos Komnēnós Palaiológos; 25 March 1297 – 15 June 1341), commonly Latinized as Andronicus III Palaeologus, was the Byzantine emperor from 1328 to 1341. He was the son of Michael IX Palaiologos and Rita of Armenia. He was proclaimed co-emperor in his youth, before 1313, and in April 1321 he rebelled against his grandfather, Andronikos II Palaiologos. He was formally crowned co-emperor in February 1325, before ousting his grandfather outright and becoming sole emperor on 24 May 1328.

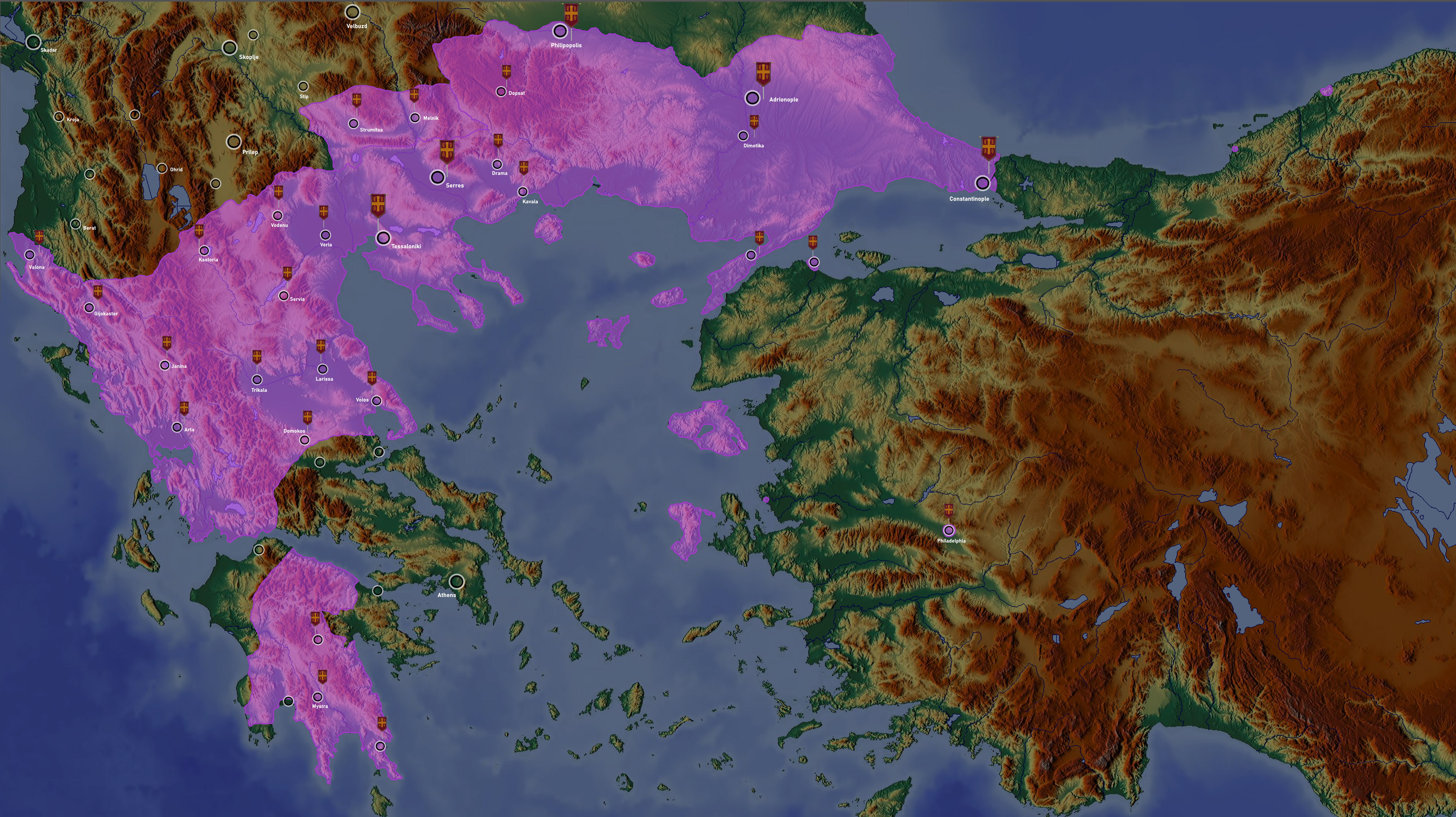
The Byzantine Empire in 1341, at the end of Andronikos reign.

His reign included the last failed attempts to hold back the Ottoman Turks in Bithynia and the defeat at Rusokastro against the Bulgarians, but also the successful recovery of Chios, Lesbos, Phocaea, Thessaly, and Epirus. His early death left a power vacuum that resulted in the disastrous civil war between his widow, Anna of Savoy, and his closest friend and supporter, John VI Kantakouzenos, leading to the establishment of the Serbian Empire and the entry of the Ottoman Empire into the Balkans.

== Life ==
Andronikos was born in Constantinople on 25 March 1297. His father, Michael IX Palaiologos, began reigning in full imperial style as co-emperor c. 1295.

In March 1318, Andronikos married Irene of Brunswick, daughter of Henry I, Duke of Brunswick-Grubenhagen and in c.1321 she gave birth to a son, who died in infancy.

In 1320, Andronikos accidentally caused the death of his brother Manuel, after which their father, co-emperor Michael IX Palaiologos, died in his grief. The homicide and the general dissolute behavior of Andronikos III and his coterie, mostly the young scions of the great aristocratic clans of the Empire, resulted in a deep rift in the relations between young Andronikos and his grandfather, still reigning as Emperor Andronikos II Palaiologos.

Emperor Andronikos II disowned his grandson Andronikos, who fled the capital, rallied his supporters in Thrace, and began to reign as rival emperor in 1321. A few months after the rebellion began, Andronikos II relented and named Andronikos III his co-emperor. The concession was not enough to prevent intermittent civil war between the two monarchs in the years 1321 to 1328.

Empress Irene died on 16/17 August 1324 with no surviving child. Theodora Palaiologina, sister of Andronikos III, married the new tsar Michael Shishman of Bulgaria in 1324. Andronikos III, then a widower, married Anna of Savoy in October 1326. In 1327 she gave birth to Maria (renamed Irene) Palaiologina.

Andronikos III concluded the Treaty of Chernomen of 1327, an alliance with tsar Michael Shishman of Bulgaria against Stephen Uroš III Dečanski of Serbia. In 1328 the Byzantine civil war ended with the deposition of Emperor Andronikos II, who retired to a monastery.

== Reign ==
=== Military history ===
Ottoman Turks besieged Nicaea in Asia Minor, historically the provisional capital of the Byzantine Empire from the Fourth Crusade until the Byzantine recapture of Constantinople. Andronikos III launched a relief attempt, which Ottoman sultan Orhan defeated at the Battle of Pelekanon on 10 or 15 June 1329.

Also in 1329, Andronikos III sent a naval expedition against Martino Zaccaria, Genoese ruler of the Lordship of Chios (which also included Samos and Cos). The expedition deposed Zaccaria, and regained Byzantine control of the islands.

An alliance with Bulgaria failed to secure any gains for the Byzantine empire. On 28 July 1330, the Serbians decisively defeated the Bulgarians in the Battle of Velbazhd (modern Kyustendil, Bulgaria) without significant Byzantine participation. The Ottomans continued to advance in 1331, finally taking Nicaea (İznik). Andronikos III wanted Nicomedia and the other few Byzantine forts in Anatolia not to suffer the same fate and sought to pay off the Ottomans with tribute.

Andronikos III reorganized and attempted to strengthen the weakened Byzantine navy, which comprised only 10 ships by 1332; in emergencies, he still could muster a hundred extra merchant ships.

Having failed to gain anything against Serbia, Andronikos III attempted to annex Bulgarian Thrace, but the new tsar Ivan Alexander of Bulgaria defeated Byzantine forces at the Battle of Rusokastro on 18 July 1332. Andronikos III secured peace with Bulgaria by territorial concessions and the marriage of his daughter Maria (renamed Irene) to Ivan Alexander's son, the future Michael Asen IV of Bulgaria.

The Muslim traveler Ibn Battuta visited Constantinople towards the end of 1332 and mentions meeting Andronikos III in his memoirs. Byzantine sources do not attest to the meeting.

Stephen Gabrielopoulos, ruler over Thessaly, died circa 1333; taking advantage of the secession crisis, Andronikos III extended Byzantine control over the region.

Syrgiannes Palaiologos, entrusted with the governorship of Thessalonica, deserted to the side of king Stephen Uroš IV Dušan of Serbia and aided their advance in Macedonia. Serbs soon found themselves in possession of Ohrid, Prilep and Srumitsa. Syrgiannes then directed capture of Kastoria, after this Serbs marched down towards Thessaloniki, soon reaching the city's walls. Byzantines responded with a well-conceived plot. Byzantine general Sphrantzes Palaiologos, posing as a deserter, entered the Serbian camp and killed Syrgiannes Palaiologos. Dušan's plans were seriously upset, for his successes until then had been chiefly owing to Syrgiannes' strategic abilities, knowledge of Byzantine position and his allies who had surrendered fortresses to Serbs. Furthering Dušan's willingness to negotiate was intelligence that Byzantines just repelled a major Turkish raiding party, enabling more Byzantine troops to aid Thessaloniki front and the report that Hungarians were mobilizing to attack Serbia in the north. Serbs agreed to peace on 26 August 1334. Byzantines recognized Serbian gains in Ohrid, Prilep, Strumitsa, Siderokastron, Chermen and Prosek.

Andronikos III meanwhile effected the recovery of Phocaea in 1334 from the last Genoese governor, Domenico Cattaneo. However, this victory failed to stem significantly the Ottoman advance in Asia Minor. Byzantine rule gradually vanished from Anatolia as tribute failed to appease Ottoman sultan Orhan, who took Nicomedia in 1337, leaving only Philadelphia and a handful of ports under Byzantine control.

Despite these troubles, Andronikos III took advantage of a secession crisis in the Despotate of Epirus in 1337, regaining Byzantine control from Nikephoros II Orsini. Thessaly was also reconquered by Andronikos III during this period.

In 1340, Dušan fell seriously ill. At this critical time, one of Dušan's leading commanders, Hrelja deserted to Byzantines. He could do this because he had possessed holdings right on Byzantine-Serbian border that included region of the middle of Struma river, with Strumitsa and other two other strongly fortified castles near-by.

In 1341, the Latin lords of the Peloponnese sent a delegation to Constantinople, seeking to swear allegiance to the Byzantine crown. An ailing Andronikos III then received the Latin delegation on one occasion, shortly before succumbing to an illness on 15 June 1341.

=== Domestic policy ===
John Kantakouzenos, megas domestikos of Andronikos III and later emperor, wielded effective administrative authority during the reign, while the Emperor personally enjoyed hunting and waging war.

Andronikos III also reformed the judiciary through his creation of a panel of four judges, designated "Universal Justices of the Romans".

The reign of Andronikos III took place in a conflicted time inside his kingdom, with 'civil strife' occurring within the Byzantine Empire during his reign.

== Family ==
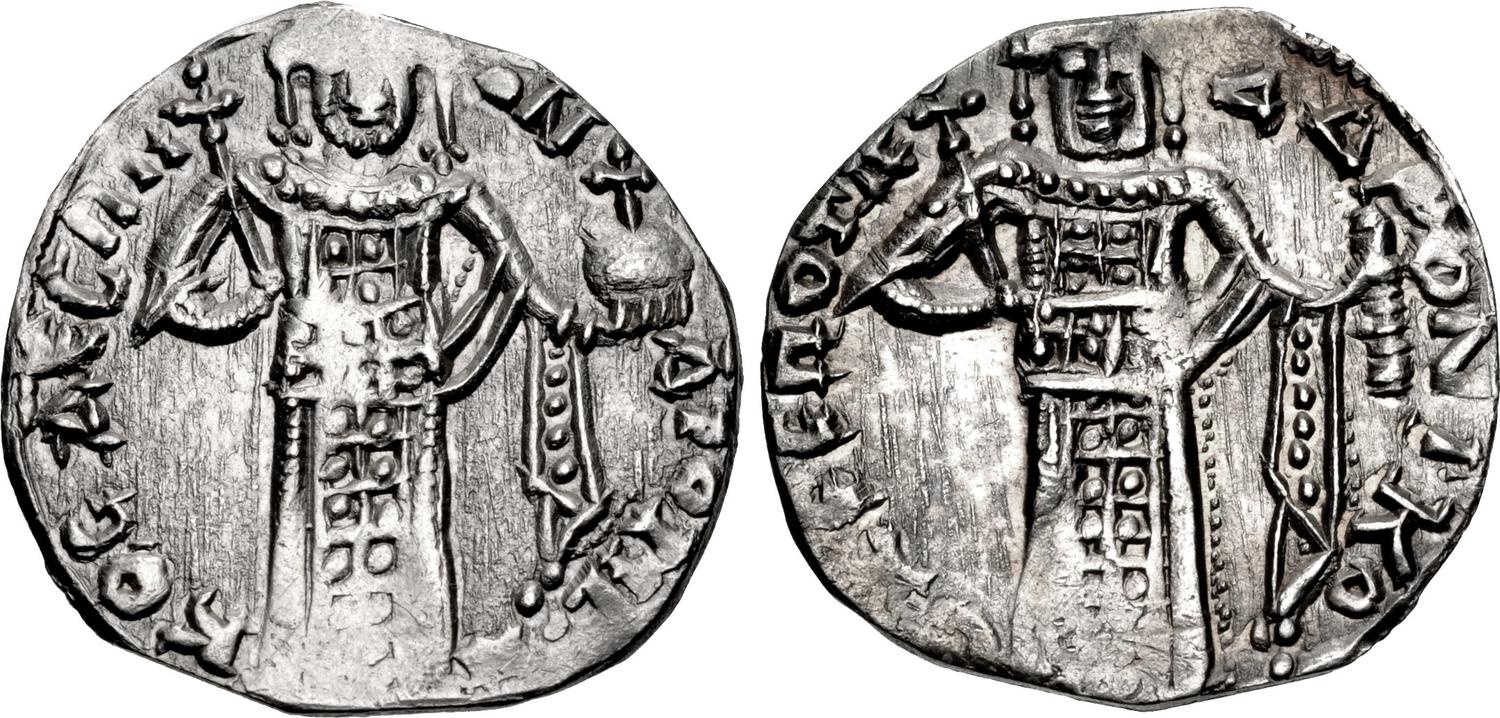
Silver basilikon of Andronikos II and Andronikos III

Andronikos III was first married in 1318 with Irene of Brunswick, daughter of Henry I, Duke of Brunswick-Lüneburg; she died in 1324. They had an unnamed son, who died shortly after birth in 1321.

In 1326, Andronikos III married as his second wife Anna of Savoy, daughter of Amadeus V, Count of Savoy and of his second wife Marie of Brabant, Countess of Savoy. Their marriage produced several children, including:

- Maria (renamed Eirene) Palaiologina, who married Michael Asen IV of Bulgaria
- John V Palaiologos (born 18 June 1332)
- Michael Palaiologos, despotes.
- Irene (renamed Maria) Palaiologina, who married Francesco I Gattilusio.

According to the contemporary Byzantine historian Nicephorus Gregoras (c. 1295–1360), Andronikos also had an illegitimate daughter, Irene Palaiologina of Trebizond, who married emperor Basil of Trebizond and took over the throne of the Empire of Trebizond from 1340 to 1341. The contemporary traveller Ibn Battuta (1304–1368/69) also records in his Rihla the existence of another daughter, who had been married to Öz Beg Khan of the Golden Horde, and taken the name Bayalun. Ibn Battuta claims to have accompanied her to Constantinople from her husband's court in late 1332 or 1334.

== Succession and legacy ==
Andronikos III died at Constantinople, aged 44, on 15 June 1341, possibly due to chronic malaria, and was buried in the Hodegon Monastery after lying in state at the Hagia Sophia. Historians contend that his reign ended with the Byzantine Empire in a still-tenable situation and generally do not implicate deficiencies in his leadership in its later demise. John V Palaiologos succeeded his father as Byzantine emperor, but at only nine years of age, he required a regent.

The energetic campaigns of emperor Andronikos III simply lacked sufficient strength to defeat the imperial enemies and led to several significant Byzantine reverses at the hands of Bulgarians, Serbians, and Ottomans. Andronikos III nevertheless provided active leadership and cooperated with able administrators. Under him, the empire came closest to regaining a position of power in the Balkans and the Greek peninsula after the Fourth Crusade. The loss of a few imperial territories in Anatolia, however, left the Ottoman Turks poised to expand into Europe.

Within a few months after the death of Andronikos III, controversy over the right to exercise the regency over the new emperor John V Palaiologos and the position of John Kantakouzenos as all-powerful chief minister and friend of Andronikos led to the outbreak of the destructive Byzantine civil war of 1341–47, which consumed the resources of the empire and left it in an untenable position. The weakened Byzantine Empire failed to prevent the formation of the Serbian Empire and, more ominously, the Ottoman invasion of Europe.

== See also ==
- List of Byzantine emperors

== Notes ==
Andronikos III Palaiologos Palaiologos dynasty Born: 25 March 1297 Died: 15 June 1341
Regnal titles
Preceded by Andronikos II	Byzantine emperor 1321–1341 with Andronikos II (1325–1328)	Succeeded by John V
