= Trabzon =

City in Turkey

- City
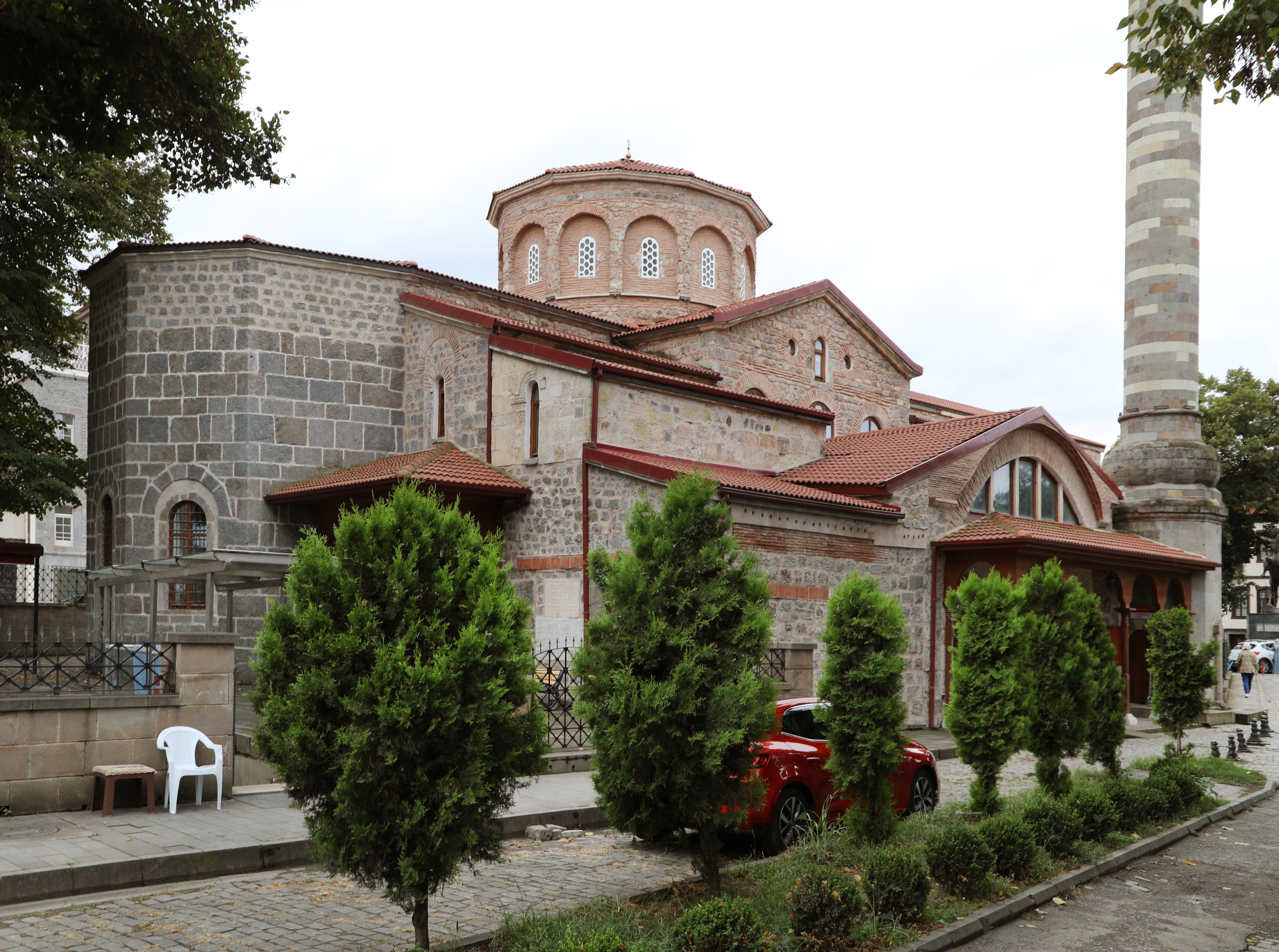
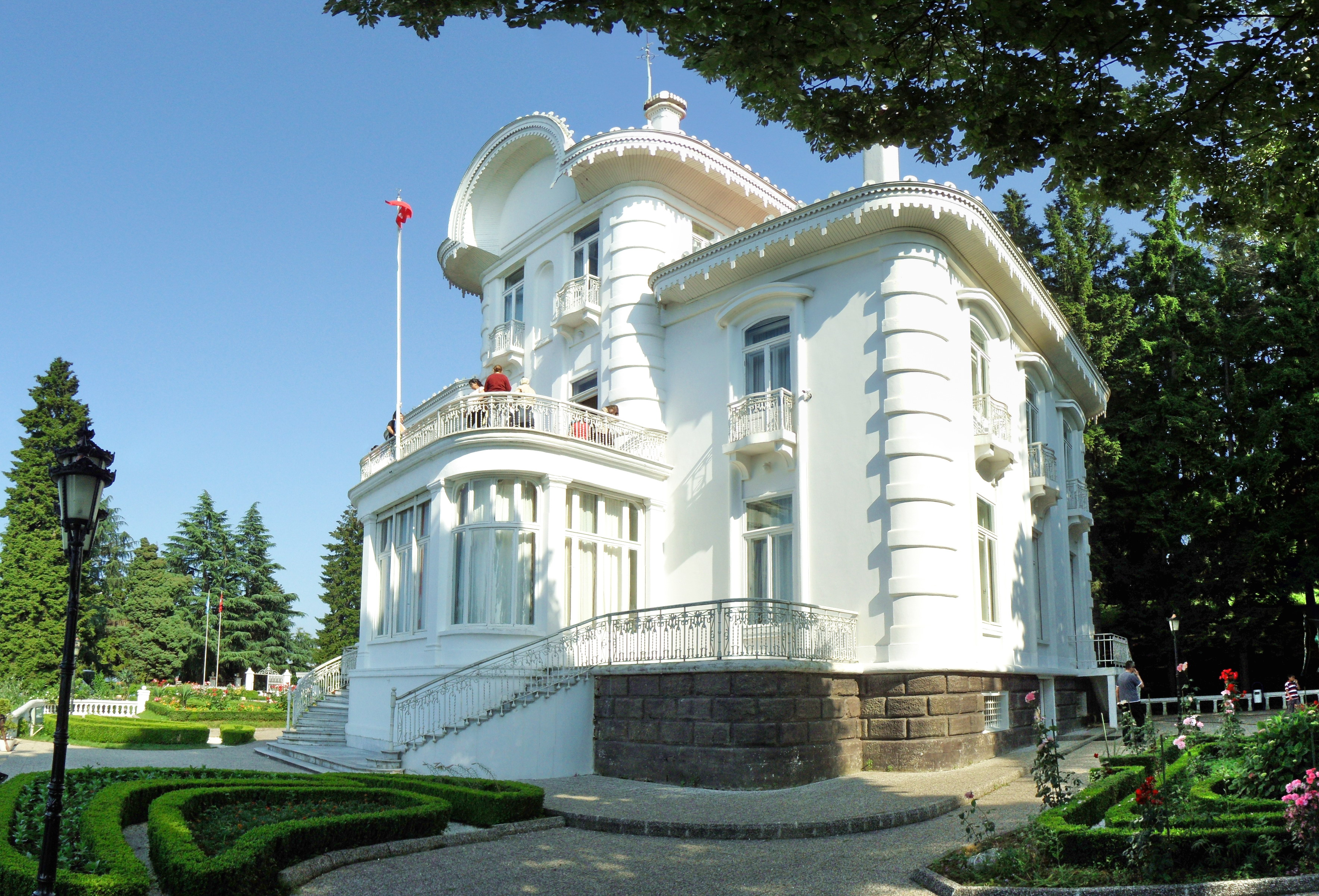
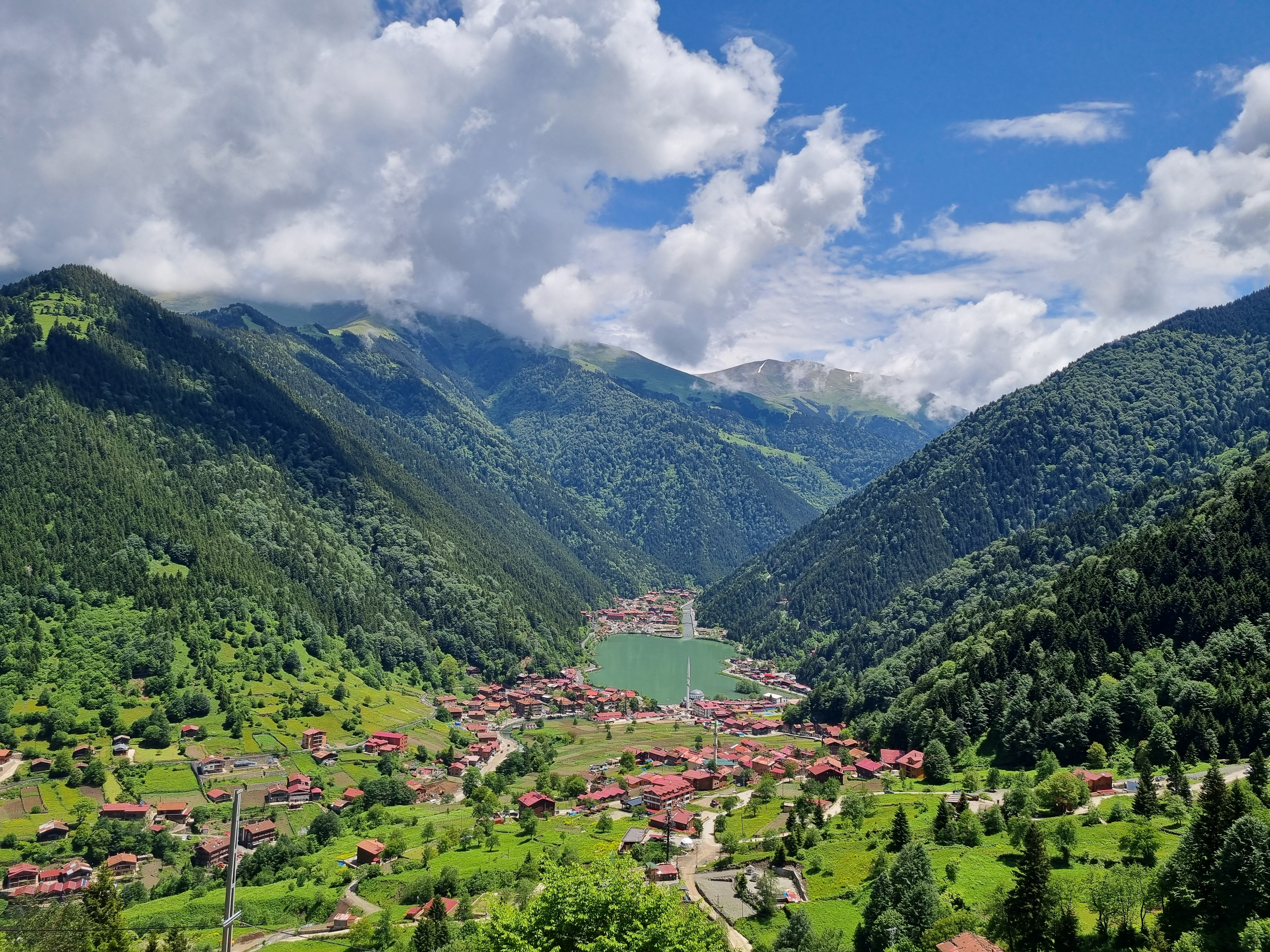
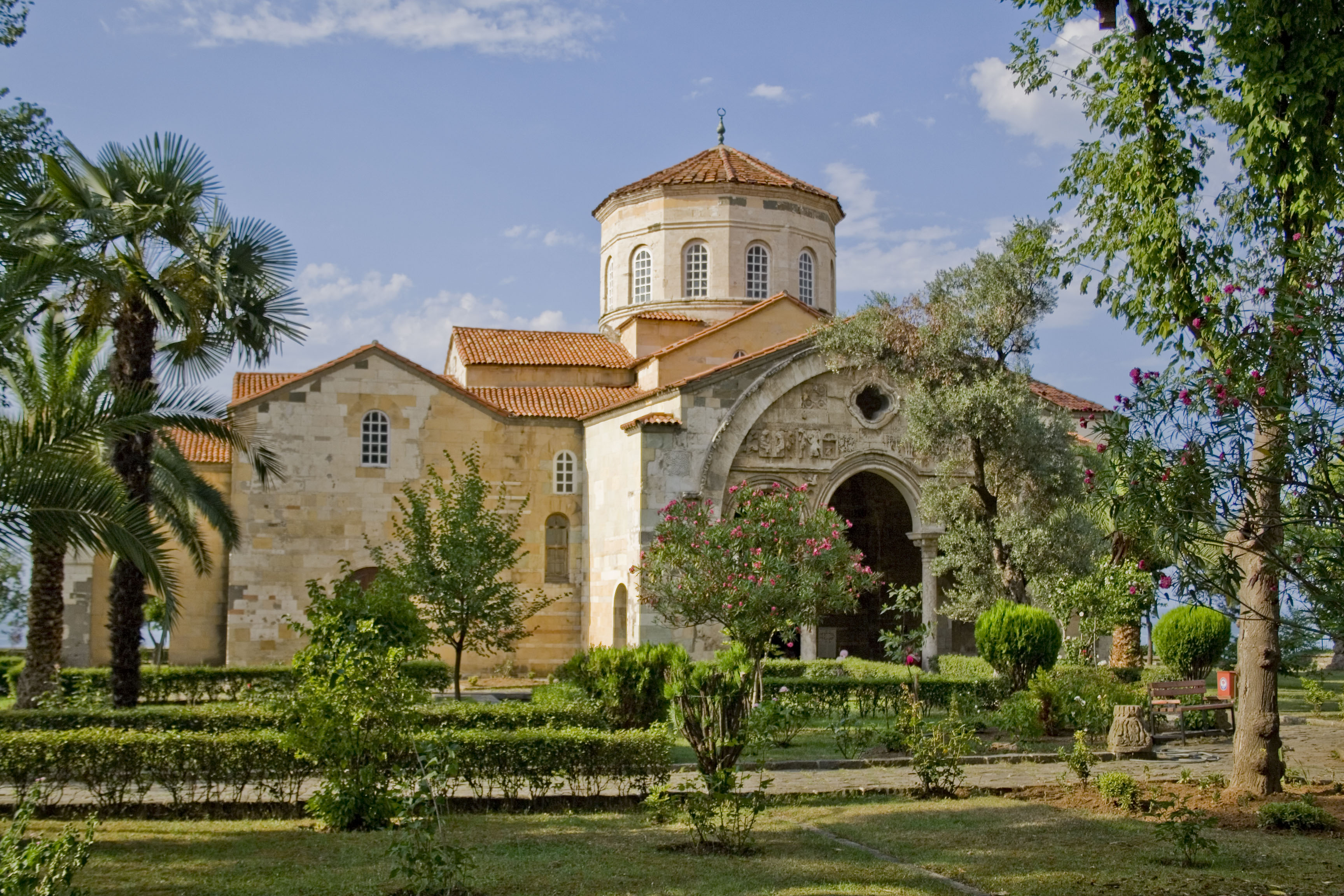
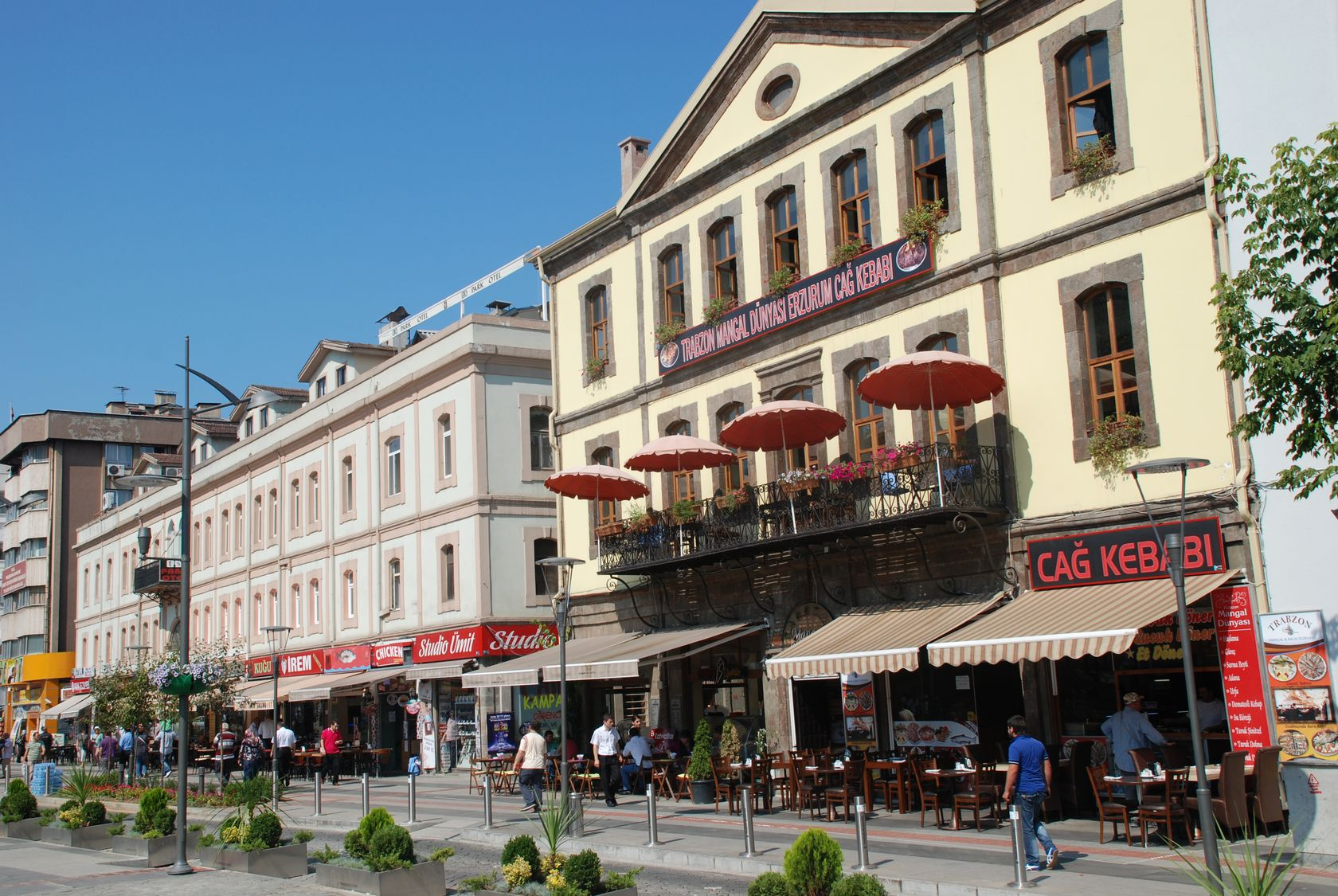
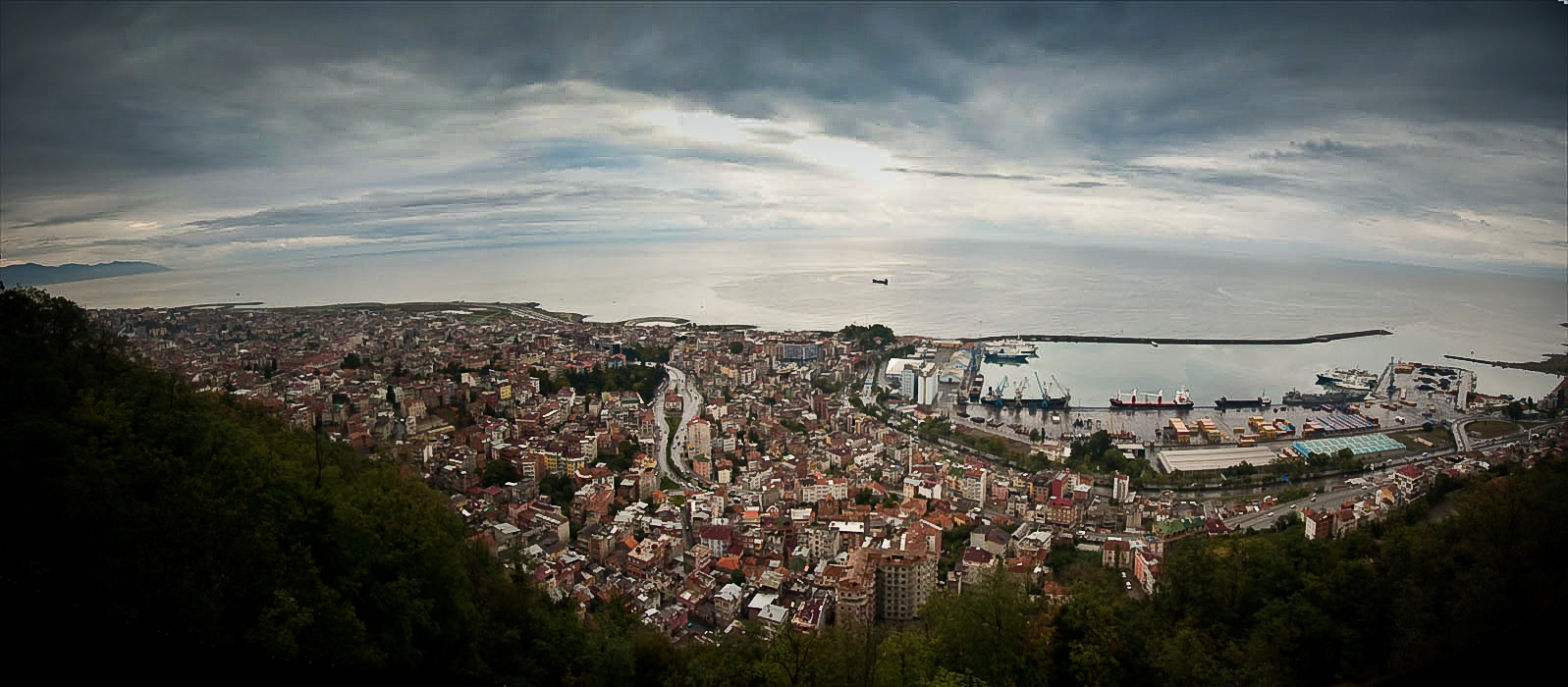
- Clockwise from top: Fatih Mosque; Lake Uzungöl; Atatürk Square; a general view of the city centre from Boztepe; Hagia Sophia of Trabzon; and Atatürk's House

- Emblem of Trabzon Metropolitan Municipality
- Nickname: City of Tale in the East
- Location in Turkey Trabzon (Black Sea) Trabzon (Asia)
- Coordinates: 41°0′18″N 39°43′21″E
- Country: Turkey
- Region: Black Sea Region
- Province: Trabzon
- Established: c. 756 BC

Government
  - Governor: Aziz Yıldırım
  - Mayor: Ahmet Metin Genç (AK Parti)
- Elevation: 33 m (108 ft)
- Highest elevation: 1,863 m (6,112 ft)
- Lowest elevation: 0 m (0 ft)

Population (2025)
  - Urban: 335,116
- Demonym(s): Trapezian, Trapezuntine, Trebizonian, Trabzonlu, Trabzonite
- Time zone: UTC+3 (TRT)
- Postal code: 61xxx
- Area code: (+90) 462
- Licence plate: 61
- Climate: Cfa
- Website: www.trabzon.bel.tr www.trabzon.gov.tr

Trabzon (Turkish pronunciation: [tɾɑbzon]) is a city on the Black Sea coast of northeastern Turkey and the capital of Trabzon Province. Historically known as Trebizond, the city was founded in 756 BC as Trapezous (Greek: Τραπεζοῦς) by Greeks originating from Miletus. It was added into the Achaemenid Empire by Cyrus the Great and was later part of the independent Kingdom of Pontus that challenged Rome until 68 BC. Thenceforth part of the Roman and later Byzantine Empire, the city was the capital of the Empire of Trebizond, one of the successor states of the Byzantine Empire after the Fourth Crusade in 1204. In 1461, it came under Ottoman rule.

During the early modern period, Trabzon, because of the importance of its port, again became a focal point of trade to Persia and the Caucasus. Today, Trabzon is the second largest city and port on the Black Sea coast of Turkey with a population of almost 300,000. The urban population of the city is 330,836 (Ortahisar), with a metropolitan population of 822,270 (whole province). Trabzon province has 18 districts in total.

== Name ==
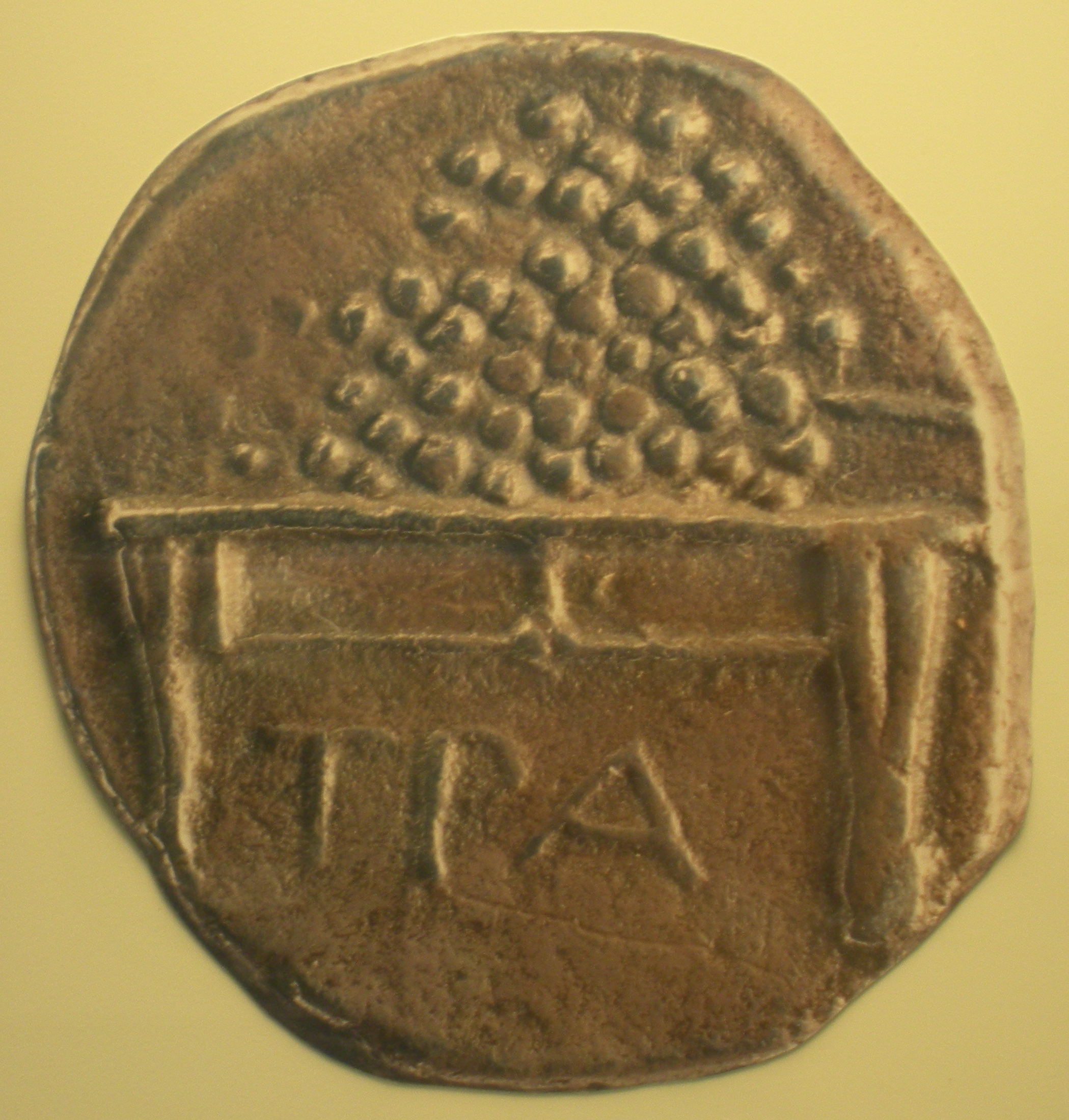
Coin of Trapezous from the 4th century BC in the British Museum. The coin promotes the colonial Greek city as a 'table of plenty'.

The Turkish name of the city is Trabzon. The first recorded name of the city is the Greek Tραπεζοῦς (Trapezous), referencing the table-like central hill between the Zağnos (İskeleboz) and Kuzgun streams on which it was founded (τράπεζα meant "table" in Ancient Greek; note the table on the coin in the figure). In Latin, Trabzon is called Trapezus, which is a Latinization of its ancient Greek name. Both in Pontic Greek and Modern Greek, it is called Τραπεζούντα (Trapezounta). In Ottoman Turkish and Persian, it is written as طربزون. During Ottoman times, Tarabozan was also used. In Laz, it is known as ტამტრა (T'amt'ra) or T'rap'uzani, in Georgian it is ტრაპიზონი (T'rap'izoni) and in Armenian it is Տրապիզոն (Trapizon). The 19th-century Armenian travelling priest Byjiskian called the city by other, native names, including Hurşidabat and Ozinis. Western geographers and writers used many spelling variations of the name throughout the Middle Ages. These versions of the name, which have incidentally been used in English literature as well, include: Trebizonde (Fr.), Trapezunt (German), Trebisonda (Sp.), Trapesunta (It.), Trapisonda, Tribisonde, Terabesoun, Trabesun, Trabuzan, Trabizond and Tarabossan.

In Spanish, the name was known from chivalric romances and Don Quixote. Because of its similarity to trápala and trapaza, trapisonda acquired the meaning "hullabaloo, imbroglio".

== History ==
=== Iron Age and Classical Antiquity ===
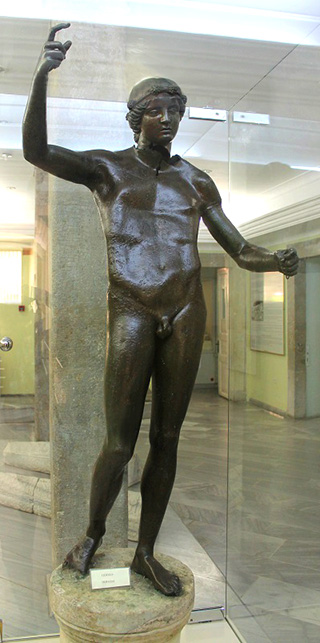
Roman Bronze statue of Hermes, dating to the 2nd century AD, found near Tabakhane bridge in the center of Trabzon. Displayed in Trabzon Museum.

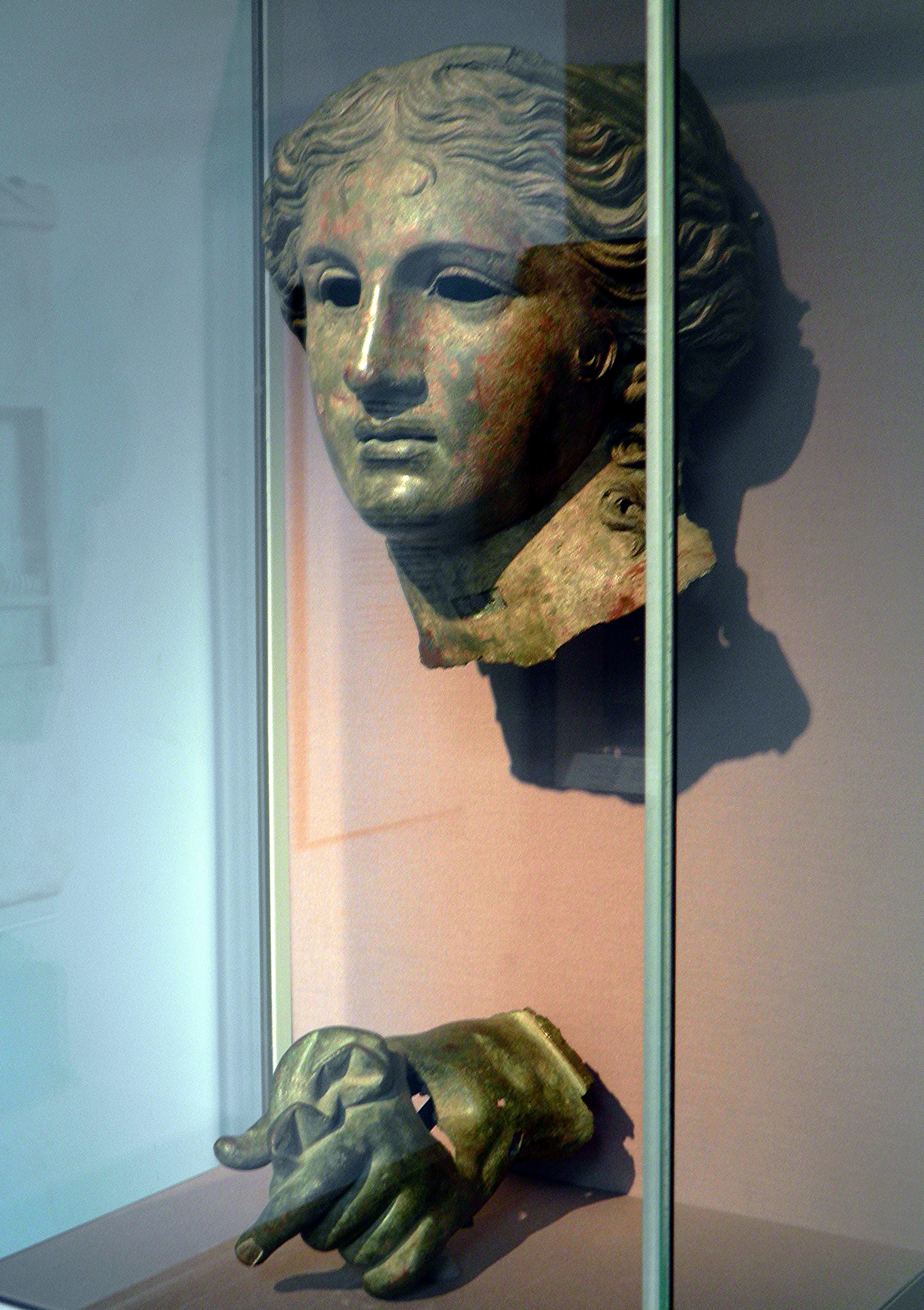
Head and hand of a 2nd c. BC bronze statue of (possibly Anahit as) Aphrodite, found near Kelkit to the south of Trabzon province. On display in the British Museum.

Before the city was founded as a Greek colony, the area was dominated by Colchians (west Georgian) and Chaldian (Anatolian) tribes. The Hayasa, who had been in conflict with the Central-Anatolian Hittites in the 14th century BC, are believed to have lived in the area south of Trabzon. Later, Greek authors mentioned the Macrones and the Chalybes as native peoples. One of the dominant Caucasian groups to the east were the Laz, who were part of the monarchy of the Colchis, together with other related Georgian peoples.

The city was founded in classical antiquity in 756 BC as Tραπεζούς (Trapezous), by Milesian traders from Sinope. It was one of a number (about ten) of Milesian emporia or trading colonies along the shores of the Black Sea. Others included Abydos and Cyzicus in the Dardanelles, and nearby Kerasous. Like most Greek colonies, the city was a small enclave of Greek life, and not an empire unto its own, in the later European sense of the word. As a colony, Trapezous initially paid tribute to Sinope, but early banking (money-changing) activity is suggested to have occurred in the city already in the 4th century BC, according to a silver drachma coin from Trapezus in the British Museum, London. Cyrus the Great added the city to the Achaemenid Empire, and was possibly the first ruler to consolidate the eastern Black Sea region into a single political entity (a satrapy).

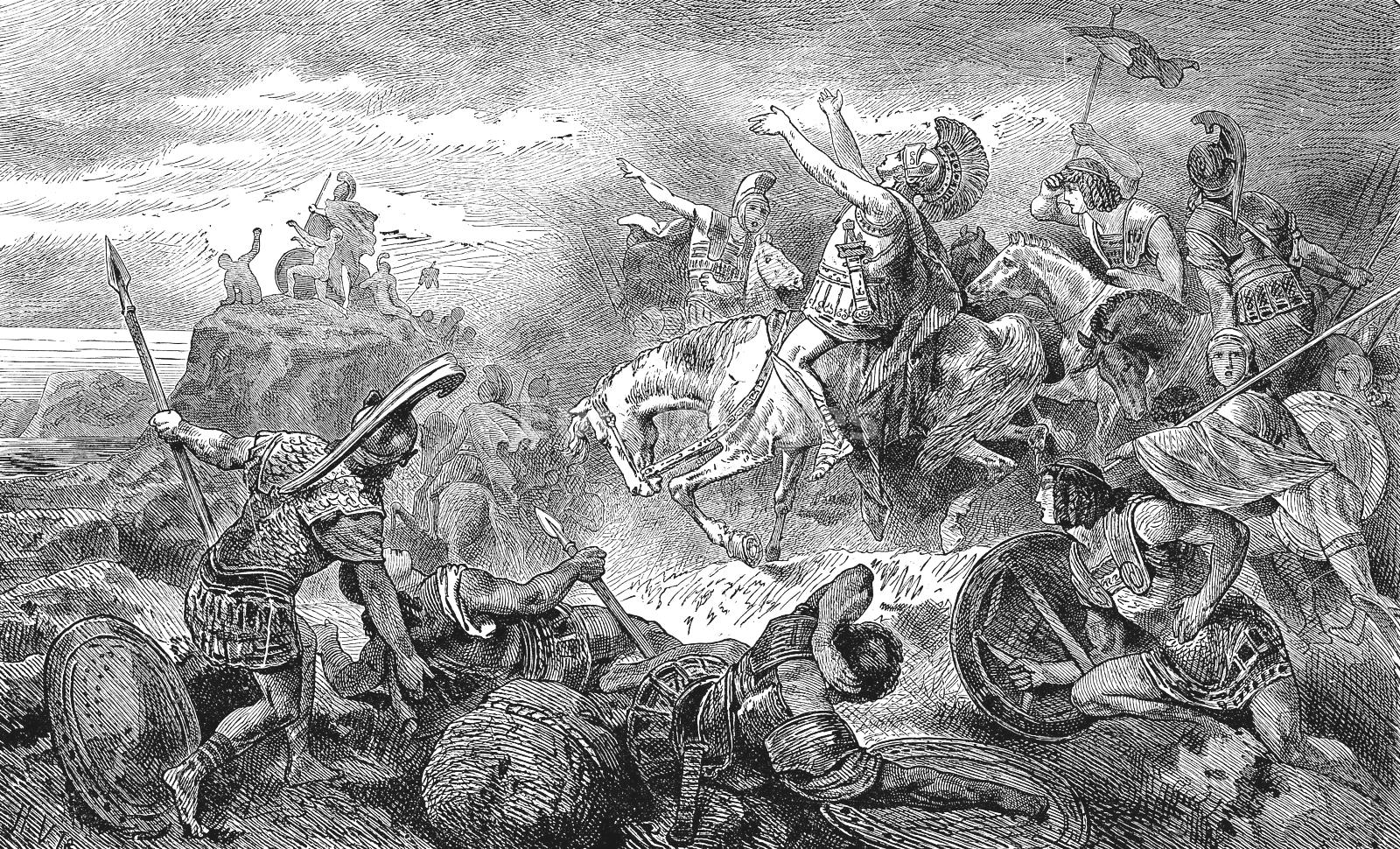
Thálatta! Thálatta! ("The Sea! The Sea!"). Trebizond was the first Greek city the Ten Thousand reached on their retreat from Persia. 19th c. illustration by Herman Vogel.

Trebizond's trade partners included the Mossynoeci. When Xenophon and the Ten Thousand mercenaries were fighting their way out of Persia, the first Greek city they reached was Trebizond (Xenophon, Anabasis, 5.5.10). The city and the local Mossynoeci had become estranged from the Mossynoecian capital, to the point of civil war. Xenophon's force resolved this in the rebels' favor, and so in Trebizond's interest.

Up until the conquests of Alexander the Great the city remained under the dominion of the Achaemenids. While the Pontus was not directly affected by the war, its cities gained independence as a result of it. Local ruling families continued to claim partial Persian heritage, and Persian culture had some lasting influence on the city; the holy springs of Mt. Minthrion to the east of the old town were devoted to the Persian-Anatolian Greek god Mithra. In the 2nd century BC, the city with its natural harbours was added to the Kingdom of Pontus by Pharnaces I. Mithridates VI Eupator made it the home port of the Pontic fleet, in his quest to remove the Romans from Anatolia.

After the defeat of Mithridates in 66 BC, the city was first handed to the Galatians, but it was soon returned to the grandson of Mithradates, and subsequently became part of the new client Kingdom of Pontus. When the kingdom was finally annexed to the Roman province of Galatia two centuries later, the fleet passed to new commanders, becoming the Classis Pontica. The city received the status of civitas libera, extending its judicial autonomy and the right to mint its own coin. Trebizond gained importance for its access to roads leading over the Zigana Pass to the Armenian frontier or the upper Euphrates valley. New roads were constructed from Persia and Mesopotamia under the rule of Vespasian. In the next century, the emperor Hadrian commissioned improvements to give the city a more structured harbor. The emperor visited the city in the year 129 as part of his inspection of the eastern border (limes). A mithraeum now serves as a crypt for the church and monastery of Panagia Theoskepastos (Kızlar Manastırı) in nearby Kizlara, east of the citadel and south of the modern harbor.

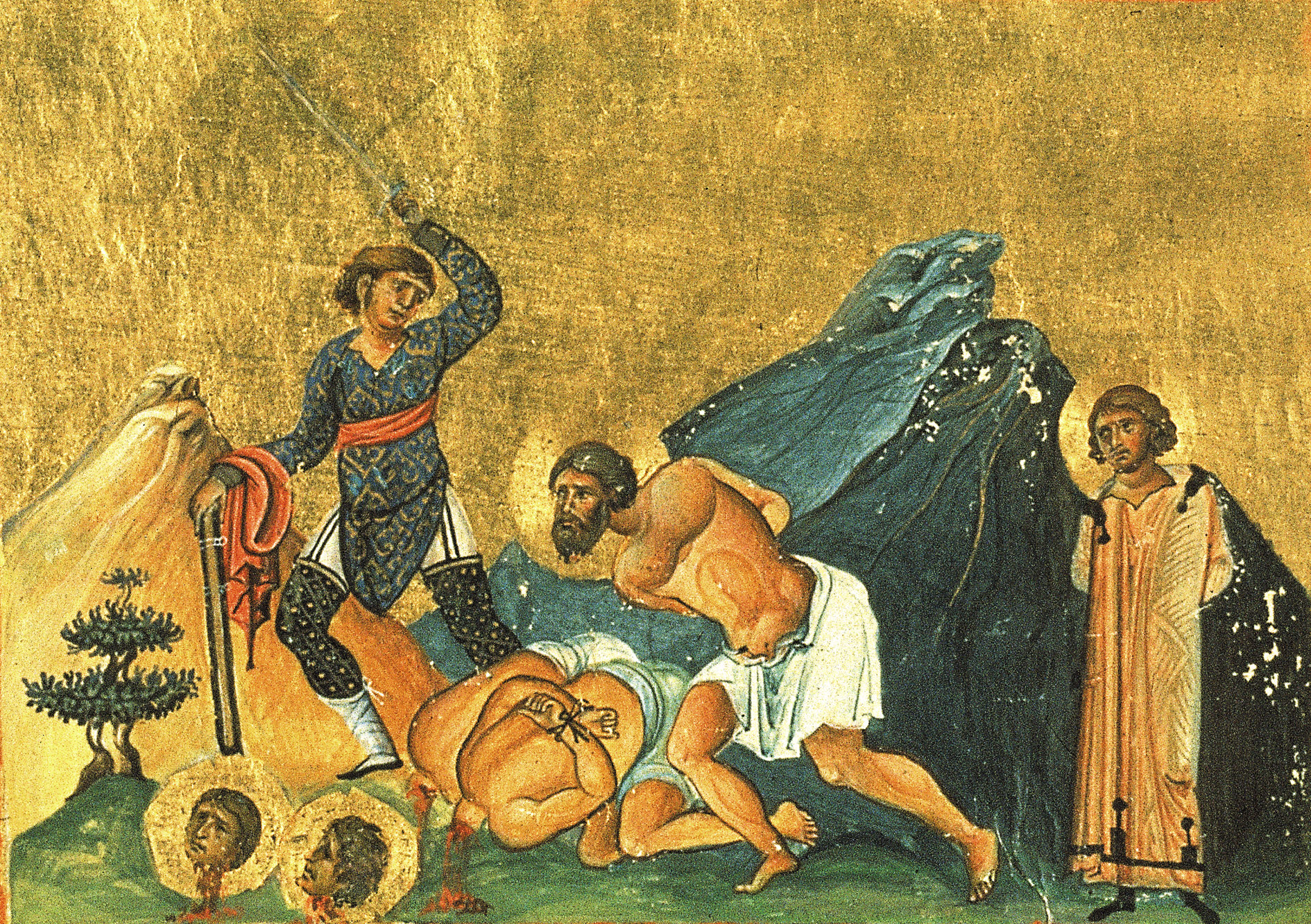
Martyrdom of Eugenius, Candidius, Valerian, and Aquila. Work dated to 985, Menologion of Basil II, Vatican Library.

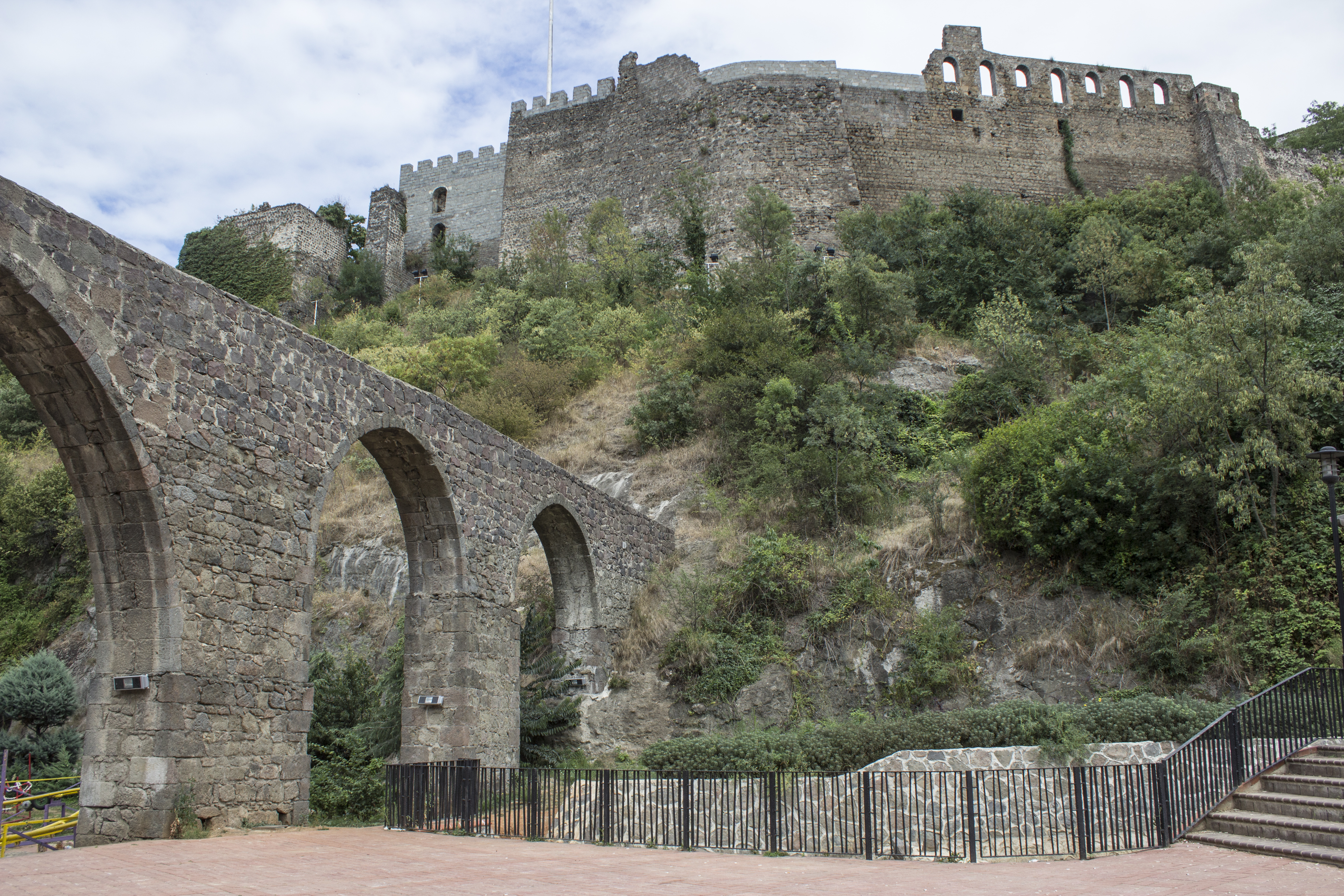
Parts of the city walls of Trabzon and the Eugenius Aqueduct are among the oldest remaining structures in the city.

Septimius Severus punished Trebizond for having supported his rival Pescennius Niger during the Year of the Five Emperors. In 257, the city was pillaged by the Goths, despite reportedly being defended by "10,000 above its usual garrison" and two bands of walls. Trebizond was subsequently rebuilt, pillaged again, by the Persians, in 258, and then rebuilt once more. It did not soon recover. Only in the reign of Diocletian does an inscription allude to the restoration of the city; Ammianus Marcellinus had nothing to say of Trebizond except that it was "not an obscure town."

Christianity had reached Trebizond by the third century, for during the reign of Diocletian occurred the martyrdom of Eugenius and his associates Candidius, Valerian, and Aquila. Eugenius had destroyed the statue of Mithras which overlooked the city from Mount Minthrion (Boztepe), and became the patron saint of the city after his death. Early Christians sought refuge in the Pontic Mountains south of the city, where they established Vazelon Monastery in 270 AD and Sumela Monastery in 386 AD. As early as the First Council of Nicea, Trebizond had its own bishop. Subsequently, the Bishop of Trebizond was subordinated to the Metropolitan Bishop of Poti. Then during the 9th century, Trebizond itself became the seat of the Metropolitan Bishop of Lazica.

=== Byzantine period ===
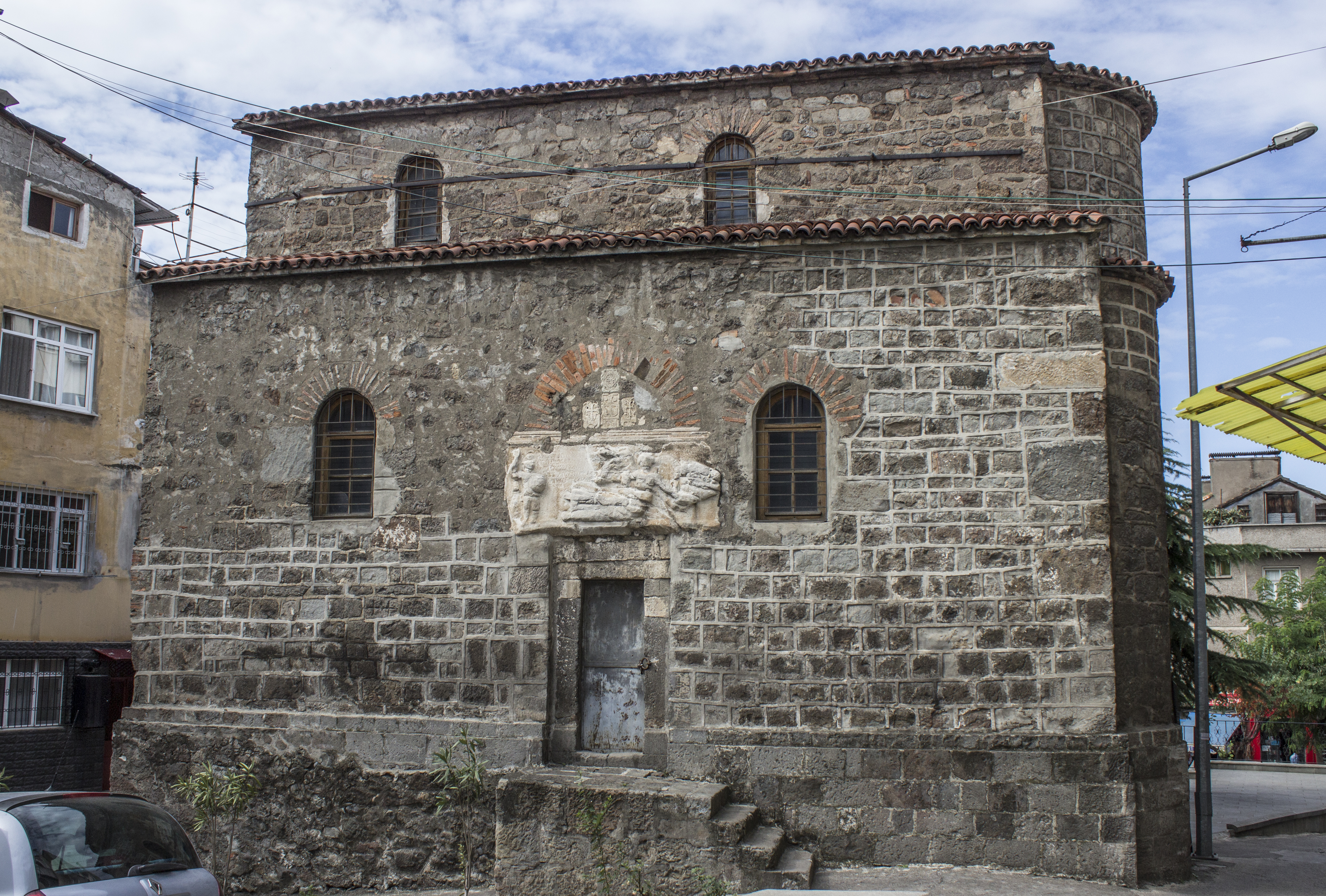
Saint Anne Church, to the east of the walled city, is the oldest church in the city, possibly dating back to the 6th or 7th century.

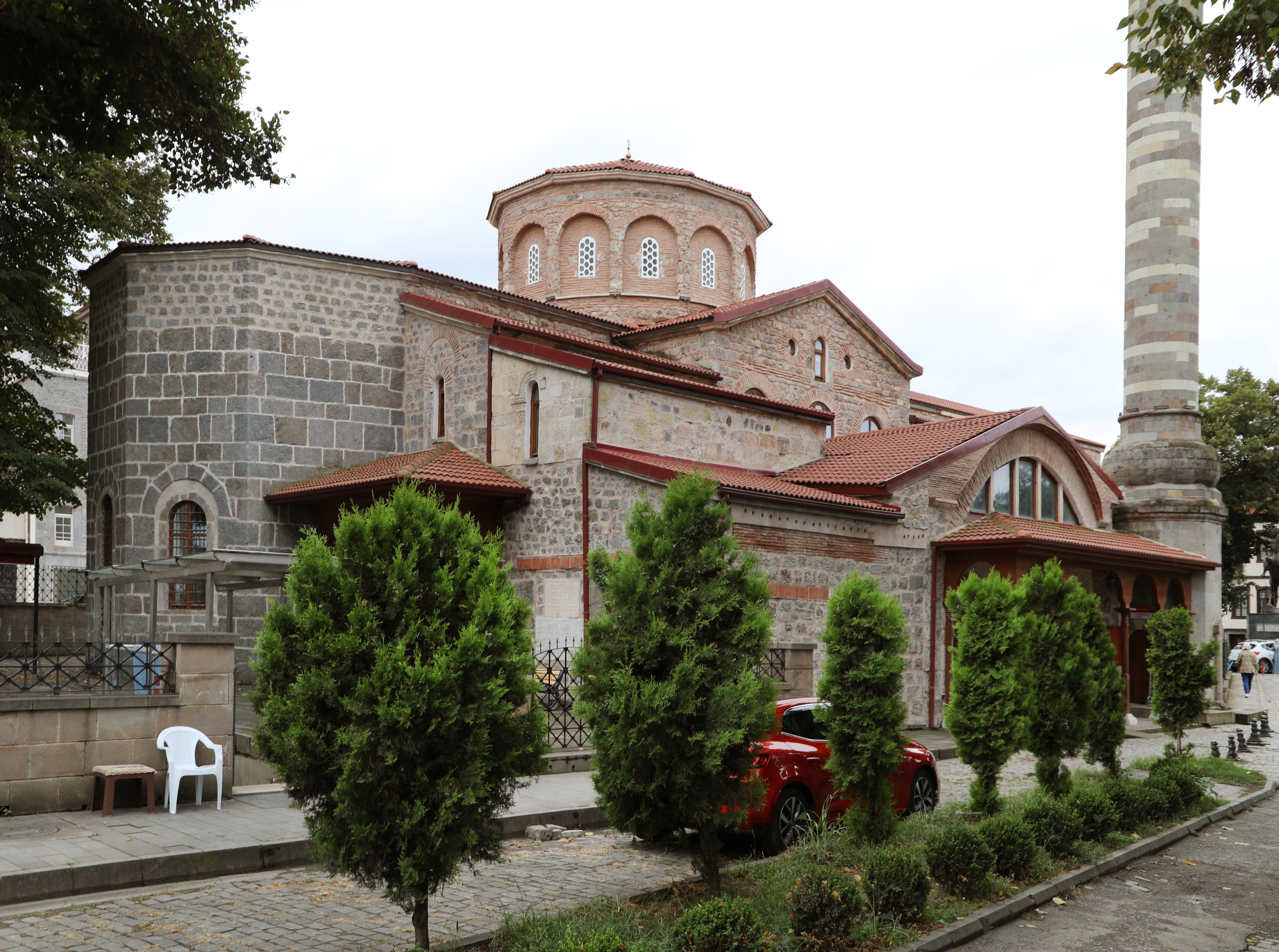
The 10th-century cathedral Panaghia Chrysokephalos (now Fatih Mosque), the most impressive Byzantine building in the city

By the time of Justinian I, the city served as an important base in his Persian Wars, and Miller notes that a portrait of the general Belisarius "long adorned the church of St. Basil." An inscription above the eastern gate of the city, commemorated the reconstruction of the civic walls at Justinian's expense following an earthquake. At some point before the 7th century, the university (Pandidakterion) of the city was reestablished with a quadrivium curriculum. The university drew students not just from the Byzantine Empire, but from Armenia as well.

Historical affiliations

Hittites c. 1600–1200 BC
Phrygia c. 800–695 BC
Achaemenid Empire c. 547–333 BC
Macedonian Empire 333–323 BC
Kingdom of Pontus c. 281–63 BC
Roman Empire 63 BC–395 AD
Byzantine Empire 395–1204
Empire of Trebizond 1204–1461
Ottoman Empire 1461–1922
Turkey 1923–present

The city regained importance when it became the seat of the theme of Chaldia. Trebizond also benefited when the trade route regained importance in the 8th to 10th centuries; 10th-century Muslim authors note that Trebizond was frequented by Muslim merchants, as the main source transshipping Byzantine silks into eastern Muslim countries. According to the 10th century Arab geographer Abulfeda, it was regarded as being largely a Lazian port. The Italian maritime republics such as the Republic of Venice and in particular the Republic of Genoa were active in the Black Sea trade for centuries, using Trebizond as an important seaport for trading goods between Europe and Asia. Some of the Silk Road caravans carrying goods from Asia stopped at the port of Trebizond, where the European merchants purchased these goods and carried them to the port cities of Europe with ships. This trade provided a source of revenue to the state in the form of custom duties, or kommerkiaroi, levied on the goods sold in Trebizond. The Greeks protected the coastal and inland trade routes with a vast network of garrison forts.

Following the Byzantine defeat at the Battle of Manzikert in 1071, Trebizond came under Seljuk rule. This rule proved transient when an expert soldier and local aristocrat, Theodore Gabras took control of the city from the Turkish invaders, and regarded Trebizond, in the words of Anna Comnena, "as a prize which had fallen to his own lot" and ruled it as his own kingdom. Supporting Comnena's assertion, Simon Bendall has identified a group of rare coins he believes was minted by Gabras and his successors. Although he was killed by the Turks in 1098, other members of his family continued his de facto independent rule into the next century.

=== Empire of Trebizond ===
The Empire of Trebizond was formed after a Georgian expedition in Chaldia, commanded by Alexios Komnenos a few weeks before the sack of Constantinople in 1204. Located at the far northeastern corner of Anatolia, it was the longest surviving of the Byzantine successor states. Byzantine authors, such as Pachymeres, and to some extent Trapezuntines such as Lazaropoulos and Bessarion, regarded the Trebizond Empire as being no more than a Lazian border state. Thus, from the point of view of the Byzantine writers connected with the Lascaris and later with the Palaiologos, the rulers of Trebizond were not emperors.

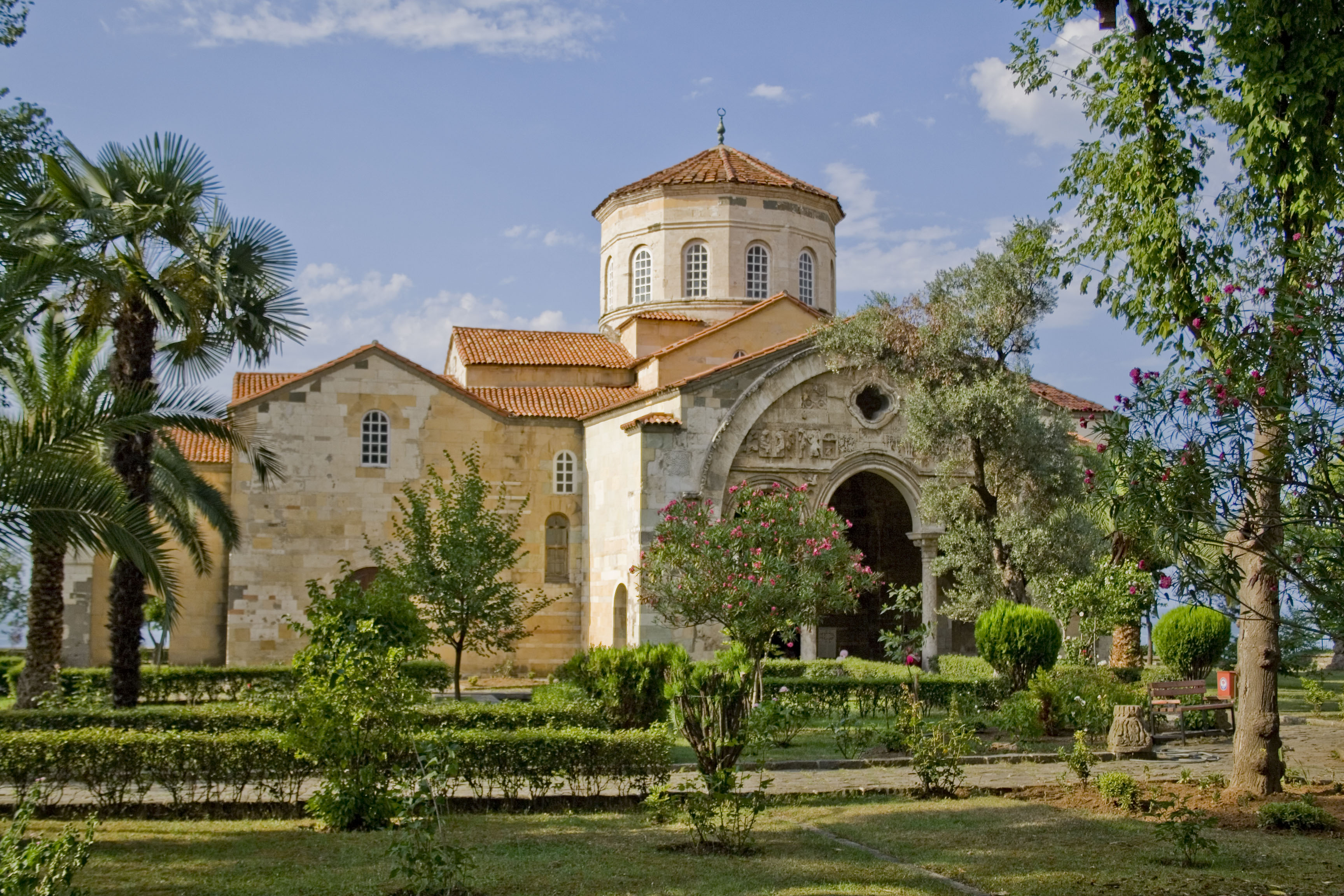
Hagia Sophia
(now Ayasofya mosque & museum)

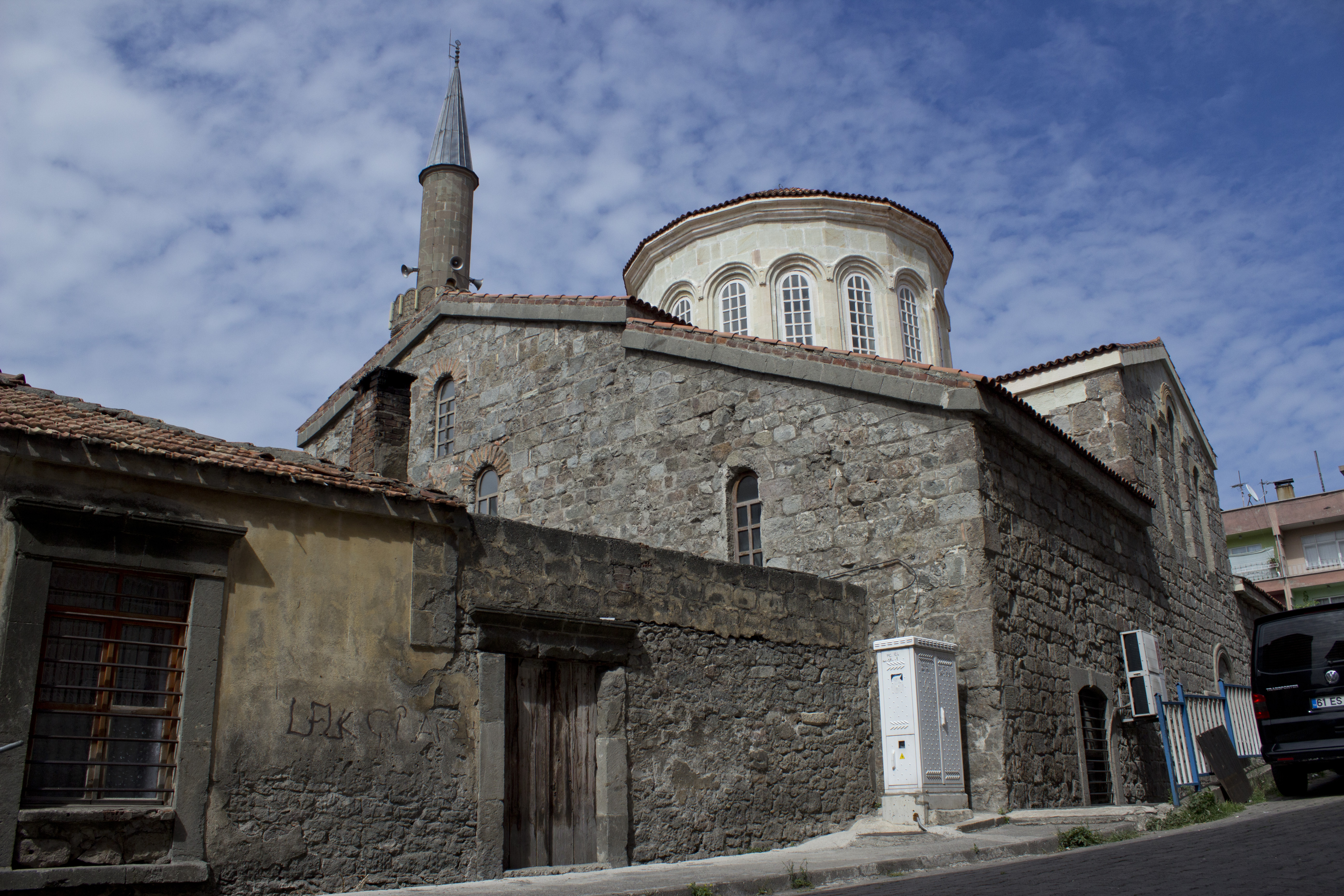
Hagios Eugenios
(now Yeni Cuma Mosque)

The young empire required new buildings to honor its name. Their architectural style differs from previous Byzantine architecture, while still retaining many features. Caucasian and Eastern Anatolian influences are especially evident in Hagia Sophia.

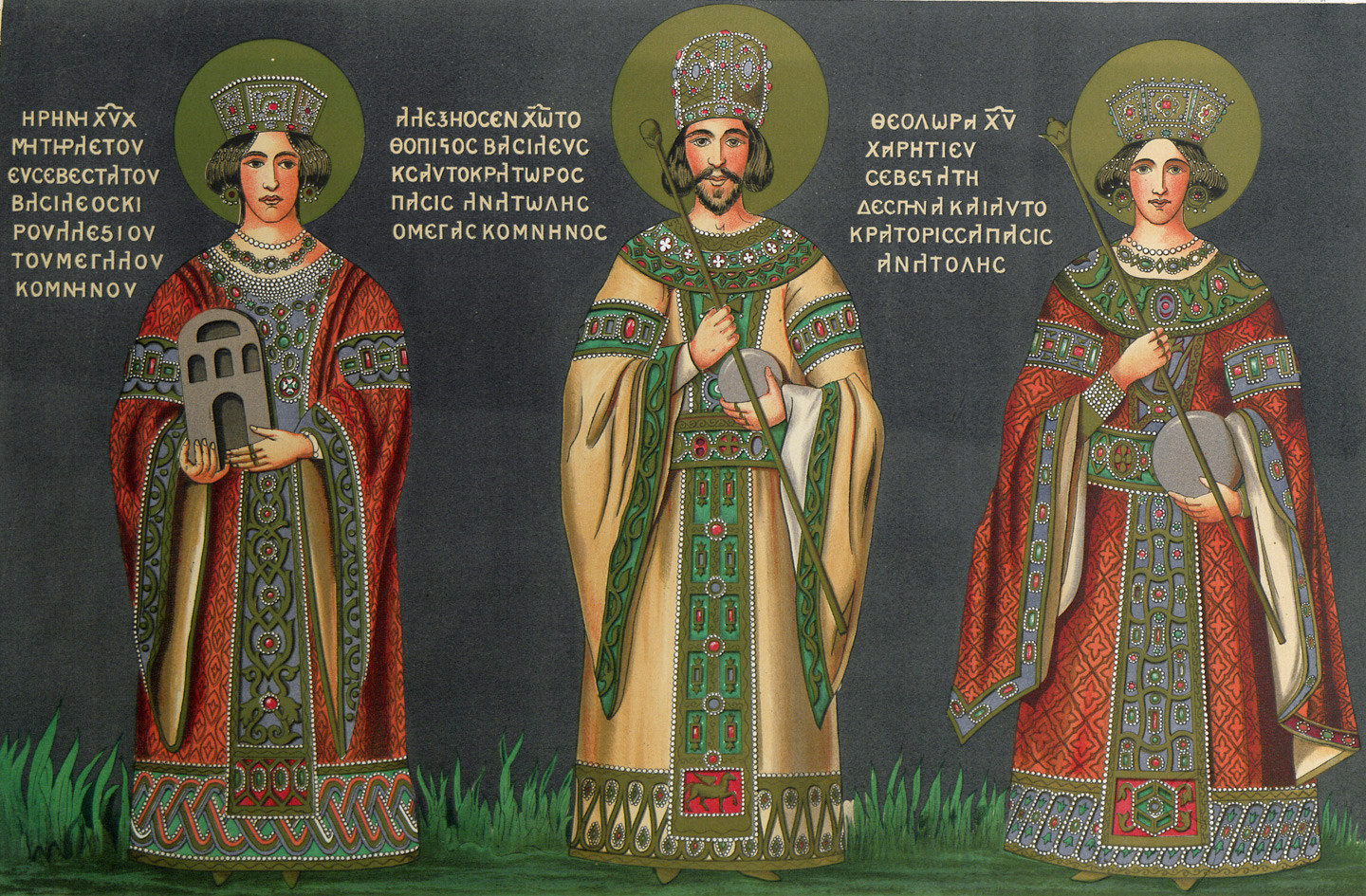
Fresco of Alexios III between his wife and mother at the Panagia Theoskepastos Monastery, as drawn by Charles Texier

Geographically, the Empire of Trebizond consisted of little more than a narrow strip along the southern coast of the Black Sea, and not much further inland than the Pontic Mountains. However, the city gained great wealth from the taxes it levied on the goods traded between Persia and Europe via the Black Sea. The Mongol siege of Baghdad in 1258 diverted more trade caravans towards the city. Genoese and to a lesser extent Venetian traders regularly came to Trebizond. To secure their part of the Black Sea trade, the Genoese bought the coastal fortification "Leonkastron", just west of the winter harbour, in the year 1306. The Venetians likewise built a trading outpost in the city, a few hundred meters to the west of the Genoese. In between these two Italian colonies settled many other European traders, and it thus became known as the "European Quarter". Small groups of Italians continued to live in the city until the early decades of the 20th century. One of the most famous persons to have visited the city in this period was Marco Polo, who ended his overland return journey at the port of Trebizond, and sailed to his hometown Venice with a ship; passing by Constantinople (Istanbul) on the way, which was retaken by the Byzantines in 1261.

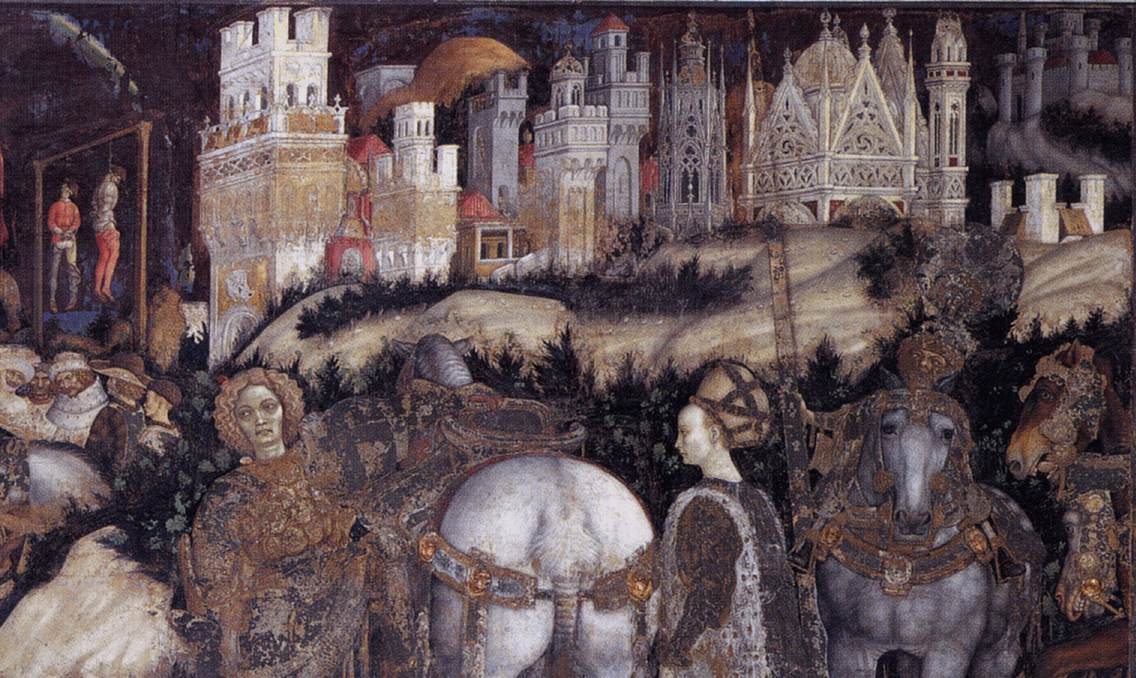
Fantastical depiction of Trebizond by Pisanello in a fresco of the Sant'Anastasia church in Verona, painted between 1436 and 1438

Together with Persian goods, Italian traders brought stories about the city to Western Europe. Trebizond played a mythical role in European literature of the late Middle Ages and the Renaissance. Miguel de Cervantes and François Rabelais gave their protagonists the desire to possess the city. Next to literature, the legendary history of the city – and that of the Pontus in general – also influenced the creation of paintings, theatre plays and operas in Western Europe throughout the following centuries.

The city also played a role in the early Renaissance; the western takeover of Constantinople, which formalized Trebizond's political independence, also led Byzantine intellectuals to seek refuge in the city. Especially Alexios II of Trebizond and his grandson Alexios III were patrons of the arts and sciences. After the great city fire of 1310, the ruined university was reestablished. As part of the university Gregory Choniades opened a new academy of astronomy, which housed the best observatory outside Persia. Choniades brought with him the works of Shams al-Din al-Bukhari, Nasir al-Din al-Tusi and Abd al-Rahman al-Khazini from Tabriz, which he translated into Greek. These works later found their way to western Europe, together with the astrolabe. The observatory Choniades built would become known for its accurate solar eclipse predictions, but was probably used mostly for astrological purposes for the emperor and/or the church. Scientists and philosophers of Trebizond were among the first western thinkers to compare contemporaneous theories with classical Greek texts. Basilios Bessarion and George of Trebizond travelled to Italy and taught and published works on Plato and Aristotle, starting a fierce debate and literary tradition that continues to this day on the topic of national identity and global citizenship. They were so influential that Bessarion was considered for the position of Pope, and George could survive as an academic even after being defamed for his heavy criticism of Plato.

The Black Death arrived at the city in September 1347, probably via Kaffa. At that time the local aristocracy was engaged in the Trapezuntine Civil War.

In 1340, Tur Ali Beg, an early ancestor of the Aq Qoyunlu, raided Trebizond. In 1348, he besieged Trebizond, however he failed and lifted the siege. Later on, Alexios III of Trebizond gave his sister to Kutlu Beg son of Tur Ali Beg, and established a kinship with them.

Constantinople remained the Byzantine capital until it was conquered by the Ottoman Sultan Mehmed II in 1453, who also conquered Trebizond eight years later, in 1461.

Its demographic legacy endured for several centuries after the Ottoman conquest in 1461, as a substantial number of Greek Orthodox inhabitants, usually referred to as Pontic Greeks, continued to live in the area during Ottoman rule, up until 1923, when they were deported to Greece. A few thousand Greek Muslims still live in the area, mostly in the Çaykara-Of dialectical region to the southeast of Trabzon. Most are Sunni Muslim, while there are some recent converts in the city and possibly a few Crypto-Christians in the Tonya/Gümüşhane area to the southwest of the city. Compared to most previously Greek cities in Turkey, a large amount of its Greek Byzantine architectural heritage survives as well.

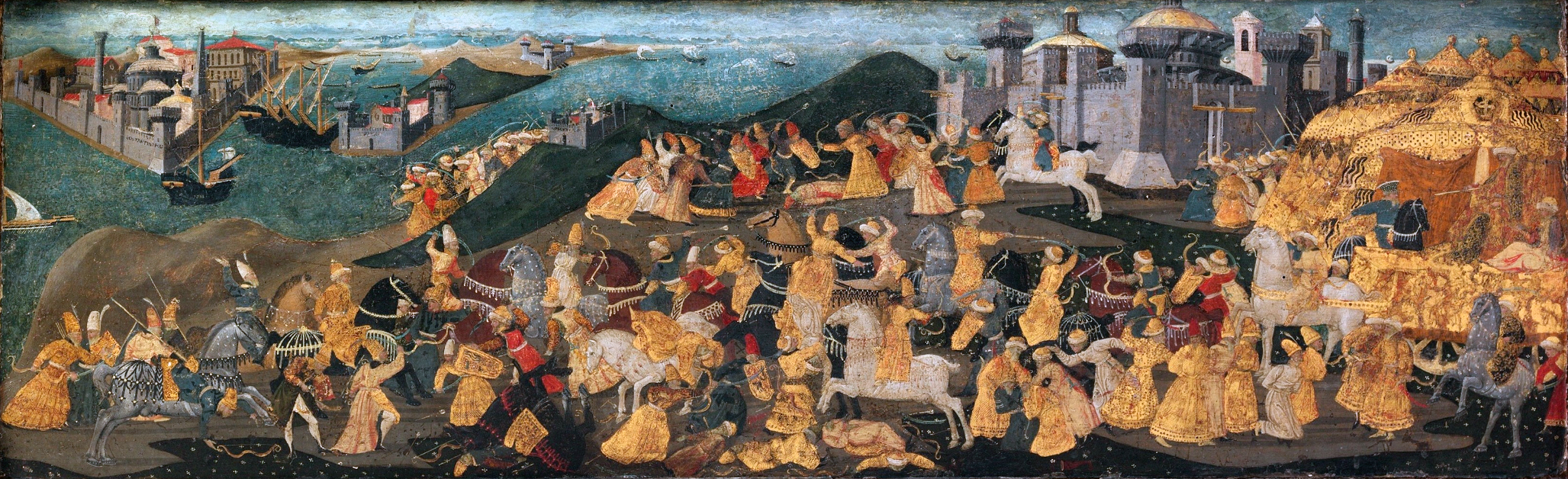
The Cassone with the 'Conquest of Trebizond' by Apollonio di Giovanni di Tomaso, on display at the Metropolitan Museum of Art in New York. Painted just after the fall of the city, it depicts Trebizond as being equal to Constantinople (at the far left). Even the battle displayed in between the two cities was mostly a fantasy. The city held a legendary place in Western European literature and thought throughout the late medieval period and the renaissance, with a lasting influence that can be felt even to present times.

=== Ottoman era ===
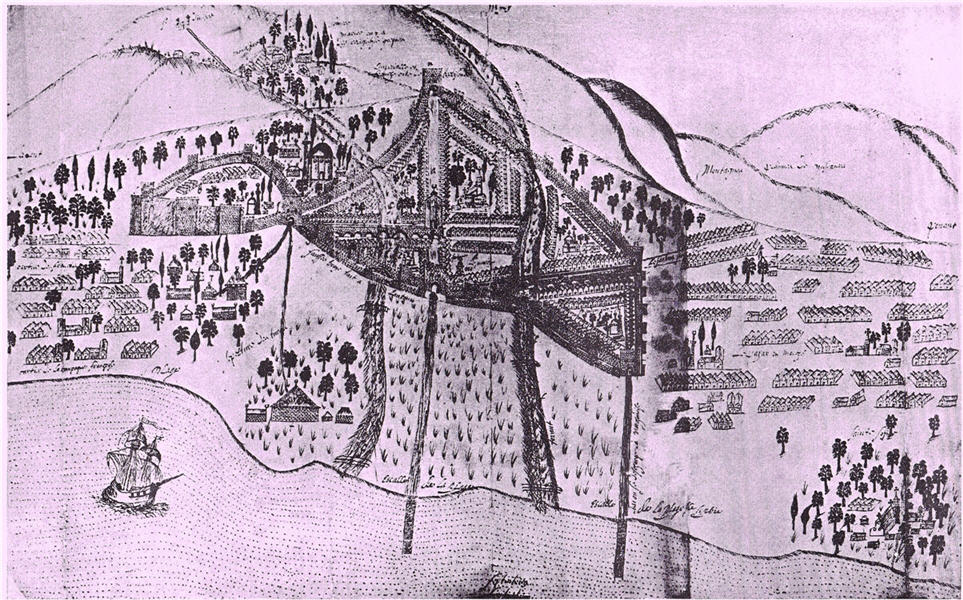
The first known plan of Trebizond, drawn around 1604–1610 by Julien Bordier. Many characteristics of the city can be recognized: the two streams dividing the central core, the separately walled quarters, the Genoese town next to the winter harbour, Haghia Sophia at the bottom right, and Boztepe hill at the top left.

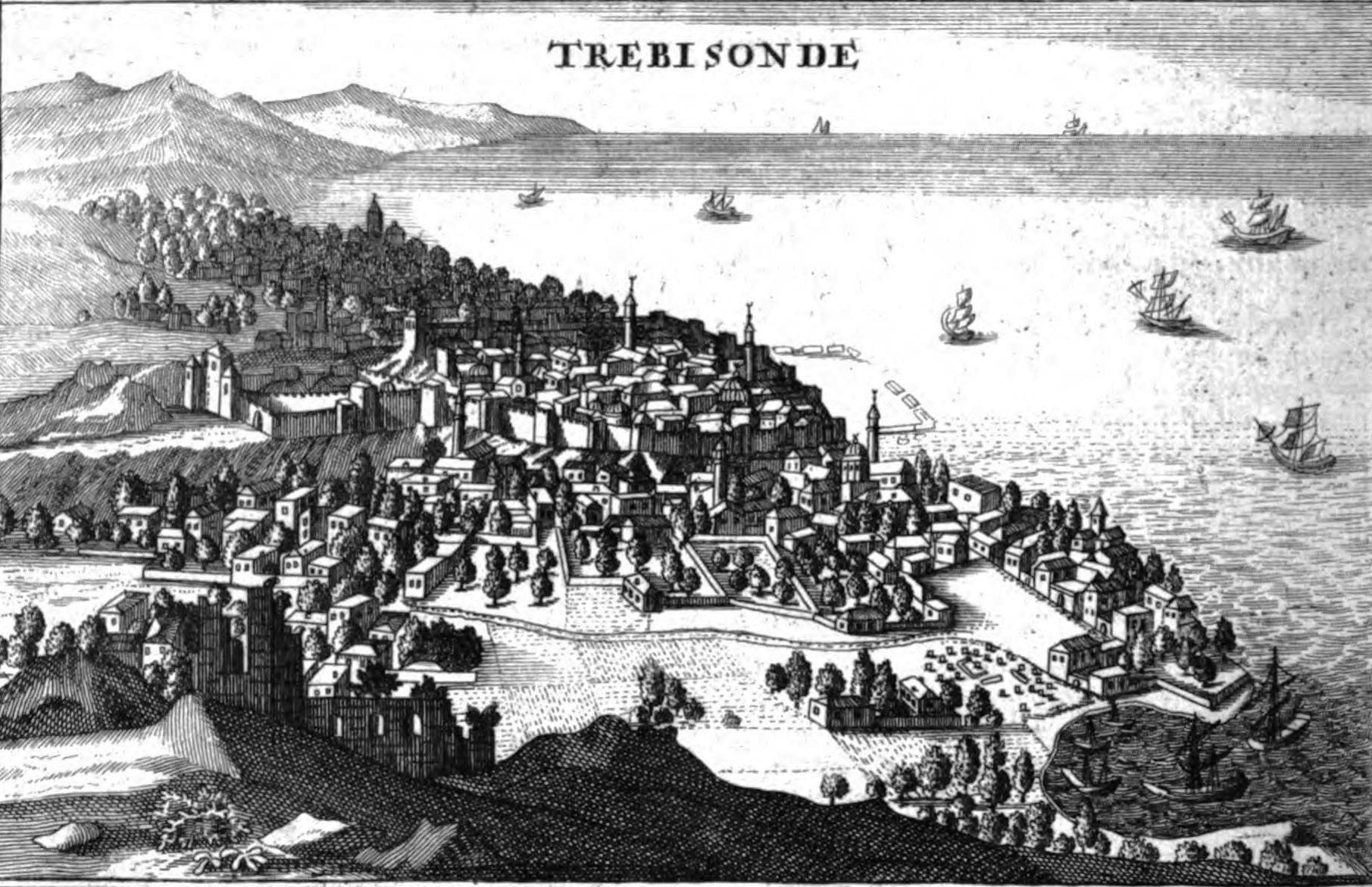
The first city-view of Trebizond, published by Joseph Pitton de Tournefort after a drawing by himself or his assistant Claude Aubriet during a visit in 1701. The view shows the city from Haghia Sophia in the distance all the way to the winter harbour. The drawing was made from Boztepe, which is still the most popular place to view the city.

The last Emperor of Trebizond, David, surrendered the city to Sultan Mehmed II of the Ottoman Empire in 1461. Following this takeover, Mehmed II sent many Turkish settlers into the area, but the old ethnic Greek, Laz and Armenian communities remained. According to the Ottoman tax books (tahrir defterleri), the total population of taxable adult males (only those with a household) in the city was 1,473 in the year 1523. The total population of the city was much higher. Approximately 85% of the population was Christian, and 15% Muslim. Thirteen percent of the adult males belonged to the Armenian community, while the vast majority of Christians were Greeks. However, a significant portion of the local Christians were Islamized by the end of the 17th century - especially those outside the city - according to a research by Prof. Halil İnalcık on the Ottoman tax books (tahrir defterleri). Between 1461 and 1598 Trabzon remained the administrative center of the wider region; first as 'sanjac center' of Rum Eyalet, later of Erzincan-Bayburt eyalet, Anadolu Eyalet, and Erzurum Eyalet.

In 1598, it became the capital of its own province - the Eyalet of Trebizond - which in 1867 became the Vilayet of Trebizond. During the reign of Sultan Bayezid II, his son Prince Selim (later Sultan Selim I) was the Sanjak-bey of Trabzon, and Selim I's son Suleiman the Magnificent was born in Trabzon in 1494. The Ottoman government often appointed local Chepni Turks and Laz beys as the regional beylerbey. It is also recorded that some Bosniaks were appointed by the Sublime Porte as the regional beylerbeys in Trabzon. The Eyalet of Trabzon had always sent troops for the Ottoman campaigns in Europe during the 16th and 17th centuries.

In the mid-17th century, the Ottoman traveler Evliya Çelebi recorded a local legend to explain the absence of a Jewish community in Trabzon. According to the tale, set during Selim I's rule of the city, two Muslim boys disappear and are given up for lost; twenty years later, after a dervish discovers a coded message on a piece of a leather at the market, revealing that they have been held captive in a Jewish-owned tannery. The rescuers find the brothers alive but mutilated, and learn that hundreds of other boys named Mehmed had been killed or enslaved there. Enraged, the townspeople seal the citadel gates and massacre the city's entire Jewish population, including women, children and infants, also obtaining imperial sanctions to kill any Jew found in the city. Çelebi presented it under the chapter title "A really nice story". Hakan T. Karateke observes that while the story is not "technically a blood libel", as the boys were not taken for ritual use of their blood, "it is clearly a story in a similar vein".

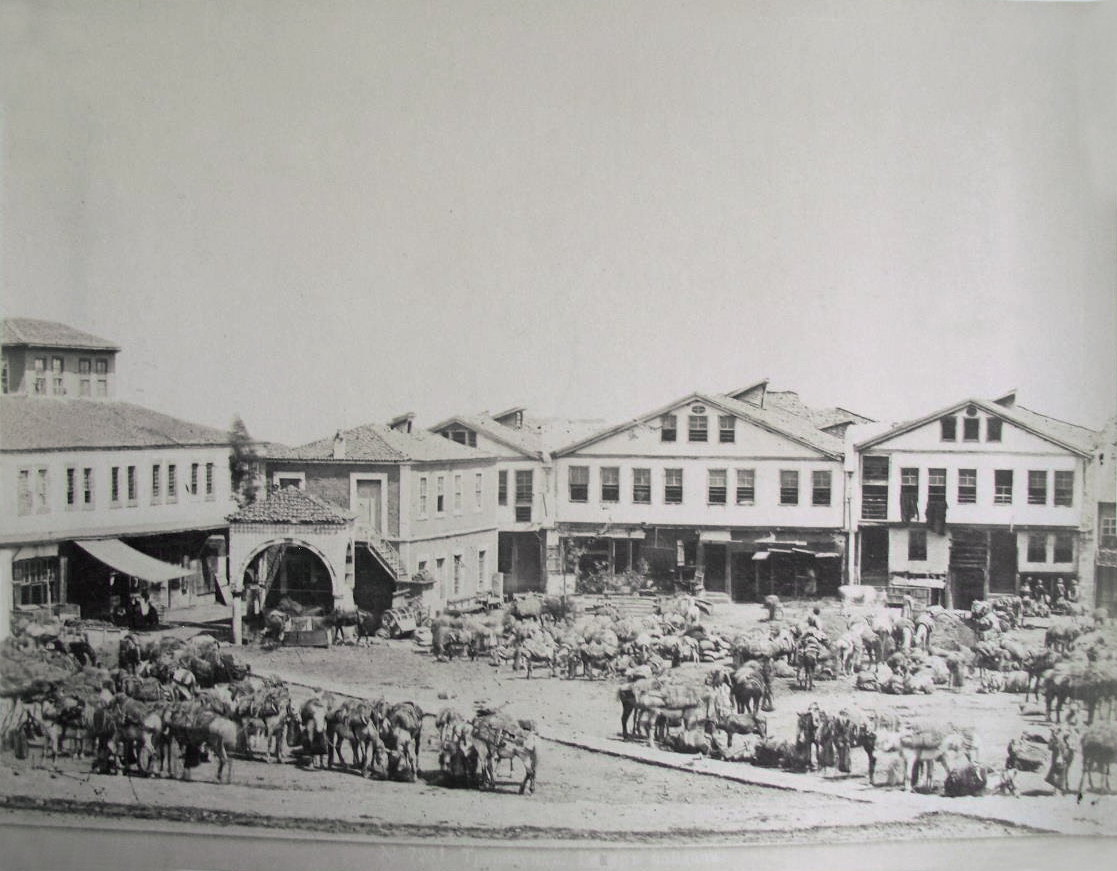
Trebizond Meydan around 1868, Dmitri Ivanovich Yermakov

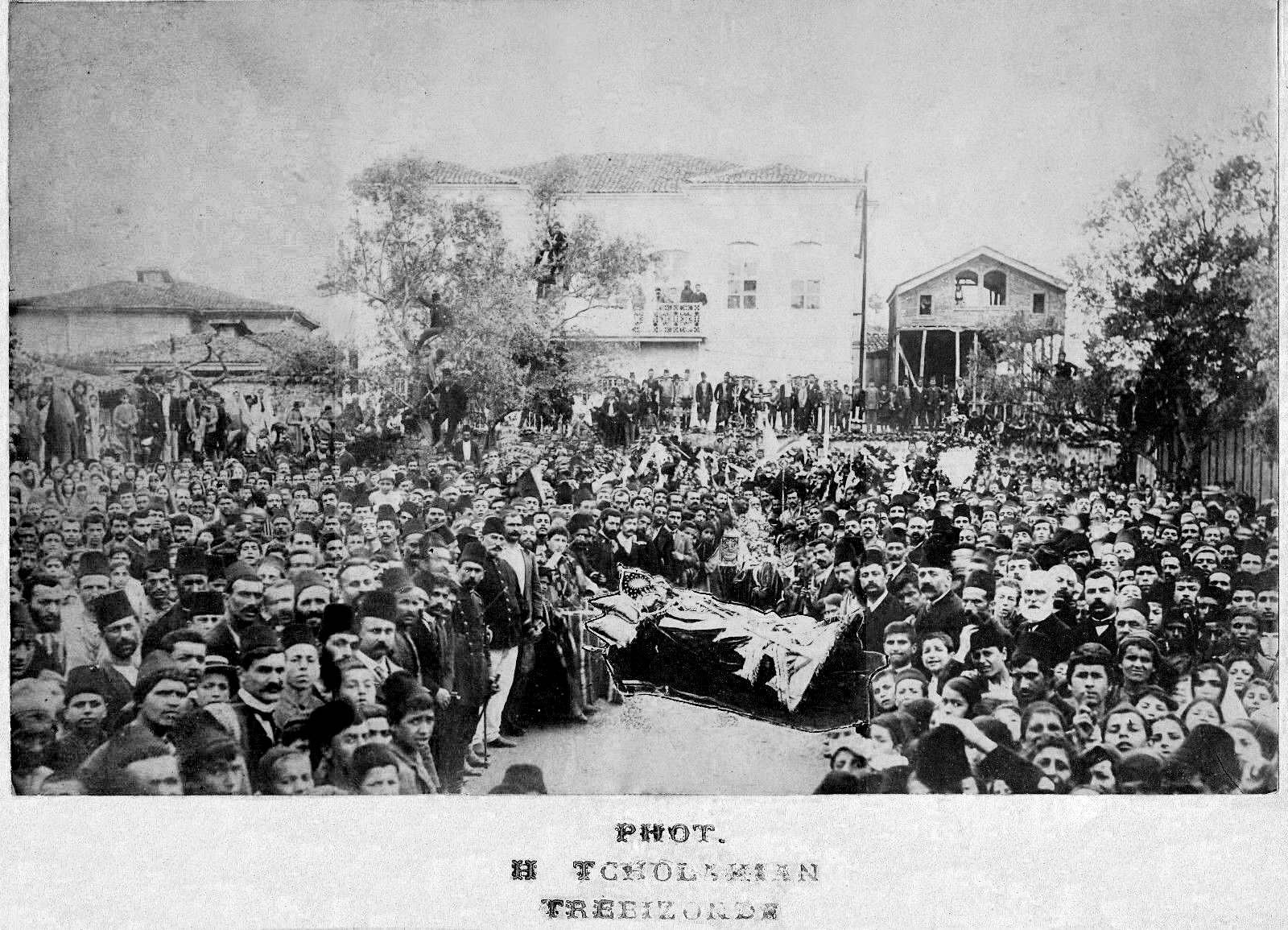
Men and woman gathered for the funeral of an Armenian cleric. Hatchik Tcholakian, 1892.

Trebizond had a wealthy merchant class during the late Ottoman period, and the local Christian minority had a substantial influence in terms of culture, economy and politics. A number of European consulates were opened in the city due to its importance in regional trade and commerce. In the first half of the 19th century, Trebizond even became the main port for Persian exports. The opening of the Suez Canal greatly diminished the international trading position of the city, but did not halt the economic development of the region. In the last decades of the 19th century, the city saw some demographic changes. As the population of the province greatly expanded due to increased living standards, many families and young men - mostly Christians, but also some Jews and Greek or Turkish speaking Muslims - chose to migrate to the Crimea and southern Ukraine, in search for farmland or employment in one of the cities which had been newly established there. Among these migrants were the grandparents of Bob Dylan and Greek politicians and artists. Many Christian and Muslim families from Trabzon also moved to Constantinople, where they established businesses or sought employment - such as the grandfather of Ahmet Ertegün. These migrants were active in a wide range of trades including baking, confection, tailoring, carpentry, education, advocacy, politics and administration. The influence of this diaspora has since continued, and can still be seen in the many restaurants and shops in cities around the Black Sea in the 21st century such as in Istanbul, Odesa and Mariupol. At the same time, thousands of Muslim refugees from the Caucasus arrived in the city, especially after 1864, in what is known as the Circassian genocide.

Next to Constantinople, Smyrna (now İzmir) and Salonika (now Thessaloniki), Trebizond was one of the cities where western cultural and technological innovations were first introduced to the Ottoman Empire. In 1835, the American Board of Commissioners for Foreign Missions opened the Trebizond Mission station that it occupied from 1835 to 1859 and from 1882 to at least 1892. Hundreds of schools were constructed in the province during the first half of the 19th century, giving the region one of the highest literacy rates of the empire. First, the Greek community set up their schools, but soon the Muslim and Armenian communities followed. International schools were also established in the city; An American school, five French schools, a Persian school and a number of Italian schools were opened in the second half of the 19th century. The city got a post office in 1845. New churches and mosques were built in the second half of the 19th century, as well as the first theater, public and private printing houses, multiple photo studios and banks. The oldest known photographs of the city center date from the 1860s and depict one of the last camel trains from Persia.

Between one and two thousand Armenians are believed to have been killed in the Trebizond vilayet during the Hamidian massacres of 1895. While this number was low in comparison to other Ottoman provinces, its impact on the Armenian community in the city was large. Many prominent Armenian residents, among them scholars, musicians, photographers and painters, decided to migrate towards the Russian Empire or France. The large Greek population of the city was not affected by the massacre. Ivan Aivazovsky made the painting Massacre of the Armenians in Trebizond 1895 based on the events. Due to the high number of Western Europeans in the city, news from the region was being reported on in many European newspapers. These western newspapers were in turn also very popular among the residents of the city.

Ottoman era paintings and drawings of Trebizond

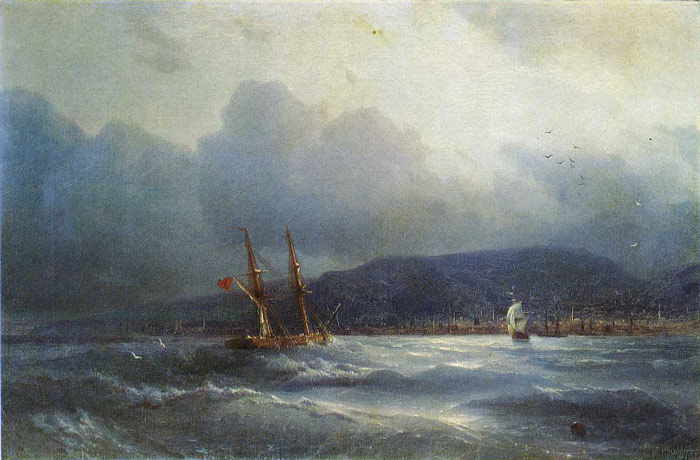
Trebizond from the sea by Ivan Aivazovsky

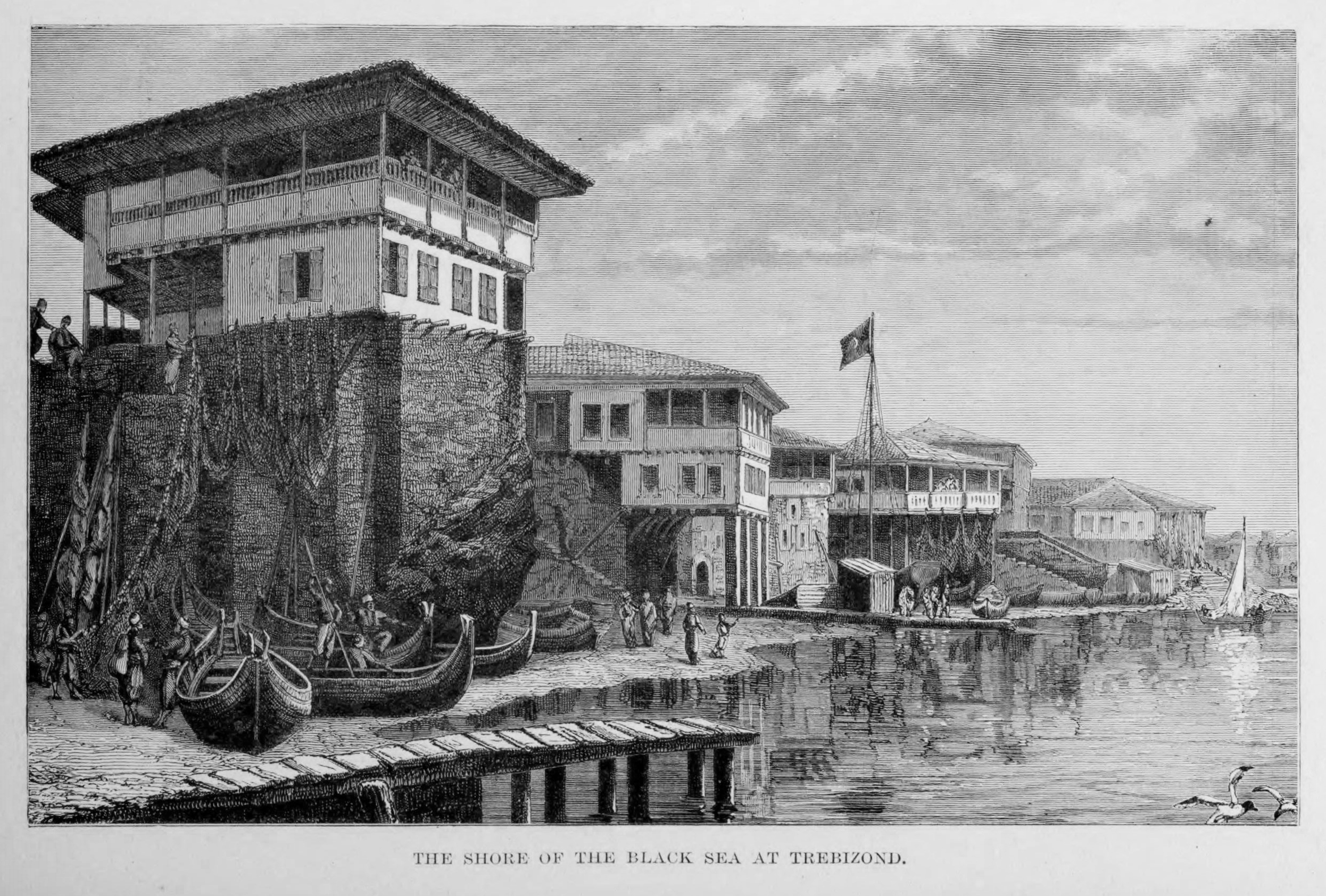
Engraving of the port at Çömlekçi by C. Lapante

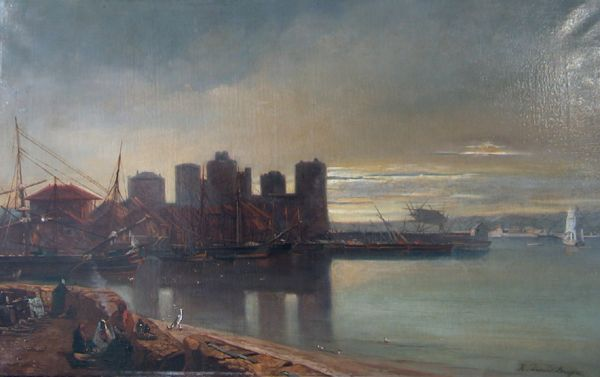
Trebizond by Jean-Baptiste Henri Durand-Brager

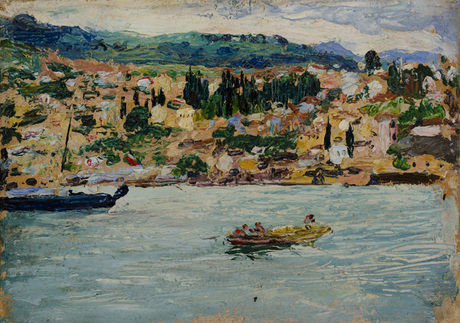
Trebizond from the sea by Yeghishe Tadevosyan

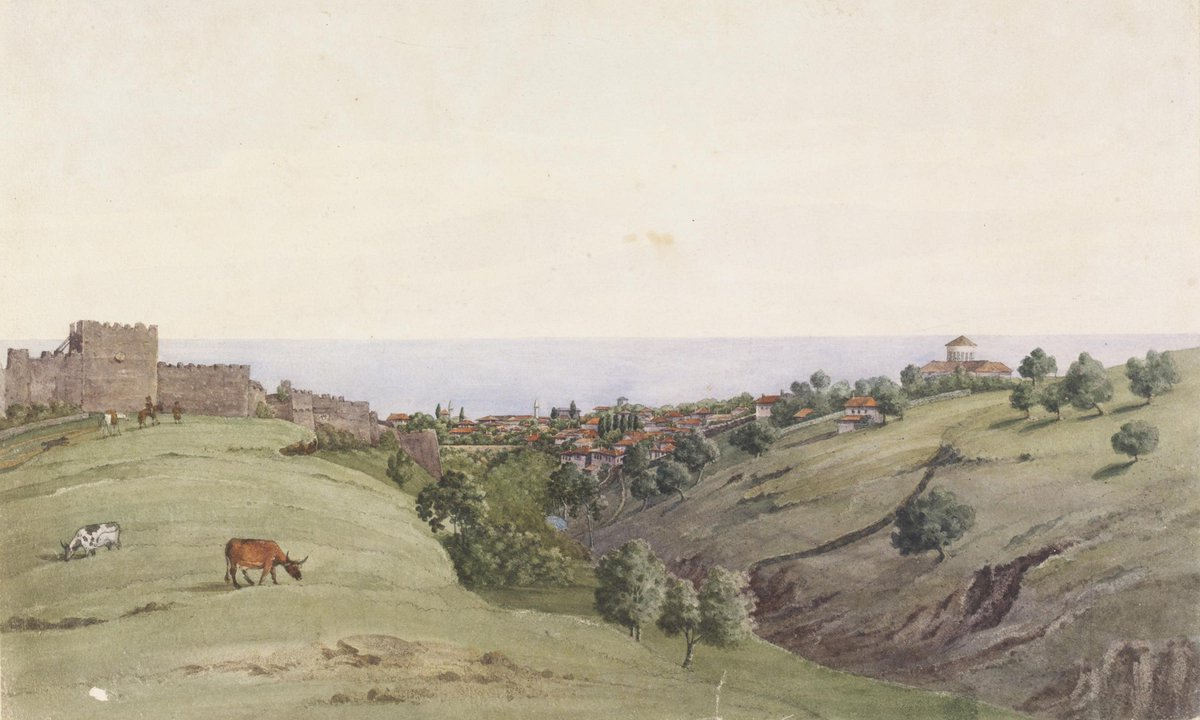
Trebizond from the south by Godfrey Vigne

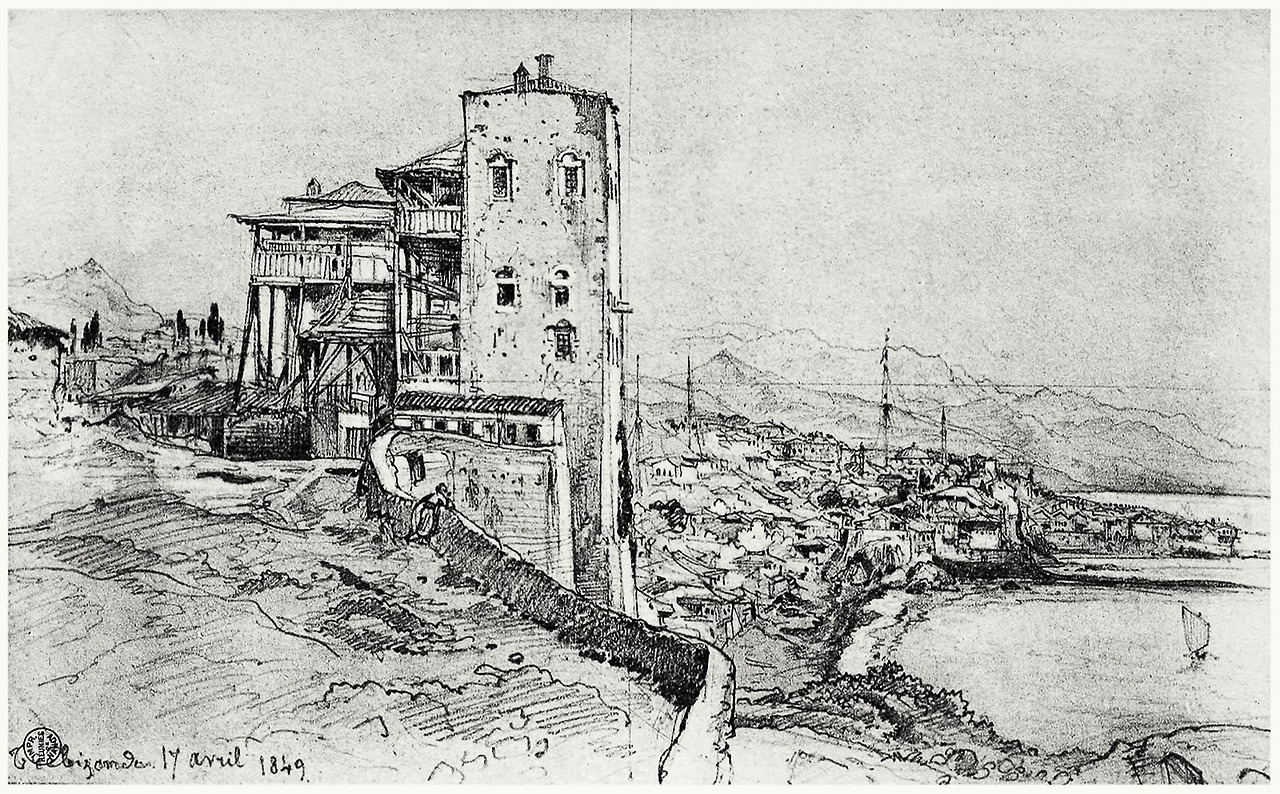
The quarantine station by Jules Laurens

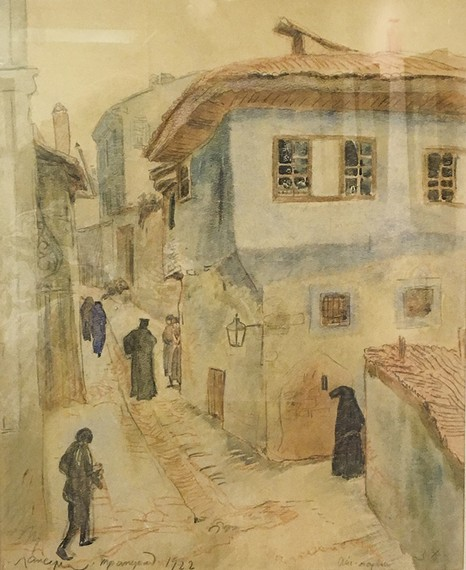
Street view by Nikolay Lanceray
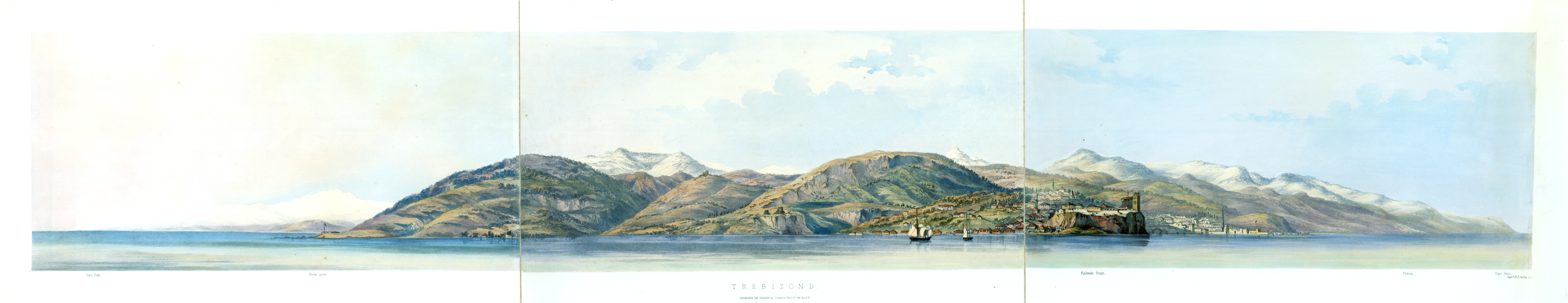
Lithograph of Trebizond from the sea by the Dickinson Brothers of London, 1853. It shows the city from 'Khonsi point' at the left to Platana (Akçaabat) at the right. This is the first impression most European travellers got of the city (in good weather) until the second half of the 20th century.

=== Modern era ===
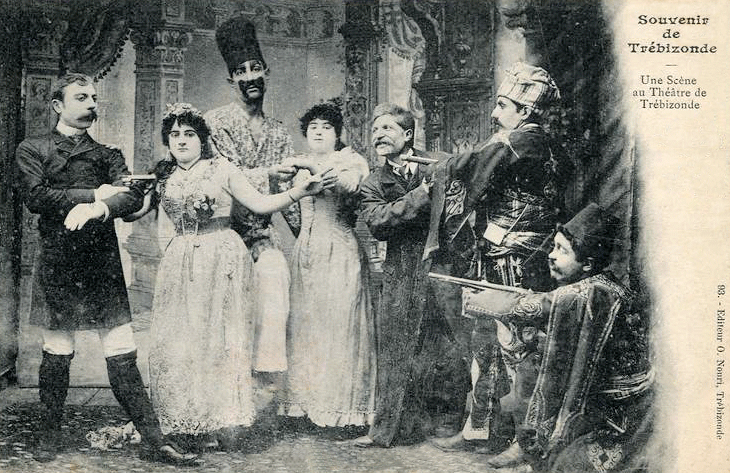
A theater performance in Trebizond c. 1900

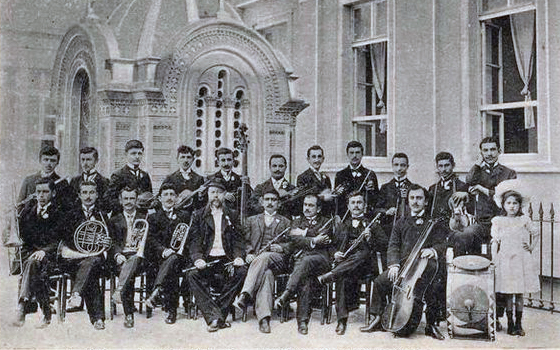
The Philharmonic orchestra of Trebizond

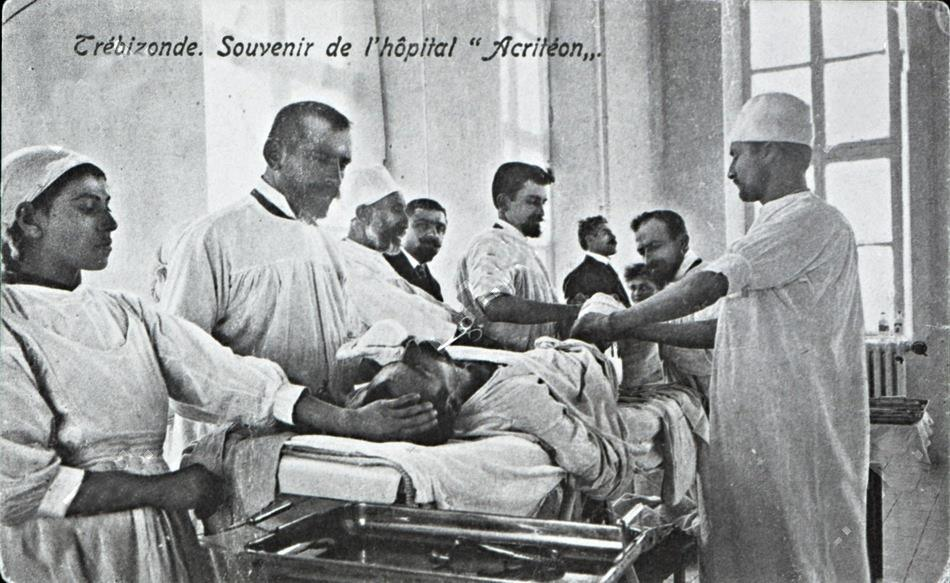
Operating room of the Acriteon Hospital

In 1901, the harbour was equipped with cranes by Stothert & Pitt of Bath in England. In 1912, the Sümer Opera House was opened on the central Meydan square, being one of the first in the empire. The start of the First World War brought an abrupt end to the relatively peaceful and prosperous period the city had seen during the previous century. First Trebizond would lose many of its young male citizens at the Battle of Sarikamish in the winter of 1914–15, while during those same months the Russian navy bombarded the city a total of five times, taking 1300 lives. Especially the port quarter Çömlekçi and surrounding neighborhoods were targeted.

In July 1915, most of the adult male Armenians of the city were marched off south in five convoys, towards the mines of Gümüşhane, never to be seen again. Other victims of the Armenian genocide were reportedly taken out to sea in boats which were then capsized. In some areas of Trebizond province - such as the Karadere river valley in modern-day Araklı, 25 kilometers east of the city - the local Muslim population tried to protect the Christian Armenians.

The coastal region between the city and the Russian frontier became the site of key battles between the Ottoman and Russian armies during the Trebizond Campaign, as part of the Caucasus Campaign of World War I. The Russian army landed at Atina, east of Rize on March 4, 1916. Lazistan Sanjak fell within two days. However, due to heavy guerrilla resistance around Of and Çaykara some 50 km to the east of Trabzon, it took a further 40 days for the Russian army to advance west. The Ottoman administration of Trabzon foresaw the fall of the city and called for a meeting with community leaders, where they handed control of the city to Greek metropolitan bishop Chrysantos Philippidis.

Chrysantos promised to protect the Muslim population of the city. Ottoman forces retreated from Trabzon, and on April 15 the city was taken without a fight by the Russian Caucasus Army under command of Grand Duke Nicholas and Nikolai Yudenich. There was also a massacre of Armenians and Greeks in Trabzon just before the Russian takeover of the city.

In early 1917, Chrysantos tried to broker a peace between the Russians and the Ottomans, to no avail. During the Russian Revolution of 1917, Russian soldiers in the city turned to rioting and looting, with officers commandeering Trebizonian ships to flee the scene. Governor Chrysantos was able to calm the Russian soldiers down, and the Russian Army ultimately retreated from the city and the rest of eastern and northeastern Anatolia. In March and April 1918, the city hosted the Trebizond Peace Conference, where the Ottomans agreed to give up their military gains in the Caucasus in return for recognition of the eastern borders of the empire in Anatolia by the Transcaucasian Seim (a short-lived transcaucasian government).

In December 1918, Trabzon deputy governor Hafız Mehmet gave a speech at the Ottoman parliament in which he blamed the former governor of Trebizond province Cemal Azmi – a non-native appointee who had fled to Germany after the Russian invasion – for orchestrating the Armenian genocide in the city in 1915, by means of drowning. Subsequently, a series of war crimes trials were held in Trebizond in early 1919 (see Trebizond during the Armenian genocide). Among others, Cemal Azmi was sentenced to death in absentia.

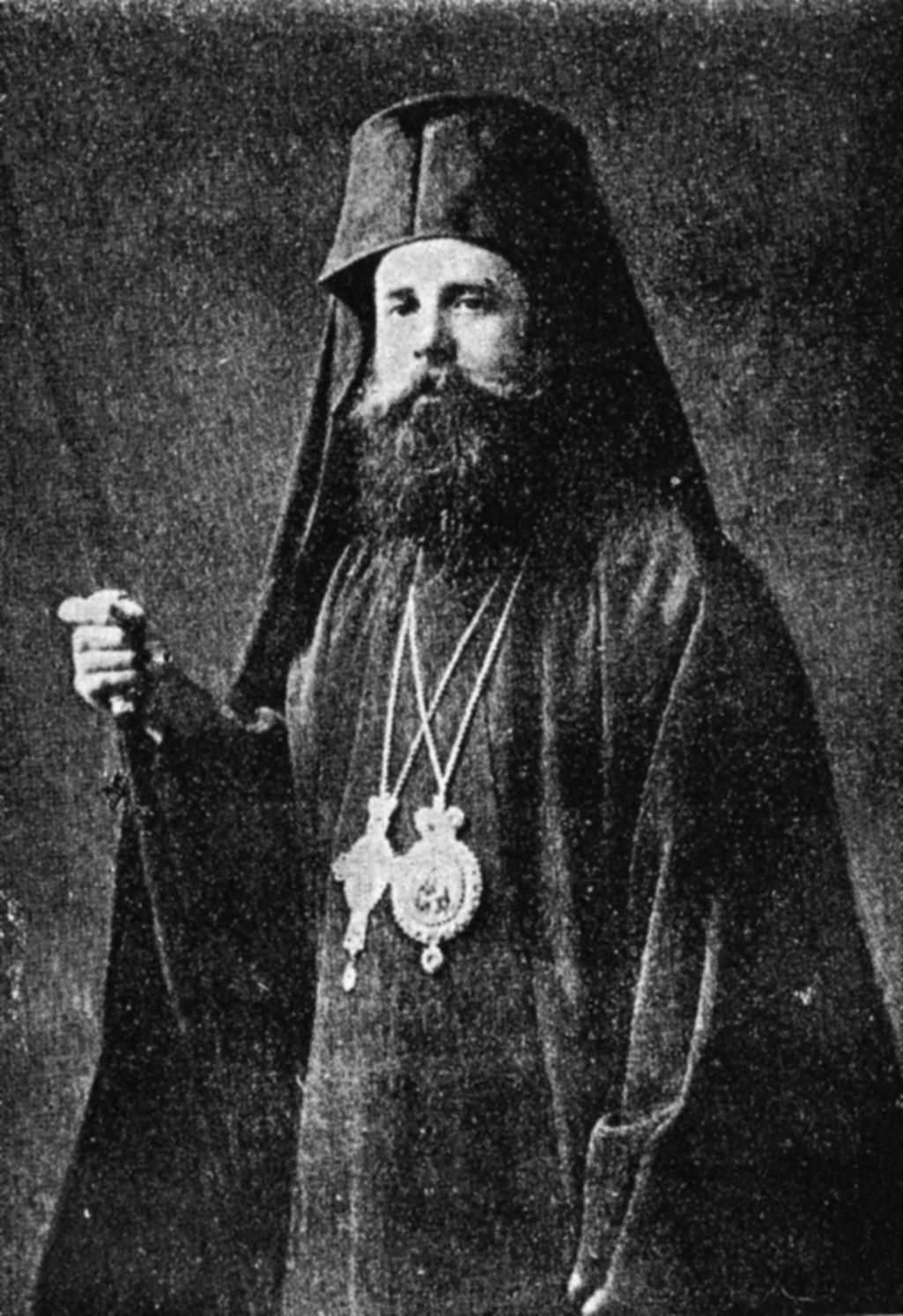
Chrysanthos Philippidis, metropolitan and governor of Trabzon during part of the First World War. He protected the local population, regardless of religion or ethnicity.

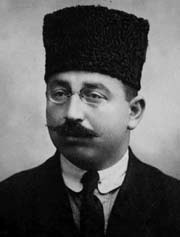
Ali Şükrü Bey, publisher and politician from Trabzon who opposed violence against ethnic minorities and paid the ultimate price for his criticism of Mustafa Kemal

During the Turkish War of Independence, several Christian Pontic Greek communities in the Trebizond province rebelled against the new army of Mustafa Kemal (notably in Bafra and Santa), but when nationalist Greeks came to Trabzon to proclaim revolution, they were not received with open arms by the local Pontic Greek population of the city. At the same time, the Muslim population of the city, remembering their protection under Greek governor Chrysantos, protested the arrest of prominent Christians. Liberal delegates of Trebizond opposed the election of Mustafa Kemal as the leader of the Turkish revolution at the Erzurum Congress.

The governor and mayor of Trebizond were appalled by the violence against Ottoman Greek subjects, and the government of Trabzon thus refused arms to Mustafa Kemal's henchman Topal Osman, who was responsible for mass murders in the western Pontus which were part of the Greek genocide. Osman was forced out of the city by armed Turkish port-workers. Governor Chrysantos travelled to the Paris Peace Conference, where he proposed the establishment of the Republic of Pontus, which would protect its different ethnic groups. For this he was condemned to death by the Turkish Nationalist forces, and he could not return to his post in Trebizond. Instead, the city was to be handed to 'Wilsonian Armenia', which likewise never materialized. Following the war, the Treaty of Sèvres was annulled and replaced with the Treaty of Lausanne (1923). As part of this new treaty, Trebizond became part of the new Turkish Republic. The efforts of the pro-Ottoman, anti-nationalist population of Trebizond only postponed the inevitable, because the national governments of Turkey and Greece agreed to a mutual forced population exchange. This exchange included well over 100,000 Greeks from Trebizond and the vicinity, who moved to Greece (founding the new towns of Nea Trapezounta, Pieria and Nea Trapezounta, Grevena amongst others).

During the war, Trebizond parliamentarian Ali Şükrü Bey had been one of the leading figures of the first Turkish opposition party. In his newspaper Tan, Şükrü and colleagues publicized critiques of the Kemalist government, such as towards the violence perpetrated against Greeks during the population exchange. Şükrü argued that recognition of ethnic diversity was not a threat to the Turkish nation.

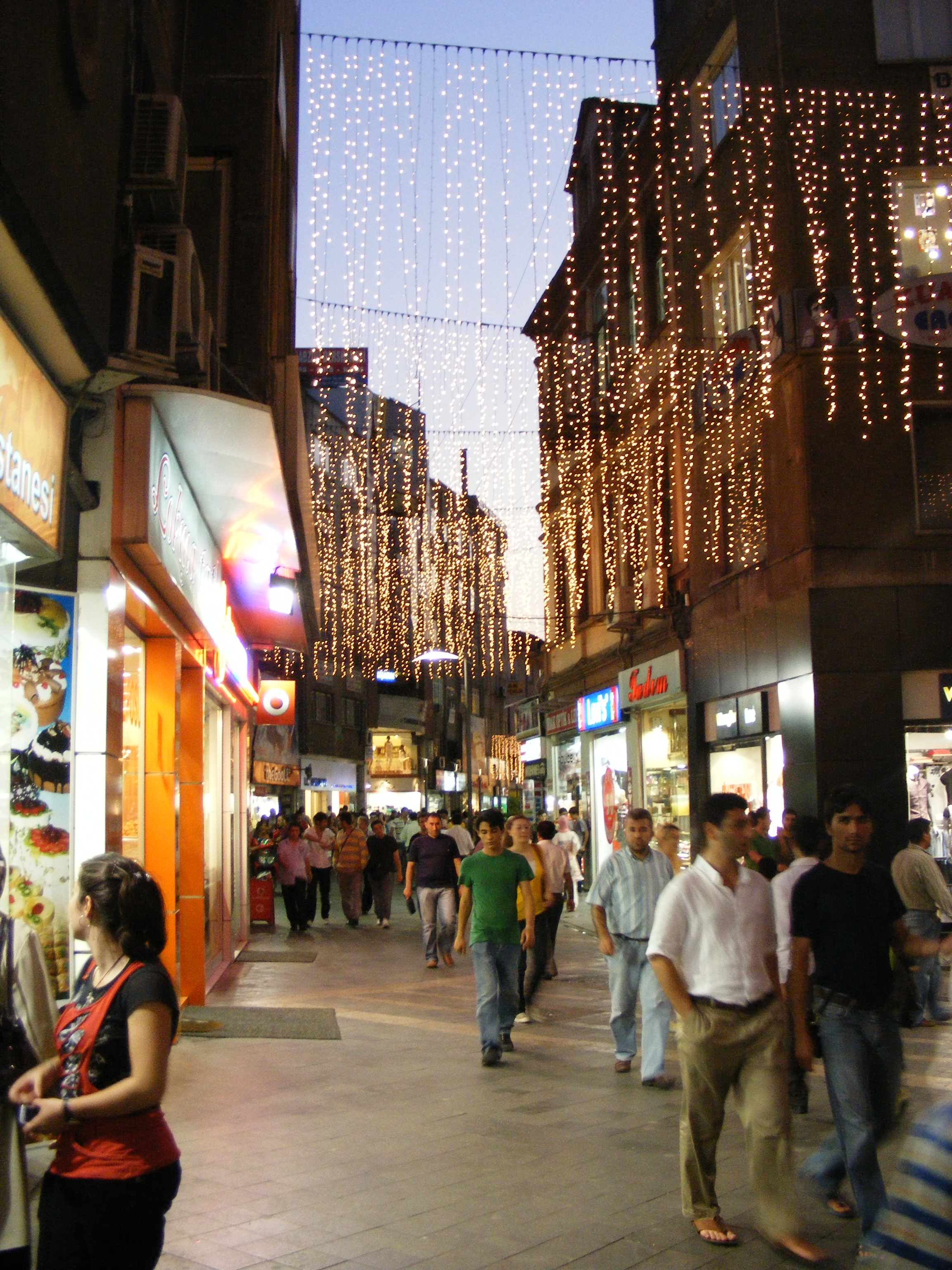
Uzun Sokak, a pedestrianized shopping street

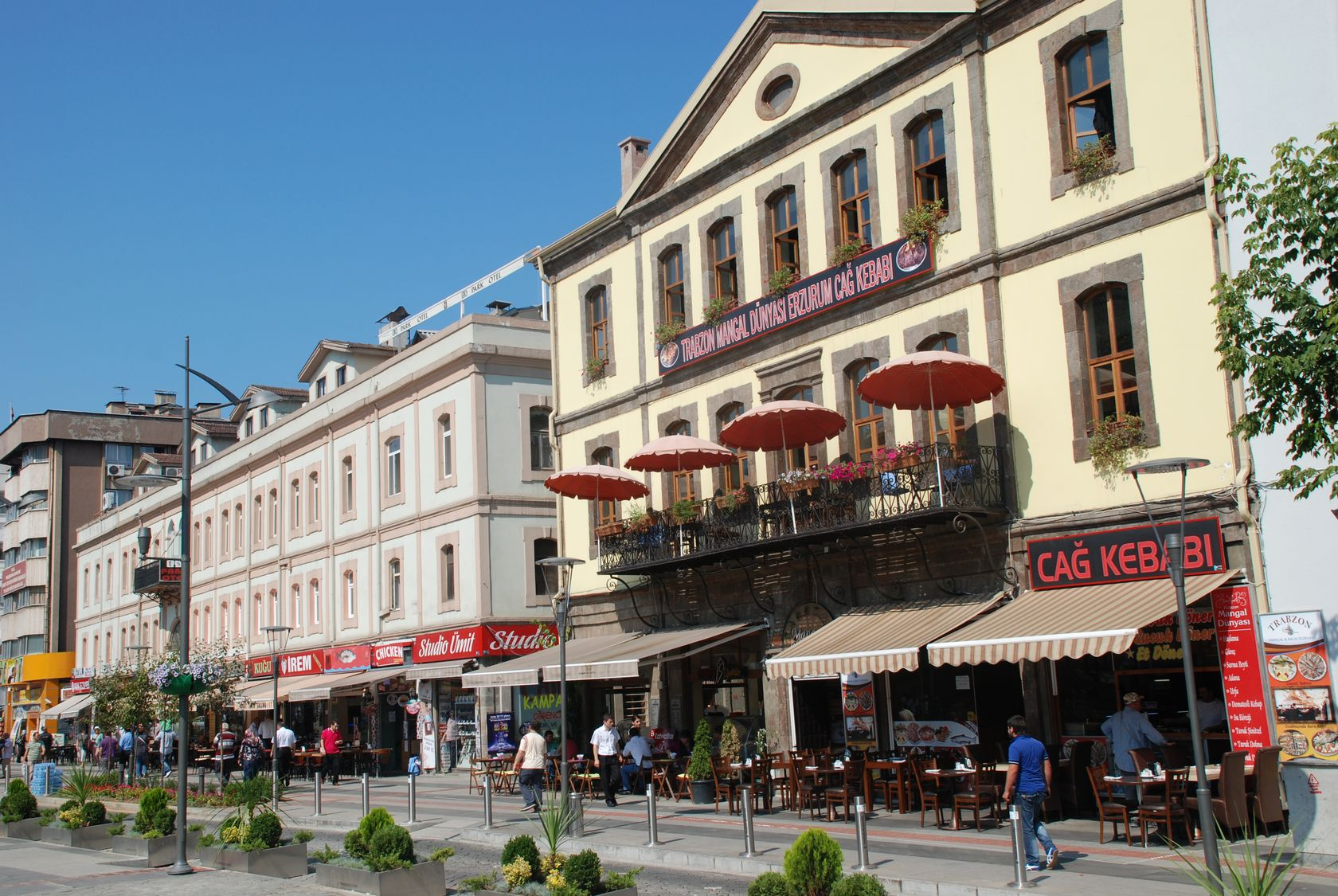
Atatürk Alani at Meydan square in Taksim (central Trabzon)

Topal Osman's men would eventually murder parliamentarian Şükrü for his criticism of the nationalist government of Mustafa Kemal in March 1923. Topal Osman was later sentenced to death and killed while resisting arrest. After pressure from the opposition, his headless body was hanged by his foot in front of the Turkish parliament. Ali Şükrü Bey, who had studied in Deniz Harp Okulu (Turkish Naval Academy) and worked as a journalist in the United Kingdom, is seen as a hero by the people of Trabzon, while in neighboring Giresun there is a statue of his murderer Topal Osman. Three years later, Trabzon deputy Hafız Mehmet – who had testified to his knowledge of, and opposition to, the Armenian Ggenocide – was also executed, for his alleged involvement in the İzmir plot to assassinate Mustafa Kemal. The literal decapitation of the Turkish political opposition – which was in large part based in the Trabzon region – decreased the city's national influence, and led to a long-standing animosity between the Kemalists and the population of Trabzon. A political and cultural divide between the Eastern Black Sea Region and the rest of Anatolia continued to exist throughout the 20th century, and still influences Turkish politics today. Even in the 21st century, politicians who hail from Trabzon are often faced with xenophobic attacks from both nationalist and conservative circles.

During World War II, shipping activity was limited because the Black Sea had again become a war zone. Hence, the most important export products, tobacco and hazelnuts, could not be sold and living standards degraded.

As a result of the general development of the country, Trabzon has developed its economic and commercial life. The coastal highway and a new harbour have increased commercial relations with central Anatolia, which has led to some growth. However, progress has been slow in comparison to the western and the southwestern parts of Turkey.

Trabzon is famous throughout Turkey for its anchovies called hamsi, which are the main meal in many restaurants in the city. Major exports from Trabzon include hazelnuts and tea.

The city still has a sizable community of Greek-speaking Muslims, most of whom are originally from the vicinities of Tonya, Sürmene and Çaykara. However, the variety of the Pontic Greek language - known as "Romeika" in the local vernacular, Pontiaka in Greek, and Rumca in Turkish - is spoken mostly by the older generations.

== Geography ==
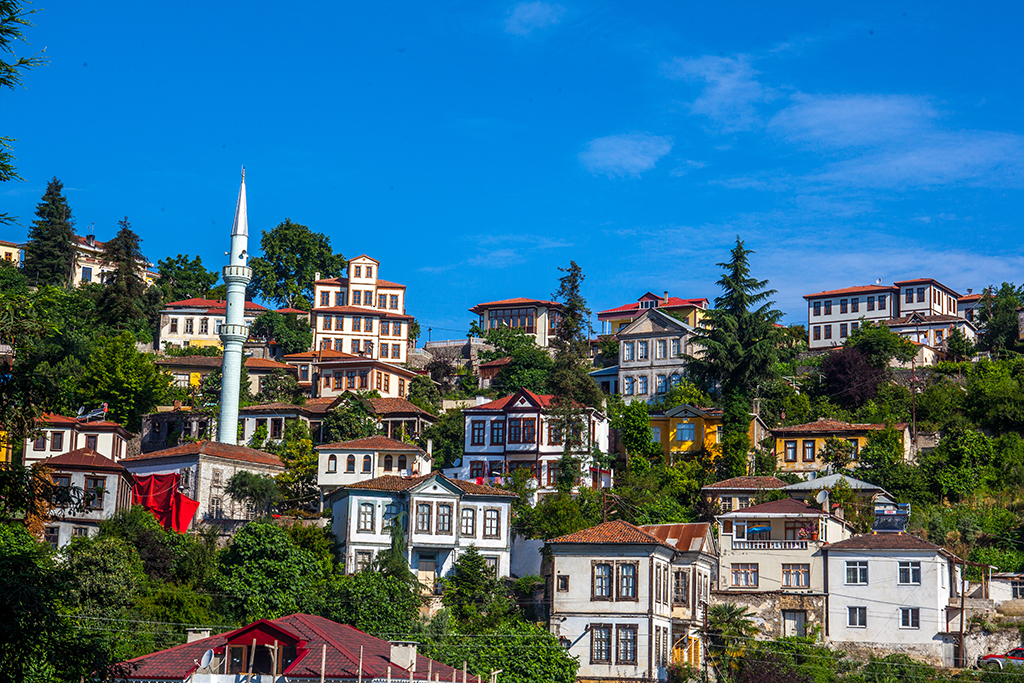
Historic mansions in Akçaabat (formerly Platana village)

Trabzon Province has a total area of 4,685 square kilometres (1,809 sq mi) and is bordered by the provinces of Rize, Giresun, and Gümüşhane. The total area is 22.4% plateau and 77.6% hills. The Pontic Mountains pass through the Trabzon Province.

Trabzon used to be an important reference point for navigators in the Black Sea during harsh weather conditions. The popular expression "perdere la Trebisonda" (losing Trebizond) is still commonly used in the Italian language to describe situations in which the sense of direction is lost. The Italian maritime republics such as Venice and in particular Genoa were active in the Black Sea trade for centuries.

Trabzon has four lakes: Uzungöl, Çakırgöl, Sera, and Haldizen Lakes. There are several streams, but no rivers in Trabzon.

=== Climate ===
Trabzon has a climate typical of the eastern Black Sea region, a humid subtropical climate (Köppen: Cfa, Trewartha: Cf) near the coast. A very small percentage of the province can be classified as subtropical, however, as slightly elevated rural areas near the coast are oceanic (Cfb/Do), the mountainous offshores are humid continental (Dfb/Dc) and subarctic (Dfc/Eo); and tundra (ET/Ft) can be found in the peaks of the Pontic Alps. Furthermore, during the time the Köppen climate classification was created, the city center had a borderline oceanic-humid subtropical climate, falling just under the 22 °C (72 °F) threshold for the hottest month of the year, yet climate change and the city's urban heat island contributed to its reclassification as humid subtropical in recent decades. This and the fact that the subtropical microclimate zone along the shore occupies a very narrow band due to the continuous parallel mountain range starting right at the coast is why local authorities still classify the city as oceanic, as this climate subtype is better representative of the entire coastal region of the province.

Summers are warm, the average maximum temperature is around 28 °C (82 °F) in August, while winters are generally cool, the lowest average minimum temperature is 4.6 °C (40.3 °F) in February. During winter, brief periods with foehn winds can cause temperatures to rise substantially, raising the seasonal average compared to the usual cold conditions. The humidity levels and cloud cover also decrease significantly during this period. Precipitation is heaviest in autumn and winter, with a marked reduction in the summer months, a microclimatic condition of the city center compared to the rest of the region. Snowfall is somewhat common between the months of December and March, snowing for a week or two, and it can be heavy once it snows (this is due to the "lake-effect snow"). The heaviest recorded snowfall in the city center was 115 cm (45.3 inches), recorded on 15 January 1950.

The water temperature, like in the rest of the Black Sea coast of Turkey, is generally mild, and fluctuates between 8 °C (46 °F) and 20 °C (68 °F) throughout the year.

Climate data for Trabzon (1991–2020, extremes 1927–2023)
Month	Jan	Feb	Mar	Apr	May	Jun	Jul	Aug	Sep	Oct	Nov	Dec	Year
Record high °C (°F)	27.0 (80.6)	30.1 (86.2)	35.2 (95.4)	37.6 (99.7)	38.2 (100.8)	36.7 (98.1)	37.0 (98.6)	38.2 (100.8)	37.9 (100.2)	33.8 (92.8)	32.8 (91.0)	26.4 (79.5)	38.2 (100.8)
Mean daily maximum °C (°F)	11.3 (52.3)	11.4 (52.5)	13.0 (55.4)	16.3 (61.3)	20.0 (68.0)	24.5 (76.1)	27.5 (81.5)	28.1 (82.6)	25.1 (77.2)	21.0 (69.8)	16.5 (61.7)	13.1 (55.6)	19.0 (66.2)
Daily mean °C (°F)	7.7 (45.9)	7.5 (45.5)	9.2 (48.6)	12.2 (54.0)	16.4 (61.5)	20.9 (69.6)	23.8 (74.8)	24.4 (75.9)	21.1 (70.0)	17.2 (63.0)	12.7 (54.9)	9.5 (49.1)	15.2 (59.4)
Mean daily minimum °C (°F)	5.0 (41.0)	4.6 (40.3)	6.2 (43.2)	9.0 (48.2)	13.4 (56.1)	17.6 (63.7)	20.6 (69.1)	21.2 (70.2)	17.8 (64.0)	14.1 (57.4)	9.6 (49.3)	6.8 (44.2)	12.2 (54.0)
Record low °C (°F)	−7.0 (19.4)	−7.4 (18.7)	−5.8 (21.6)	−2.0 (28.4)	4.2 (39.6)	9.2 (48.6)	11.0 (51.8)	13.5 (56.3)	7.3 (45.1)	3.4 (38.1)	−1.6 (29.1)	−3.3 (26.1)	−7.4 (18.7)
Average precipitation mm (inches)	88.8 (3.50)	63.1 (2.48)	69.3 (2.73)	62.8 (2.47)	55.5 (2.19)	52.3 (2.06)	34.7 (1.37)	59.4 (2.34)	85.4 (3.36)	134.1 (5.28)	103.2 (4.06)	93.5 (3.68)	902.1 (35.52)
Average precipitation days	13.32	11.91	14.18	14.09	13.32	11.73	7.86	9.91	11.09	13.36	11.68	13.05	145.5
Average relative humidity (%)	69	69	73	75	77	75	73	73	74	73	70	68	72
Mean monthly sunshine hours	71.3	84.8	99.2	135.0	170.5	192.0	176.7	151.9	147.0	127.1	105.0	65.1	1,525.6
Mean daily sunshine hours	2.3	3.0	3.2	4.5	5.5	6.4	5.7	4.9	4.9	4.1	3.5	2.1	4.2
Source 1: Turkish State Meteorological Service
Source 2: Weatherbase

== Economy ==
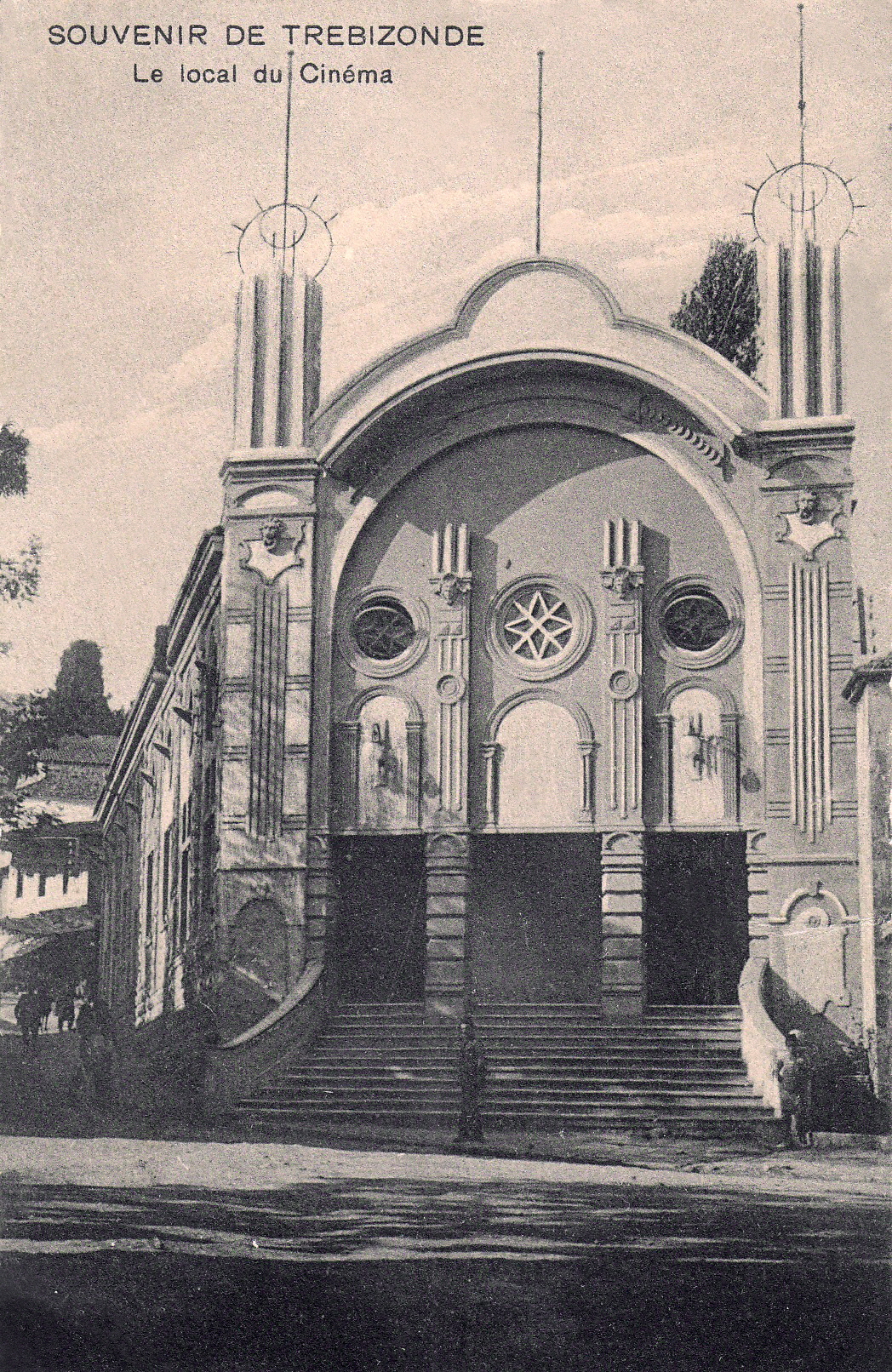
Postcard of the art nouveau style theatre/cinema in Trabzon

As of 1920, the port at Trabzon was considered "the most important of the Turkish Black Sea ports" by the British. It traded as far as Tabriz and Mosul. As of 1911, the Central Bank of the Republic of Turkey signed an agreement to develop a harbor at the port. When the Russians occupied Trabzon, a mole was built. They built a breakwater and were responsible for creating an extended pier, making loading and unloading easier. In 1920, Trabzon produced linen cloth, silver filagree, tanning and small amounts of cotton, silk and wool. Tobacco and hazelnuts were exported. The tobacco produced in Trabzon was called Trebizond-Platana. It was described as having "large leaves and a bright colour." Trabzon was known for producing poor quality cereals, mostly for local use.

Trabzon produced a white green bean, which was sold in Europe. It was, as of 1920, the only vegetable exported out of the province. Poultry farming was also popular in Trabzon. Sericulture was seen in the area before 1914. The area produced copper, silver, zinc, iron and manganese. Copper was kept for local use by coppersmiths. During the Balkan Wars production ceased due to poor exportation and fuel supplies.

Trabzon Airport opened in 1957.

== People ==
=== History ===
Trebizond was an overwhelmingly Christian and Greek city at the time of its fall to the Ottomans in 1461. The Greek Christians slowly lost their majority through the end of that century. Initially, the Muslims were mainly immigrants from Anatolia with a minority of local converts, but this quickly changed with the emergence of an active missionary spirit in the 16th century, as mosques and dervish lodges were built in predominantly Christian neighborhoods.

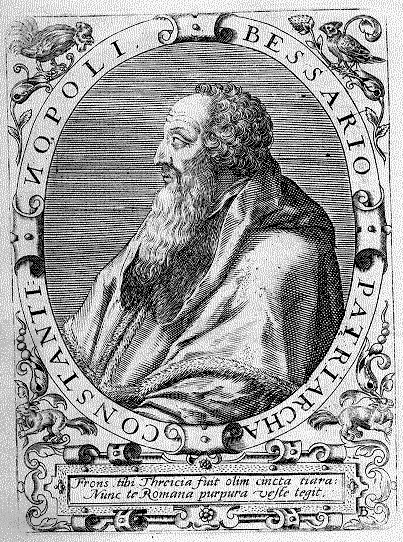
Bessarion was born in Trebizond on January 2, 1403. He was one of the illustrious Greek scholars who contributed to the Renaissance in Western Europe in the 15th century.

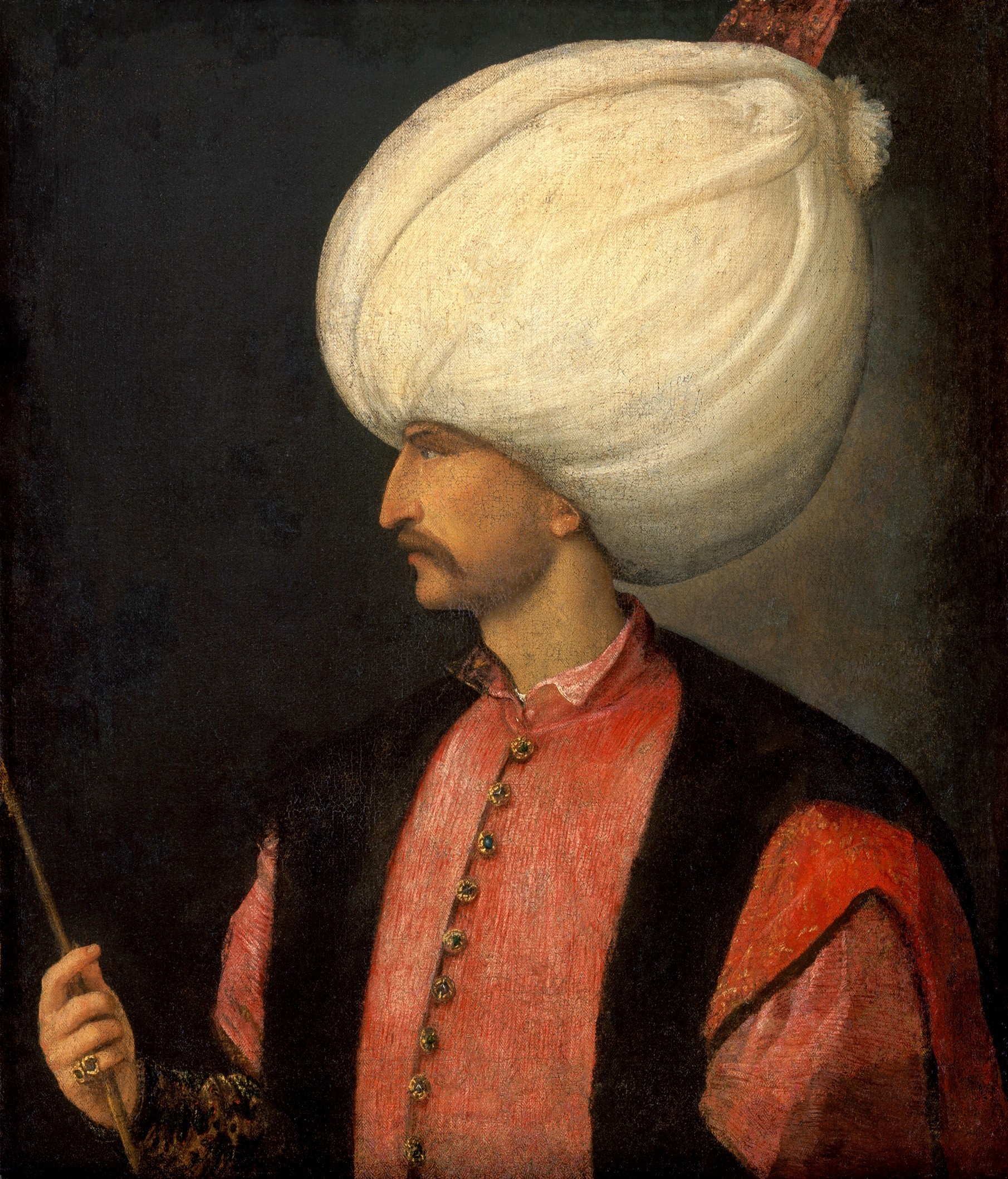
Suleiman the Magnificent was born in Trebizond on November 6, 1494. He vastly enlarged the territories of the Ottoman Empire, which became one of the world's leading superpowers in the 16th century, together with its arch-rival in the Mediterranean, the Spanish Empire. Portrait after Titian in the Kunsthistorisches Museum, Vienna.

Laz people also live in Trabzon. Numerous villages inside and out of Trabzon of the Laz date back as early as the period of Queen Tamar's rule (Georgian: თამარი, also transliterated as T'amar or Thamar; c. 1160 – 18 January 1213) in the newly unified Kingdom of Georgia. During the Queen's rule, sizeable groups of immigrating Georgians moved to Trabzon where they continue to preserve their native tongue. There was an Armenian community in Trebizond as early as the 7th century.

During the 13th and 14th centuries, numerous Armenian families migrated there from Ani. Robert W. Edwards published part of an early 15th-century diary from the Castilian ambassador who visited Trabzon and compared the churches of the Greek and Armenian communities. It was stated by the ambassador that the Armenians, who were not well-liked by the Greeks, had a population large enough to support a resident bishop. According to Ronald C. Jennings, in the early 16th century, Armenians made up approximately 13 percent of the city's population. At present, Trabzon does not have an Armenian-speaking community.

The Chepni people, a tribe of Oghuz Turks who played an important role in the history of the eastern Black Sea area in the 13th and 14th centuries, live in the Şalpazarı (Ağasar valley) region of the Trabzon Province. Very little has been written on the Turkification of the area. There are no historical records of any considerable Turkish-speaking groups in the Trabzon area until the late 15th century, with the exception of the Chepnis. The original Greek (and in some regions Armenian) speakers imposed features from their mother language into the Turkish spoken in the region. Heath W. Lowry's work with Halil İnalcık on Ottoman tax books (Tahrir Defteri) provides detailed demographic statistics for the city of Trabzon and its surrounding areas during the Ottoman period.

It is possible that the majority of the population of Trabzon and Rize (another ancient Greek colony in the Pontus region) — except up to the time of the Chepni Turk immigration waves — consisted of indigenous Caucasian tribes (the Colchians and the Laz) who had been partly Hellenized religiously and linguistically. Michael Meeker stresses the cultural resemblances (e.g. in village structure, house types, and pastoral techniques) between the Eastern Black Sea coast and the areas in the Caucasus proper.

=== Urbanization ===
Population	2007	2008	2009	2010	2011	2012	2013	2014	2015
Total	740,569	748,982	765,127	763,714	757,353	757,898	758,237	766,782	768,417
Urban	396,646	390,797	408,103	415,652	757,353	757,898	758,237	766,782	768,417

== Main sights ==
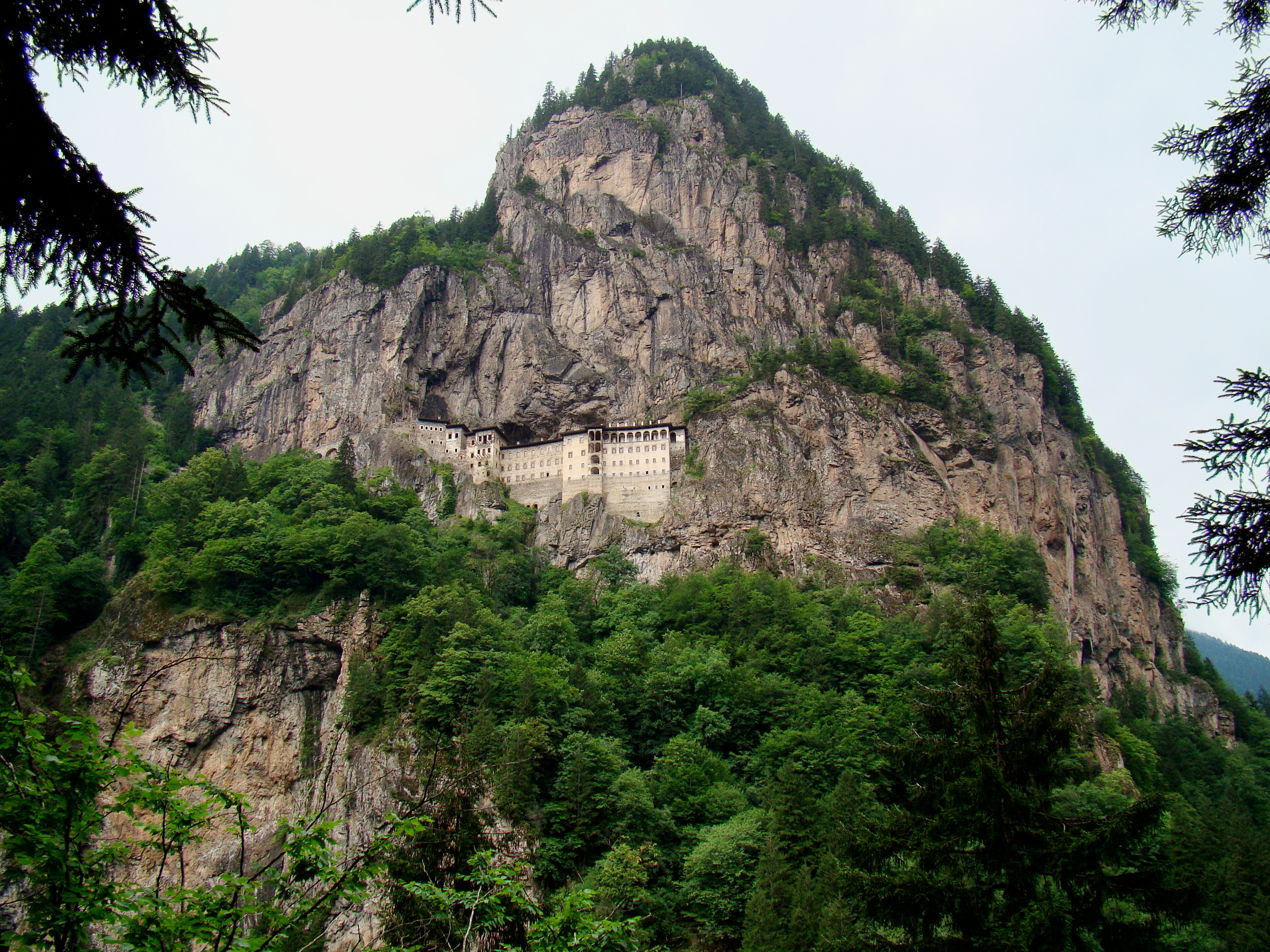
Sümela Monastery

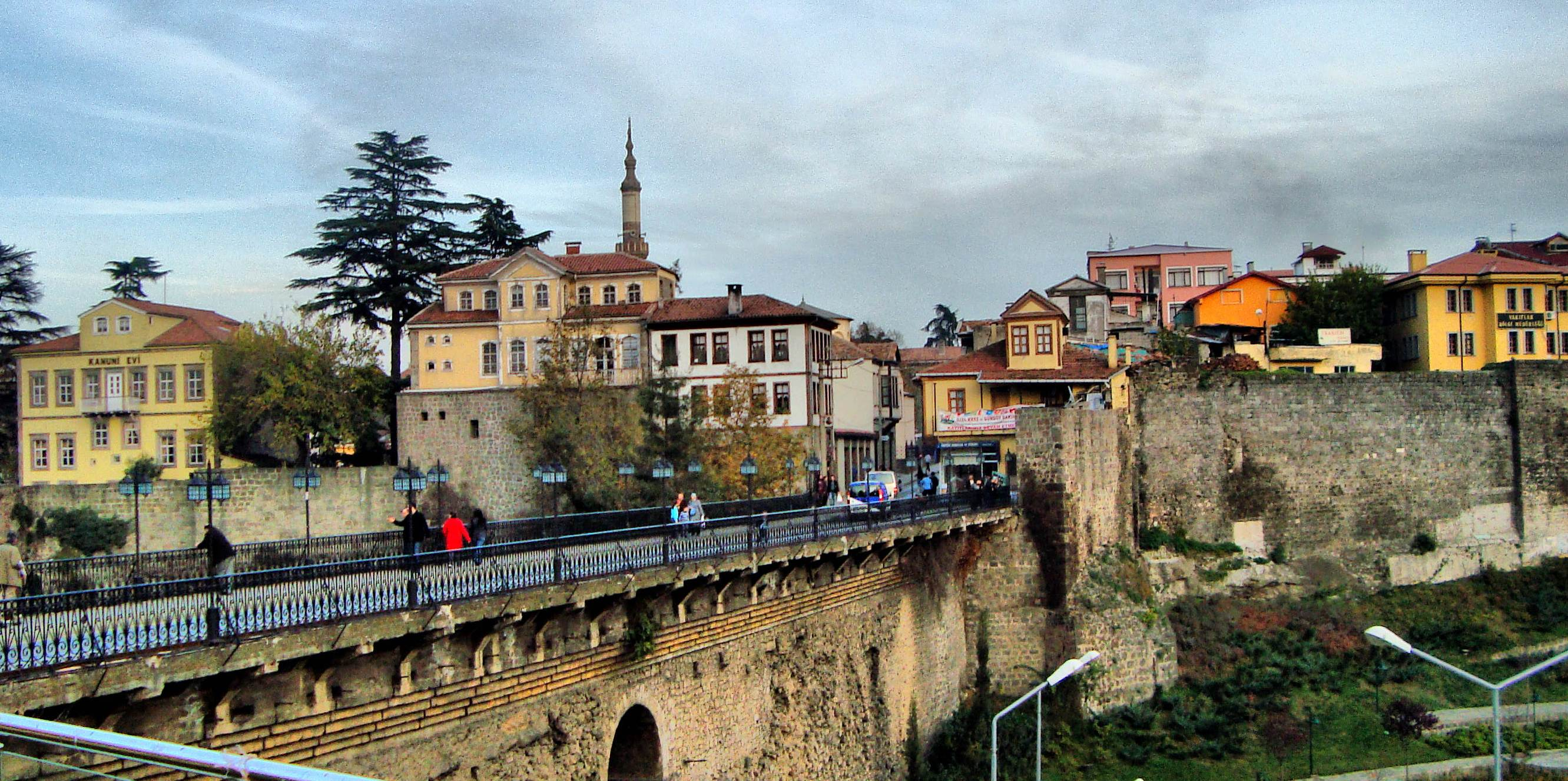
Zağnos bridge and central Ortahisar neighborhood

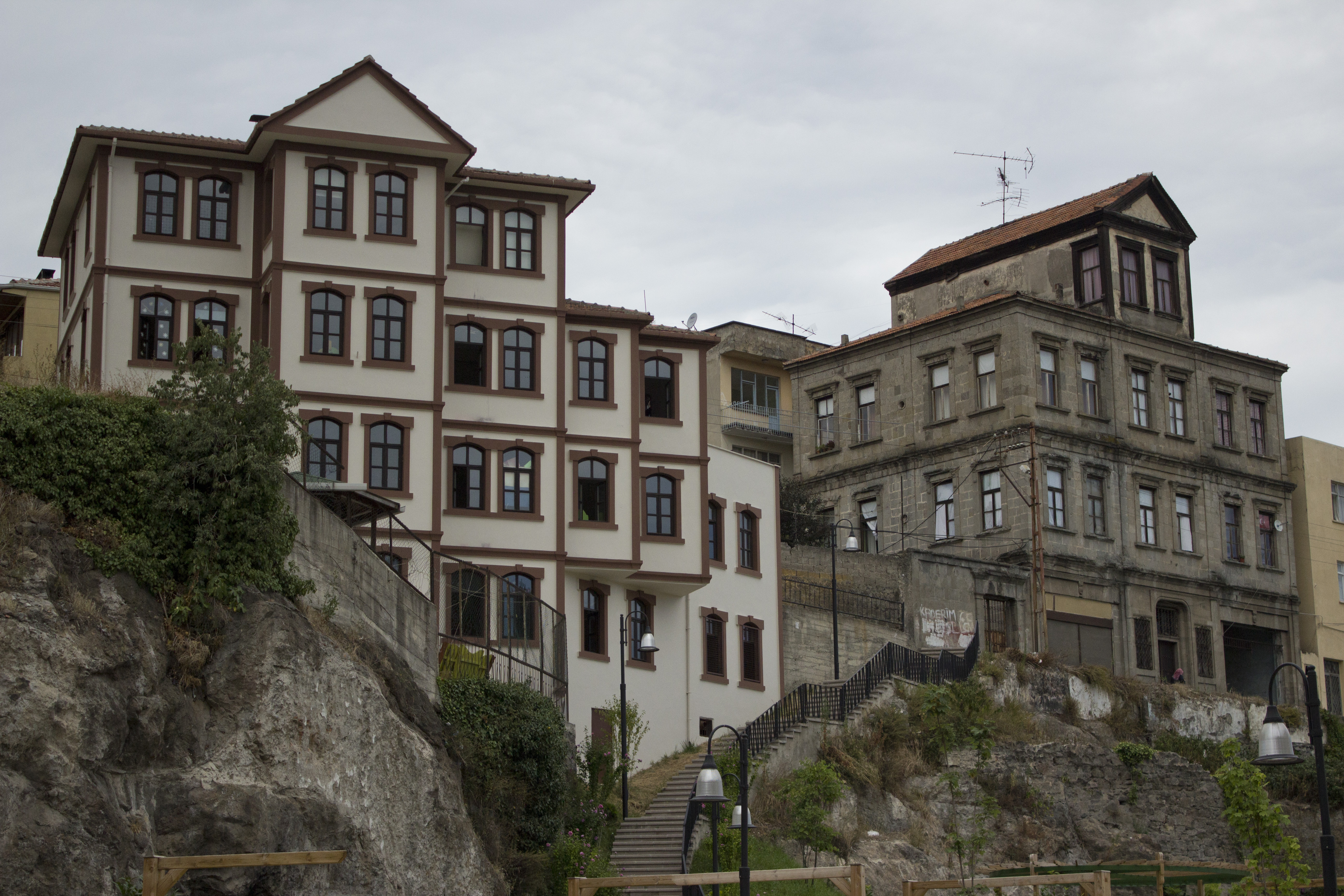
Vernacular architecture in masonry

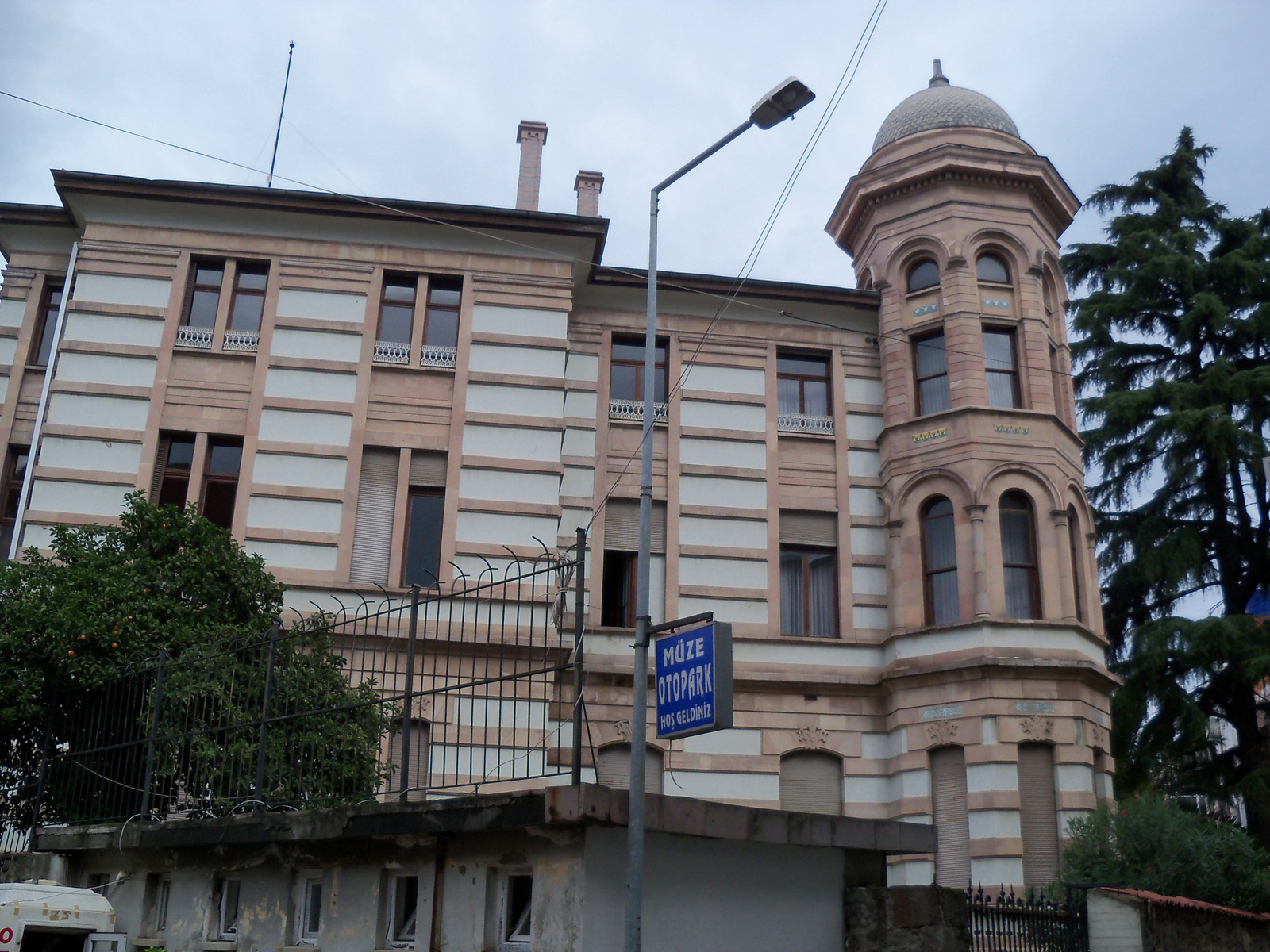
Trabzon Museum

Trabzon has a number of tourist attractions, some of them dating back to the times of the ancient empires that once existed in the region. In the city itself, one can find a hub of shops, stalls and restaurants surrounding the Meydan, a square in the center of the city, which includes a tea garden.

- The Hagia Sophia (formerly Turkish: Ayasofya Müzesi, now a mosque), a stunning Byzantine church, is probably the town's most important tourist attraction.
- Trabzon Castle ruins are visible in the town but cannot be visited as they fall in a military zone. The outside wall of the castle now serves as the back wall of a military building.
- The "Atatürk Köşkü" is a villa built in 1890 by a local Greek merchant. In 1924, Mustafa Kemal Atatürk stayed in the villa during his visit to Trabzon. He stayed there again in 1937. It houses period rooms and serves as a monument to the memory of the founder and first president of the Republic of Turkey.
- Boztepe Park is a small park and tea garden on the hills above Trabzon that has a panoramic view of nearly the entire city. The terrain in Trabzon is ascending in such a way that although the view is far above that of the buildings below, it is still close enough to be able to observe the flow of traffic and the people moving about in the city.
- Uzun Sokak is one of the most crowded streets of Trabzon.
- Trabzon Museum is located in the town centre and offers interesting exhibits on the history of the region, including an impressive collection of Byzantine artifacts.
- Trabzon's Bazaar District offers interesting shopping opportunities on ancient narrow streets, continuing from Kunduracılar Street from the Meydan (town square).
- Saint Anne Church, Trabzon, is located in the city centre of Trabzon, and one of the oldest in the city.
- Kostaki Mansion is located to the north of Zeytinlik, near Uzun Sokak.
- Uzungöl Dursun Ali İnan Museum An ethnographic museum in Uzungol that tells the history of Trabzon and the region.

Other sites of the city include: Fatih Mosque (originally the Panagia Khrysokephalos Church), Yeni Cuma Mosque (originally the Agios Eugenios Church), Nakip Mosque (originally the Agios Andreas Church), Hüsnü Köktuğ Mosque (originally the Agios Elevtherios Church), İskender Pasha Mosque, Semerciler Mosque, Çarşı Mosque, Gülbahar Hatun Mosque and Türbe (commissioned by Sultan Selim I), and Kalepark (originally Leonkastron).

Within Trabzon Province, the main attractions are the Sümela Monastery (i. e. the Monastery of the Panagia Soumelá) and the Uzungöl lake. The monastery is built on the side of a very steep mountain overlooking the green forests below and is about 50 kilometres (31 miles) south of the city. Uzungöl is known for its natural environment and scenery. Other sites of interest in the broader region include:

- Kaymaklı Monastery, a formerly Armenian Monastery of the All-Saviour (arm. Ամենափրկիչ Վանք, Amenaprgič Vank);
- Kızlar Monastery of Panagia Theoskepastos (the God-veiled Virgin);
- Kuştul Monastery of Gregorios Peristereotas (gr. Ιερά Μονή του Αγίου Γεωργίου Περιστερεώτα, Ierá Moní tou Agíou Georgíou Peristereóta);
- Vazelon Monastery of Agios Savvas (Maşatlık);
- Cave churches of Agia Anna (Little Ayvasıl), Sotha (St. John), Agios Theodoros, Agios Konstantinos, Agios Christophoros, Agia Kyriakí, Agios Michail, and Panagia Tzita churches.

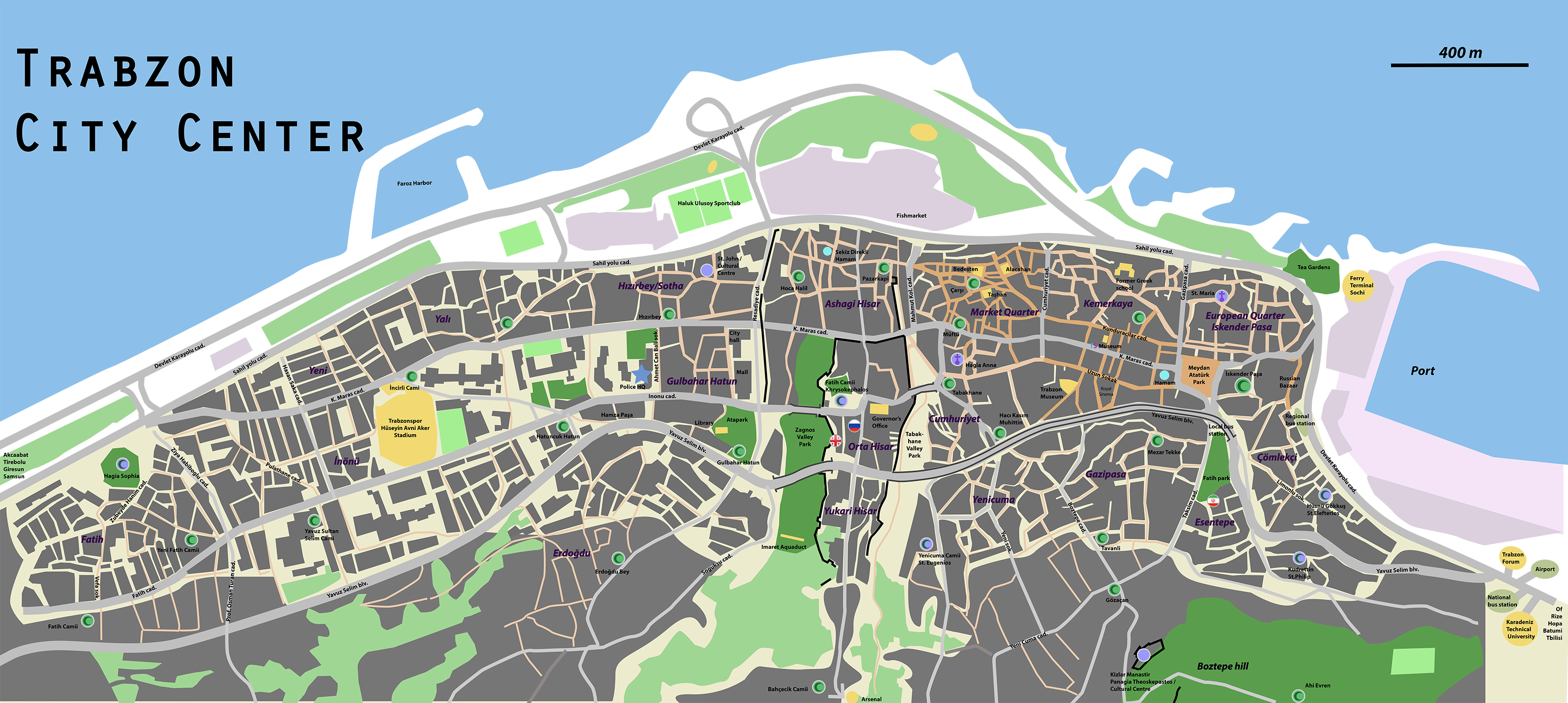

== Culture ==
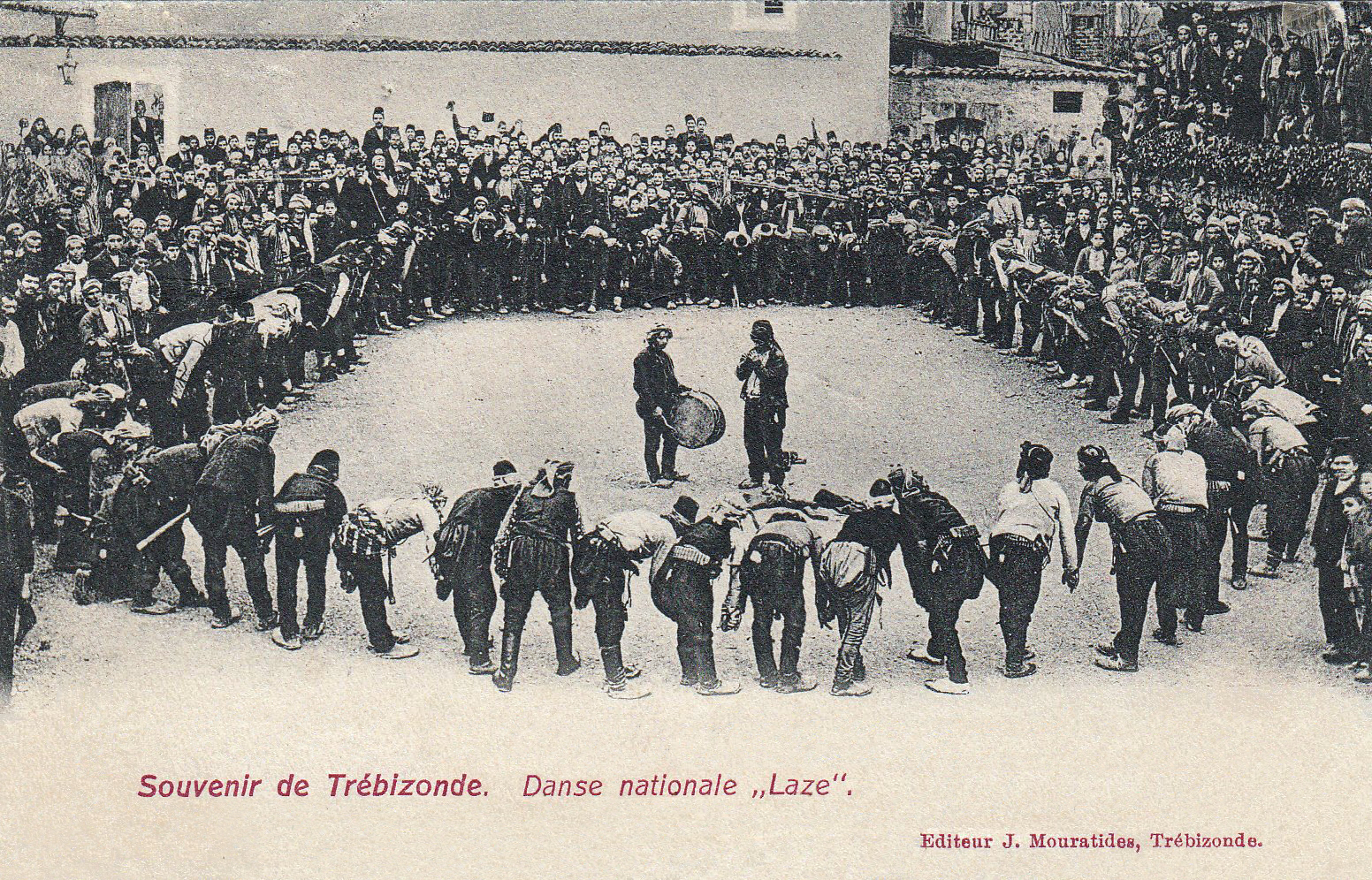
Postcard of Trabzon showing the national dance Horon

Folk dancing is still very much in evidence in the Black Sea Region. The "Horon" is a famous dance that is indigenous to the city and its surrounding area. It is performed by men, women, the young and elderly alike; in festivities, local weddings and harvest times. While similar to Russian Cossack dances in terms of vividness, the Trabzon folk dance is probably indigenous to the eastern Black Sea region, which has an impressive variety of folk music.

The people of Trabzon have a reputation for being religiously conservative and nationalist. Many Trabzonites generally show a strong sense of loyalty to their family, friends, religion and country. Atatürk selected his presidential guards from Trabzon and the neighbouring city of Giresun because of their fierce fighting ability and their loyalty.

Outside of the relatively urban space of Trabzon proper, and within parts of it as well, rural traditions from the Black Sea village life are still thriving. These include traditional gender roles, social conservatism, hospitality, and a willingness to help strangers; and all aspects, both positive and negative, of an agrarian lifestyle, such as hard work, poverty, strong family ties, and a closeness to nature.

The people of the eastern Black Sea region are also known for their wit and sense of humour; many jokes in Turkey are told about the natives of the Black Sea region Karadeniz fıkraları (Black Sea jokes). The character Temel, a universal buffoon figure found in many cultures, forms an important part of the Turkish oral tradition.

The city's profile was raised somewhat in the English-speaking world by Dame Rose Macaulay's last novel, The Towers of Trebizond (1956), which is still in print.

== Education ==
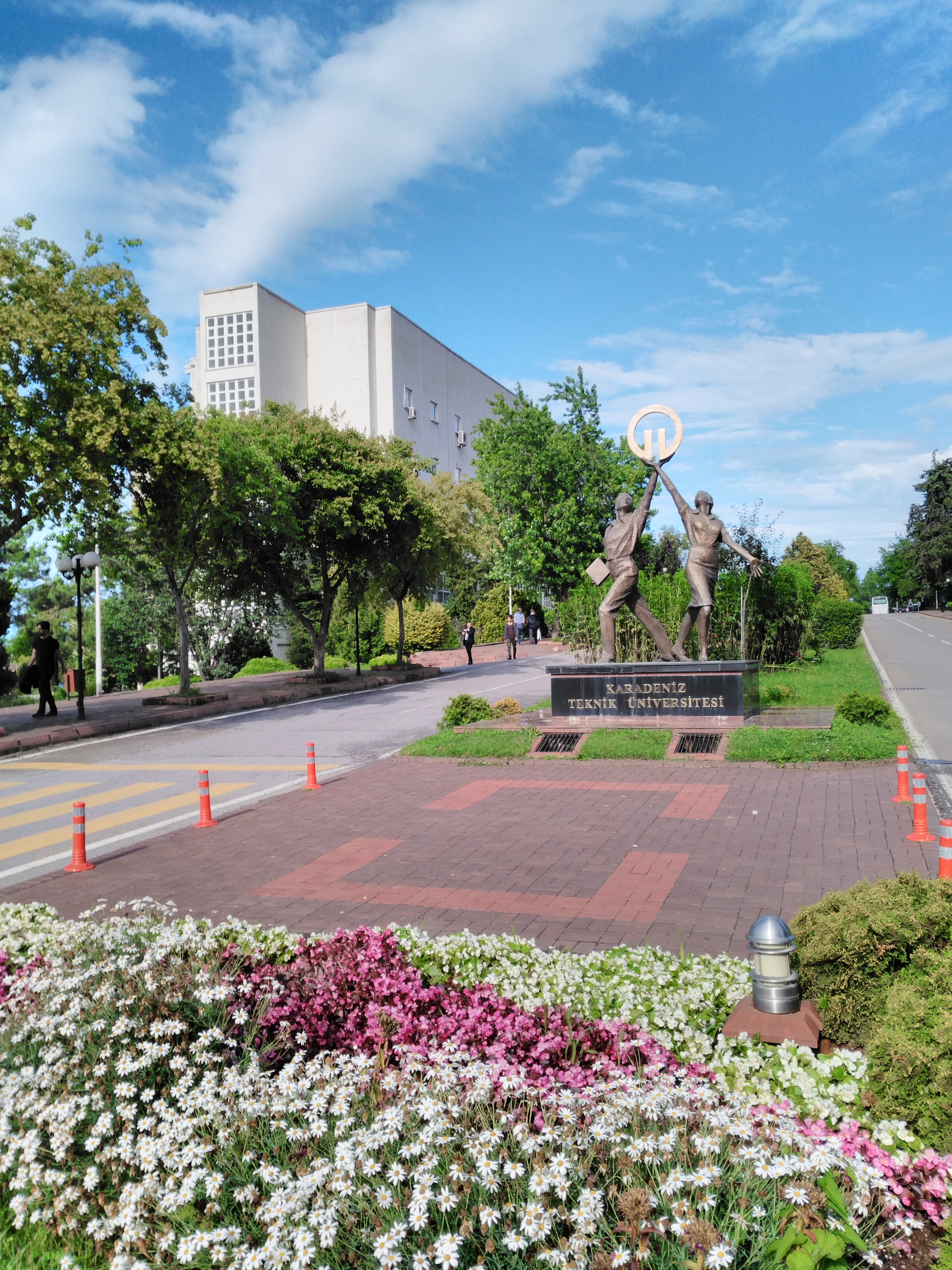
A view from the Karadeniz Technical University campus

Karadeniz Technical University in Trabzon hosts students from all over Turkey, especially from the Black Sea and East Anatolian regions, as well as students from the Turkic states in Central Asia.

Historically the city was a center of Greek culture and education and from 1683 to 1921, a teachers' college operated known as Phrontisterion of Trapezous, which provided a major impetus for the rapid expansion of Greek education throughout the region. The building of this institution (built in 1902) still remains the most impressive Pontic Greek monument in the city and today hosts the Turkish school Anadolu Lisesi.

== Cuisine ==
Trabzon's regional cuisine is traditionally reliant on fish, especially hamsi (fresh European Anchovy similar to the British Sprat or American Smelt). Trabzon meets 20% of the total fish production in Turkey. Regional dishes include the Akçaabat köfte (spicy lamb meatball from the Akçaabat district), Karadeniz pidesi (canoe shaped pita bread, often filled with ground beef, cheese and eggs), kuymak (a Turkish fondue made with cornmeal, fresh butter and cheese), Vakfıkebir ekmeği (large country-style bread), Tonya tereyağı (Tonya butter), tava mısır ekmeği (deep-dish corn bread) and kara lahana çorbası (bean and cabbage soup). Taflan kavurması is a cherry laurel dish served with onions and olive oil. Trabzon is also famous for its hazelnuts. The Black Sea region of Turkey is the world's largest producer of cherry and hazelnut; and a large production area of tea; all of which play an important role in the local cuisine.

== Sports ==
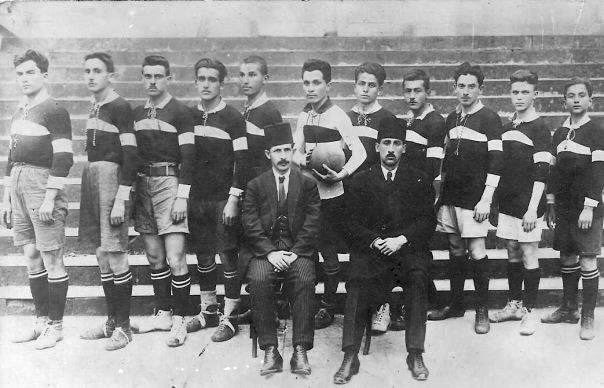
Photograph of a football team of Trabzonspor in 1920–1925

Football is the most popular sport in Trabzon. The city's top sports club, Trabzonspor, was until 2010 the only Turkish football club outside İstanbul to win the Süper Lig (six times), which was previously (until Trabzonspor's first championship title in the 1975–76 season) won only by the "Big Three" clubs of Istanbul, namely Galatasaray, Fenerbahçe, and Beşiktaş. Due to Trabzonspor's success, the decades-old term "Big Three" which defined the most successful football clubs in Turkey had to be modified into the "Big Four". Trabzonspor is also one of the most successful Turkish clubs in the European Cups, managing to beat numerous prominent teams such as Barcelona, Inter, Liverpool, Aston Villa, Monaco, and Lyon. Renowned former players of Trabzonspor include Şenol Güneş, Lars Olsen and Shota Arveladze. In the 2021–2022 season, Trabzonspor left their Istanbul competition far behind, securing an early championship and ending a 38-year dry streak. Hundreds of thousands Trabzonite expatriates and fans from around the globe made their way to the city to participate in one of the first mass gatherings in the country for nearly two years, marking the end of the Corona pandemic. Officially the pandemic-measures had not been fully lifted, which led to some criticism towards the city's municipal government for allowing the festivities to continue for hours into the night, long past curfew.

Trabzon hosted the first edition of the Black Sea Games in July 2007 and the 2011 European Youth Summer Olympic Festival.

Built in 2017, a two-lane Trabzon Curling Hall is situated under stadium of the Şenol Güneş Sports Complex.

== Mayors of Trabzon Metropolitan Municipality ==
- 1984-1989 Orhan Karakullukçu Anavatan Partisi
- 1989-1994 Atay Aktuğ SHP, CHP
- 1994-2002 Asım Aykan Refah Party, Fazilet Partisi, AK Party
- 2002-2004 Niyazi Sürmen AK Party
- 2004-2009 Volkan Canalioğlu CHP
- 2009-2019 Orhan Fevzi Gümrükçüoğlu AK Party
- 2019-2024 Murat Zorluoğlu AK Party
- 2024-present tr:Ahmet Metin Genç AK Party

== Twin towns and sister cities ==
Trabzon is twinned with:

- (Georgia (country)) Batumi, Georgia, since 2000
- Dortmund, Germany, since 2013
- Bishkek, Kyrgyzstan, since 2014
- Gabès, Tunisia, since 2013
- Rasht, Iran, since 2000
- Rizhao, China, since 1997
- Sochi, Russia, since 1993
- Szigetvár, Hungary, since 1998
- Zanjan, Iran, since 2001

== See also ==
- Amasya (ancient Amaseia, capital of the Pontic Greeks during classical antiquity)
- Anatolian Tigers
- Black Sea Region
- Kemençe of the Black Sea
- Kolbastı
- World Trade Center Trabzon
- Capture of Trabzon
