= John Lazaropoulos =

John Lazaropoulos (c.1310 - 1369) was the Metropolitan of Trebizond (as Joseph) from 1364 to November 1367 and a religious writer.

== Life ==
The first recorded event in John Lazaropoulos' life is a banquet at the Monastery of Saint Eugenios he attended, in celebration of the Transfiguration of Christ (6 August); amongst the guests was the protovestiarios Constantine Loukites, whom Lazaropoulos describes as "a great man in word and deed." He dates this banquet to the end of "my third age", and alludes to the fact both his parents were alive, which leads Jan Olof Rosenqvist to conclude Lazaropoulos was about 21 years old.

He was later made a sacristan (skeuophylax), married, and had two sons by 1340. Not long after the Emperor of Trebizond, Basil, died that same year, Lazaropoulos left Trebizond when Basil's wife Irene and her two sons were sent into exile at Constantinople. Lazaropoulos was accompanied by his son Constantine to Constantinople, where he arranged for his education. While in Constantinople his other son Theophanes died, and his wife joined them in the city.

When news had reached the Byzantine emperor John VI Kantakouzenos in 1349 that the Emperor of Trebizond Michael was both unpopular and (in the words of Lazaropoulos) "blunt and frivolous as well as old and childless", Kantakouzenos decided to intervene in Trapezuntine politics by sending the young John Komnenos (who would be crowned Alexios III Megas Komnenos) to Trebizond to replace Michael. The Byzantine emperor asked John Lazaropoulos to escort the boy and his entourage to Trebizond. They were to leave late in the year, when the weather on the Black Sea was known to be treacherous, and Lazaropoulos hesitated to sail until St. Eugenios appeared to him in a dream and assured Lazaropoulos he would have a safe journey. The party arrived in Trebizond 22 December.

On 27 October 1363, Niphon, the Metropolitan of Trebizond, was arrested for his complicity with an attempt on the life of Emperor Alexios not long before, and was confined to Soumela Monastery. When Niphon died on 18 March 1364, John was appointed his successor and proceeded to Constantinople for consecration by Patriarch Philotheos not long after Philotheos' enthronement on 8 October. John was back in Trebizond by Easter Sunday, 13 April 1365.

According to Michael Panaretos, John resigned his office on 15 November 1367, retiring to the monastery of Panagia Eleousa, close to the Daphnous harbor, next to Leonkastron; he was succeeded by a monk from Mount Athos, Theodosios of Thessalonica. The next year on 19 July he fled to Constantinople on account of piratical raids made on the Araniotai, which includes Ares Island (modern Giresun Island). William Miller considers these seaborne raids to be the acts of the Ottoman Turks, the future conquerors of Trebizond, although Anthony Bryer thinks that this raid "at this date is more likely to represent Sinopitan or local Turkmen corsairs."

== Writings ==
Lazaropoulos wrote two pieces on St. Eugenios of Trebizond: a Logos which covers the saint's life and death; and a Synopsis containing 33 miracles of the saint, which include two that involved Lazaropoulos but most notably the saint's reported participation in the 1224 siege of Trebizond. Both were edited by A. Papadopoulos-Kerameus, in his Fontes Historiae Imperii Trapezuntini, vol. 1. (No more volumes published.) They have been translated with facing Greek text in Jan Olof Rosenqvist, The Hagiographic Dossier of St Eugenios of Trebizond in Codex Athous Dionysiou 154 (Uppsala 1996).
