= Alexios III of Trebizond =

Emperor of Trebizond from 1349 to 1390

Alexios III Megas Komnenos
- Emperor and Autocrat of all the East, the Iberians and Perateia
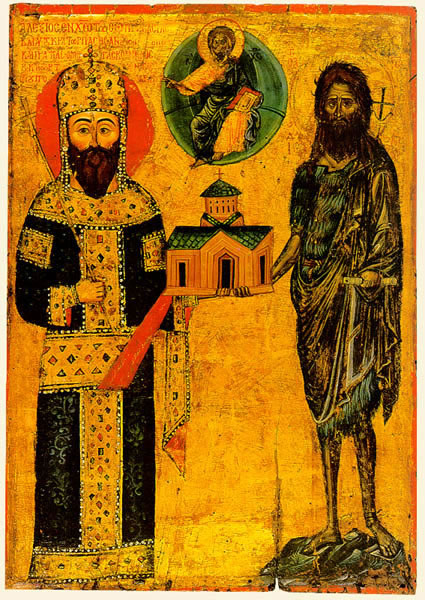
- Alexios III, Saint John the Baptist, and Christ Pantocrator from the chrysobull of the Dionysiou Monastery.

Emperor of Trebizond
- Reign: 22 December 1349 – 20 March 1390
- Predecessor: Michael
- Successor: Manuel III
- Born: 5 October 1338
- Died: 20 March 1390 (aged 51)
- Spouse: Theodora Kantakouzene
- Issue: Anna Megale Komnene; Basil Megas Komnenos; Manuel III Megas Komnenos; Eudokia Megale Komnene; Maria Megale Komnene; Two other daughters Andronikos (illegitimate)
- Dynasty: Komnenos
- Father: Basil Megas Komnenos
- Mother: Irene of Trebizond

Alexios III Megas Komnenos (Greek: Αλέξιος Μέγας Κομνηνός; 5 October 1338 – 20 March 1390), or Alexius III, was Emperor of Trebizond from December 1349 until his death. He is perhaps the best-documented ruler of that country, and his reign is distinguished by a number of religious grants and literary creations.

He was the son of Emperor Basil of Trebizond and his second (and bigamous) wife, Irene of Trebizond. Alexios III was originally named John (Ιωάννης, Iōannēs), and took the name Alexios either in memory of his older brother who had died prematurely or of his paternal grandfather, Emperor Alexios II of Trebizond.

His personal appearance was described by George Finlay as "extremely noble". Finlay contributes the following details: "He was florid, blonde, and regular-featured, with an aquiline nose, which, his flatterers often reminded him, was considered by Plato to be a royal feature. In person he was stout and well formed; in disposition he was gay and liberal; but his enemies reproached him with rashness, violence, and brutal passions."

== Early life and reign ==
When Basil died on April 6, 1340, and his first wife Irene Palaiologina succeeded him, she sent all the children of her dead husband to Constantinople together with their mother. Alexios was raised at the Byzantine court. When he was eleven years old, he was sent to Trebizond by Emperor John VI Kantakouzenos to replace his deposed great-uncle Michael, who had been an instrument of the regency Kantakouzenos had displaced. Alexios arrived in Trebizond on December 22, 1349, and was accepted as emperor by the nobility headed by megas doux Niketas Scholares without opposition. It was at this point that he adopted the name Alexios, and he was crowned on January 21, 1350, in the company of his mother Irene and of John Lazaropoulos. Alexios' position was safeguarded by confining the deposed Emperor Michael to a monastery.

In 1351 the connection to John VI Kantakouzenos was strengthened by further diplomatic initiatives. The deposed Emperor Michael was exiled to Constantinople, and on September 20, 1351, Alexios III married Theodora Kantakouzene, a relative of the Byzantine Emperor, in the newly rebuilt Church of St. Eugenios. For the time being, Alexios was accepted as emperor because of his youth and, to quote William Miller, "not calculated to bring peace to the state, distracted for the previous decade by the jealousies and ambitions of rival gangs of noble place-hunters". While the aristocrats squabbled with each other, Alexios despaired of security in his capital and retired to the coastal castle of Tripolis.

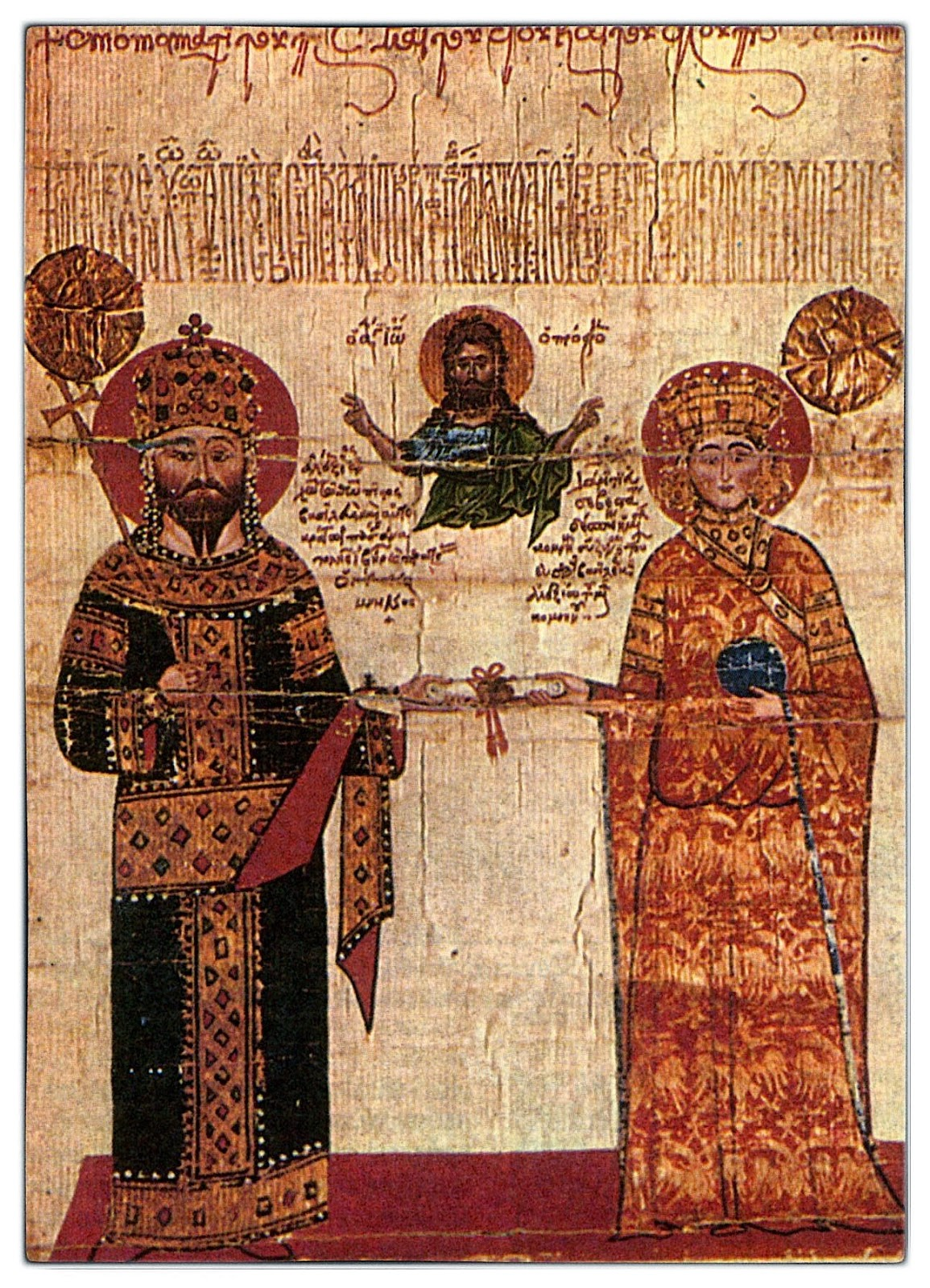
Alexios III with his wife Theodora, from the chrysobull he granted to the Dionysiou monastery.

The young emperor was supported by his mother and some loyal generals and courtiers, including Michael Panaretos, whose laconic chronicle is the principal source on the political history of the Empire of Trebizond. With them he subdued insubordinate nobles one by one. Alexios and his court further strengthened their position by fostering peaceful relations with the Turkmen with marriage alliances such as that between the emperor's oldest sister Maria and Fahreddin Kutlubeg of Aq Qoyunlu in 1352.

As Alexios' position improved, he relied less on the kingmaker Niketas. By June 1354 the megas doux was forced to flee to Kerasous, where he prepared a fleet consisting of one galley and eleven smaller vessels that sailed against Trebizond in March 1355. The rebels realized that they would be unable to win and abandoned their expedition. Alexios fitted out his own fleet of galleys and several smaller crafts, and in May sailed to Kerasous with the company of his mother and the Metropolitan of Trebizond, and conquered the town in the absence of Niketas. The emperor's cavalry besieged the last fortress loyal to the megas doux, Kenchrina, and obtained its surrender. Niketas and his aristocratic supporters were taken captive and brought to Trebizond, where he died in 1360.

With the imprisonment of Niketas, Michael Panaretos' leaves off writing of the civil war. Most writers conclude this means the civil war itself ended, but an attempt by the Kabasites and other nobles to assassinate Alexios III in 1363 may be part of that conflict. Alexios escaped their ambush and later, with the help of loyal soldiers, arrested all of them. The Metropolitan Niphon was deposed for his complicity in the plot and died confined in a monastery the following year. He was replaced with the emperor's supporter John Lazaropoulos, who became Metropolitan of Trebizond under the monastic name Joseph. In spite of his victories over the nobles, Alexios showed restraint and willingness to compromise by granting charters to noble families confirming them in possession of their lands.

== External affairs ==
Alexios III began dealing with strengthening the frontier against the Turkmen before the end of the civil unrest. In this he was less successful, and suffered a major defeat in battle in 1355. Alexios and Panaretos barely escaped with their lives. A raid on Matzouka by Hajji Amir, the emir of Chalybia, was neutralized by diplomacy, and he was married to Alexios' sister Theodora in 1358. Alexios continued this policy of seeking diplomatic alliances with the neighboring Muslim princes, with the marriages of four of his daughters; the fifth, Anna Megale Komnene, became the second wife of King Bagrat V of Georgia.

Alexios was also unable to displace the Genoese and Venetians from their dominant position in Trebizond's commerce. The position of Venice had declined following the concession of Leonkastron to the Genoese in 1349, and in 1360 Alexios attempted to restore commercial relations with Venice to offset the power of the Genoese. In 1364 he confirmed to the Venetians their old privileges and assigned them a depot "below the monastery of the holy martyr, Theodore Gabras". But the Venetians were not content with their gains and jealously quarreled with the Genoese. Another concession to Venice followed in 1367, which gradually lowered some of the dues levied on Venetian commerce.

Nevertheless, Alexios' attempt to exploit the commerce of the Italian republics resulted in considerable resentment. In 1373 the Venetians conspired with the despotes Dobrotitsa of Dobruja (an enemy of the Genoese) to impose his son-in-law Michael Palaiologos, a younger son of Emperor John V Palaiologos, upon the throne of Trebizond. Michael Palaiologos appeared before Trebizond with two large ships and a small one, and remained there for five days until he abandoned the plan and left. Relations with Venice were patched up, but although Alexios further reduced the dues he collected from the Venetians in 1381, their trade with Trebizond continued to decline.

Alexios III died on March 20, 1390, and was succeeded by his son Manuel III. During his long reign, Alexios III had repaired the physical damage to the capital, gave rich endowments to several monasteries, especially Soumela Monastery, and founded the Dionysiou monastery at Mount Athos. Anthony Bryer explains this largesse was due to a series of confiscations following the defeat of the nobles who had opposed a strong central government, setting forth a timeline showing how as archontes were executed and their properties reverted to the crown, he could refound monasteries such as St. Phokas in Kordyle (1362), Soumela (1364), Dionysiou (1374), and Theoskepastos (1376). "This sequence of recovery, or expansion, of the imperial demesne, which is the clue to Alexios III's triumph over his landowning rivals, is clear enough."

== Issue ==
By his wife Theodora Kantakouzene, Alexios III had seven children:

- Anna (1357 – after 1406), who married King Bagrat V of Georgia
- Basil (1358–1377)
- Manuel III (1364–1417), Emperor 1390–1416. Married Gulkhan-Eudokia of Georgia.
- Eudokia, who married Tajeddin, Emir of Limnia on 8 October 1379
- Maria, who married Suleiman Beg, Emir of Chalybia
- An unnamed daughter, who married Mutahharten, Emir of Erzincan
- A second unnamed daughter, who married Qara Osman, chieftain of the Aq Qoyunlu

By an unnamed mistress, Alexios also had at least one illegitimate son:

- Andronikos (1355–1376), who married Gulkhan-Eudokia, daughter of King David IX of Georgia, but died from a fall not long after and Eudokia married his brother, Manuel III

== Other sources ==
- The Oxford Dictionary of Byzantium, Oxford University Press, 1991.

Alexios III of Trebizond Komnenid dynasty Born: 5 October 1338 Died: 20 March 1390
Regnal titles
Preceded by Michael	Emperor of Trebizond; 1349–1390	Succeeded by Manuel III
