= Panagia Theoskepastos Monastery =

Greek Orthodox monastery near Trabzon, Turkey

Coordinates: 40.9985°N 39.7290°E

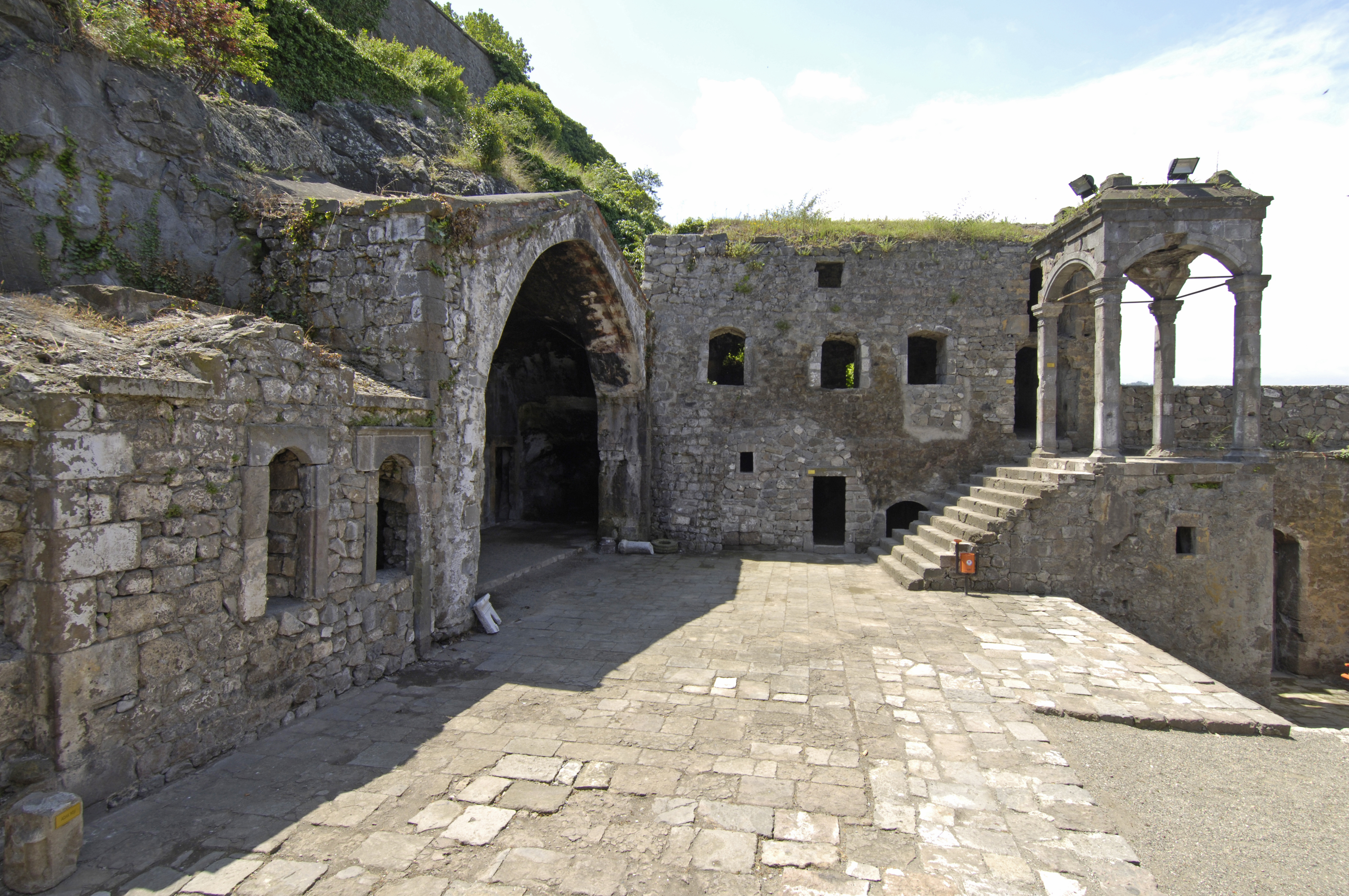
- Panagia Theoskepastos Monastery also known as Kızlar Manastırı.

- Location within Turkey

Religion
- Affiliation: Greek Orthodox Church
- Rite: Byzantine rite
- Status: In ruins

Location
- Location: Trebizond, Turkey

Architecture
- Type: Monastery

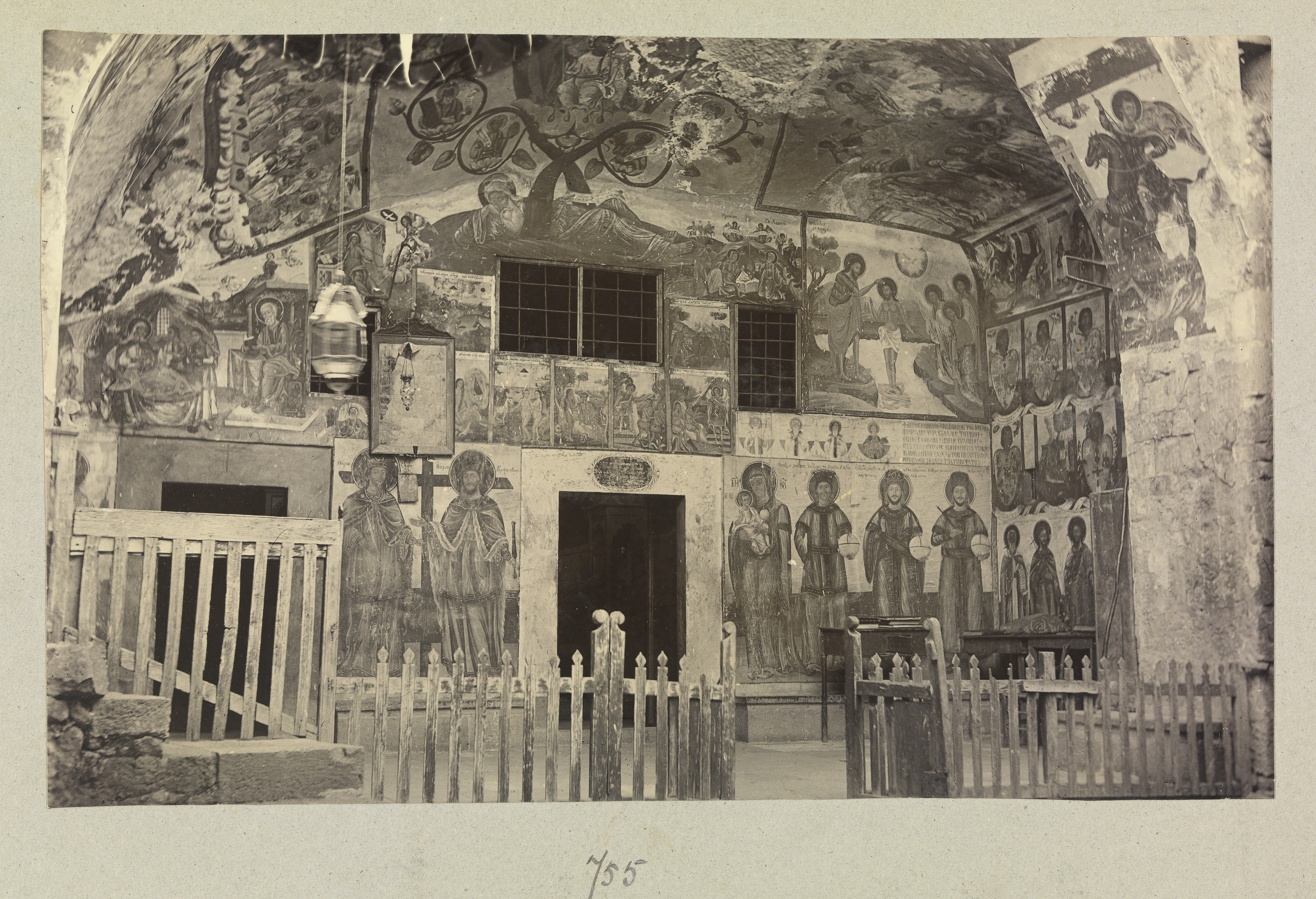
19th century photograph of the original murals in front of the cave church before it was repainted a few years later. The current facade of this part of the cave church has been completely distinctly rebuilt.

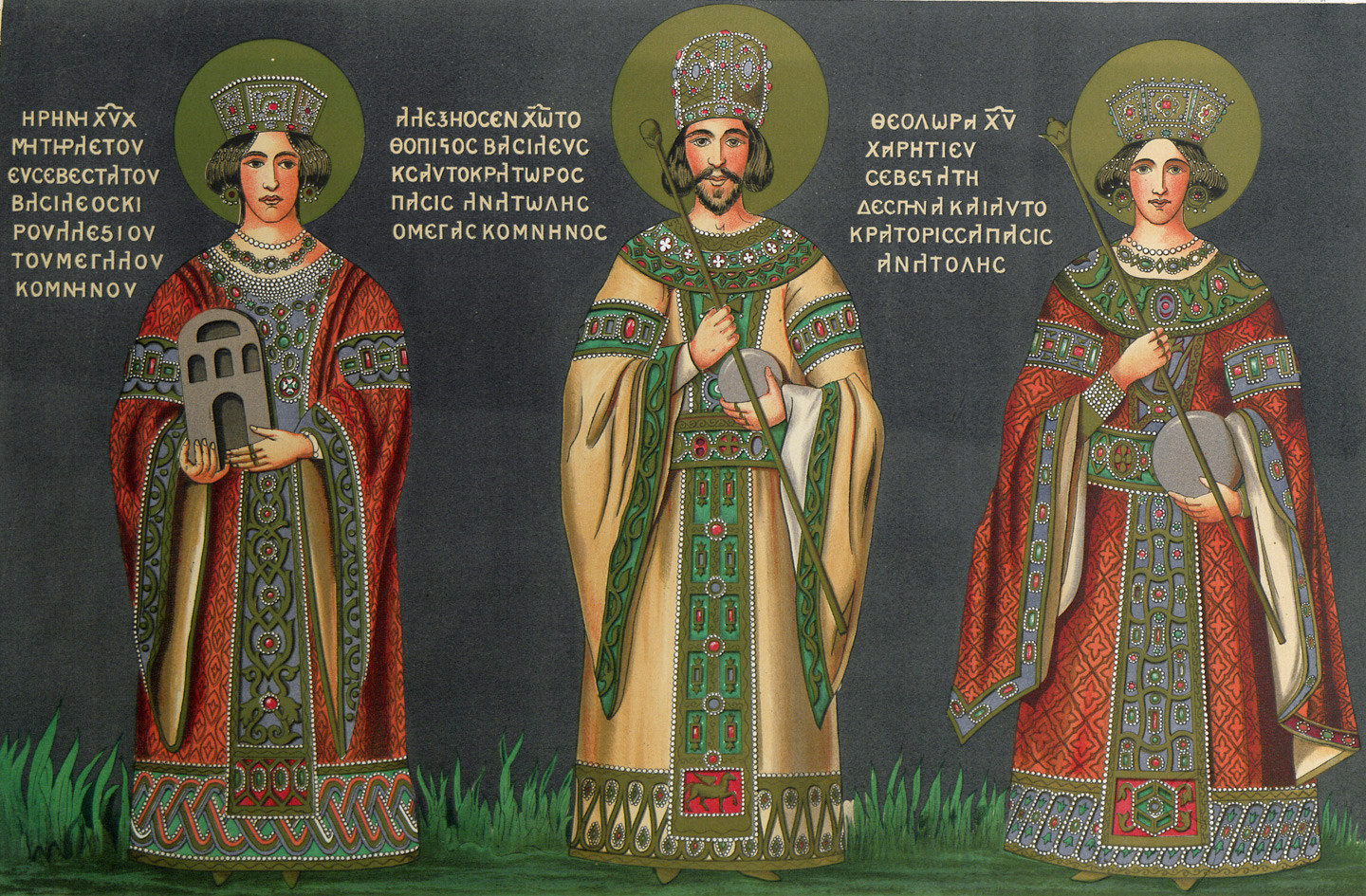
Fresco of Alexios III between his mother and wife, from the monastery

The Panagia Theoskepastos Monastery (Greek: Παναγία Θεοσκέπαστος, "Panagia the God-guarded"), today known in Turkish as Kızlar Monastery, is a former female monastery built during the Empire of Trebizond.

It lies at the foot of Boztepe mountain overlooking the city of Trabzon. The monastery complex built on two terraces, is surrounded by a protective high wall. The monastery was founded in the reign of Alexios III (1349–1390). Having undergone major repairs several times it assumed its present form in the 19th century. The monastery initially comprised the rock church on the south side the chapel in its entrance and a few cells. Inside the rock church there are inscriptions and portraits of Alexios III, his wife Theodora and his mother Irene.

== Gallery ==
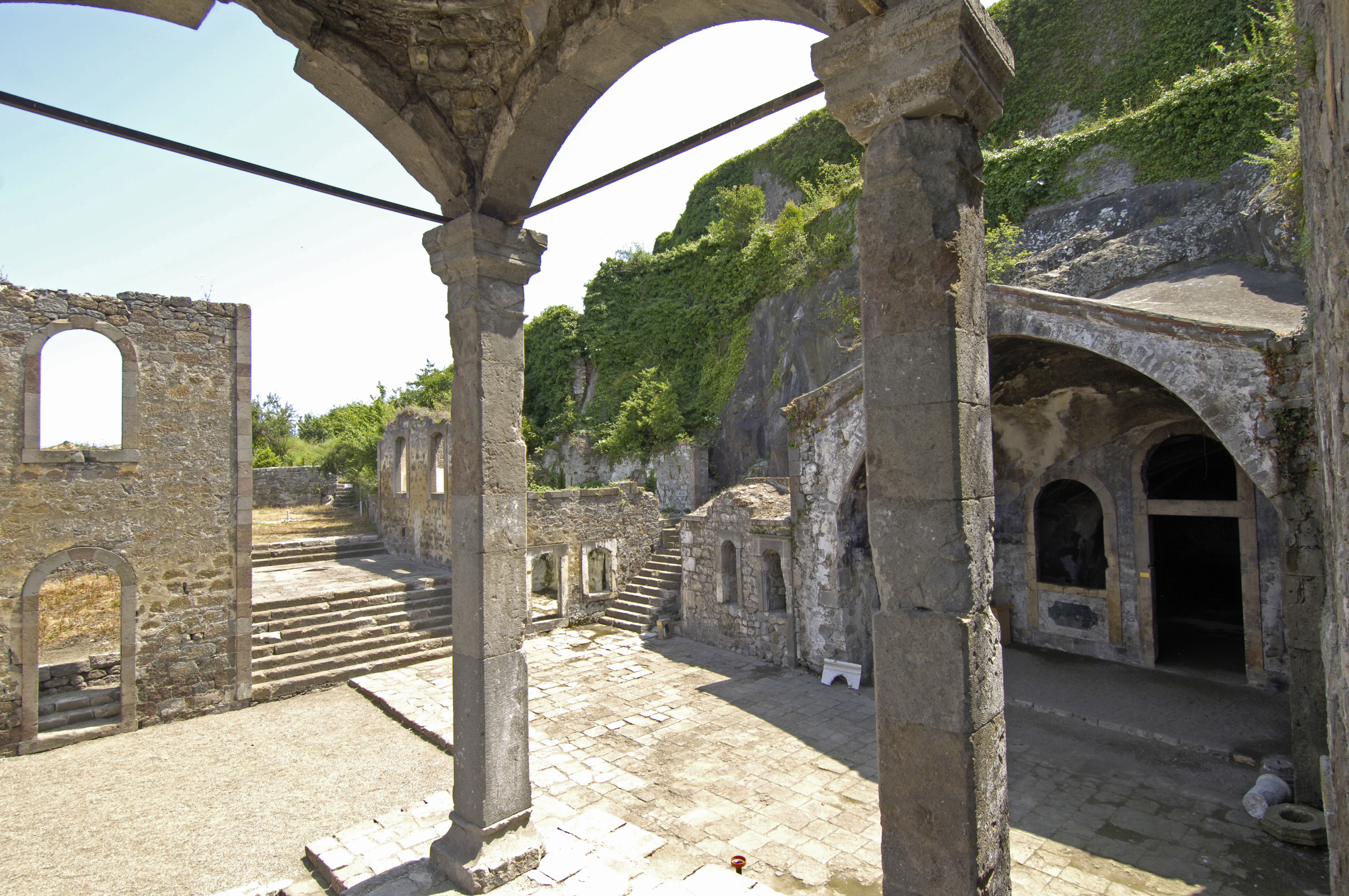
Panagia Theoskepastos Monastery aka Kızlar Manastırı

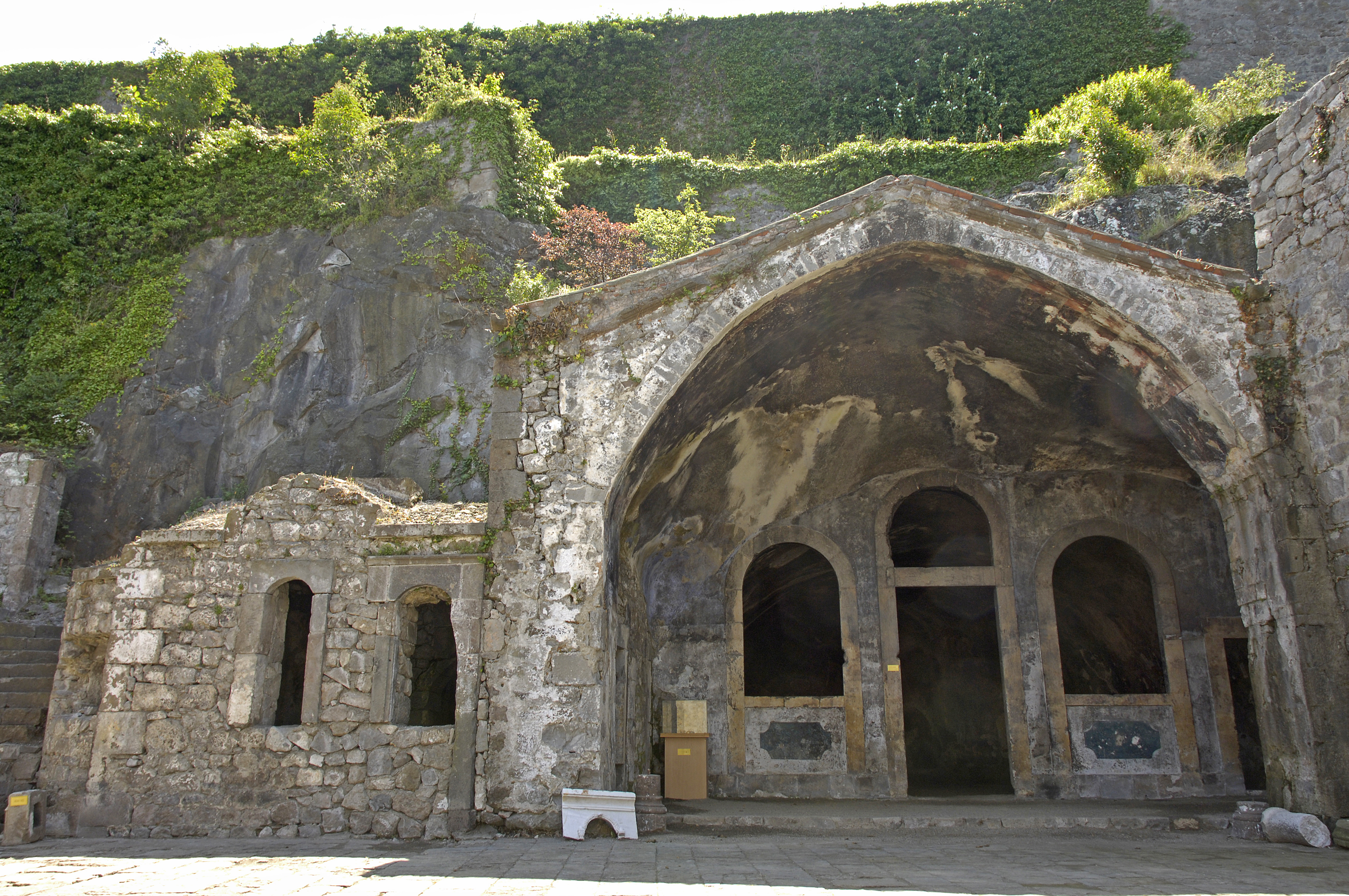
Panagia Theoskepastos Monastery aka Kızlar Manastırı

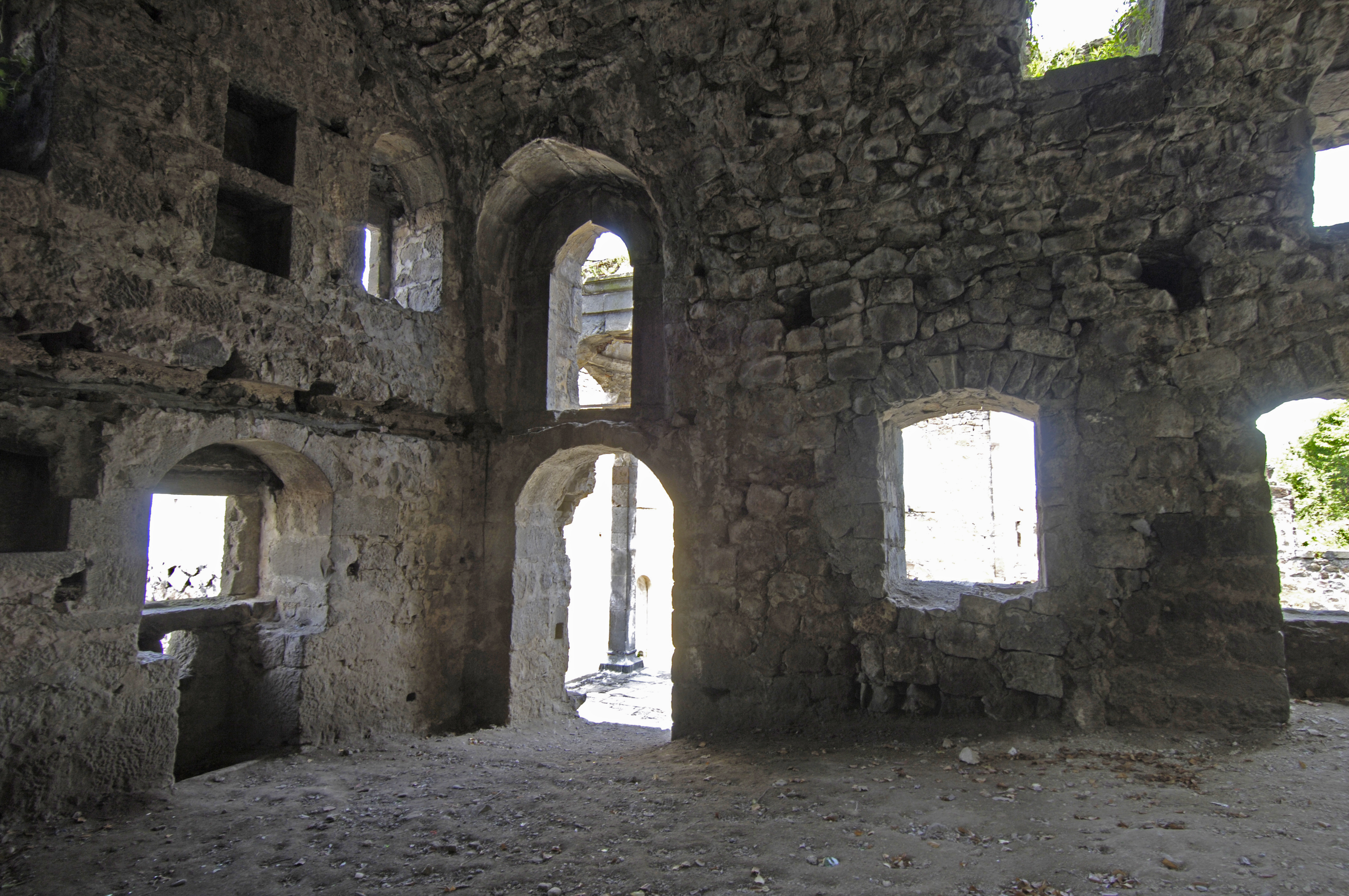
Panagia Theoskepastos Monastery aka Kızlar Manastırı

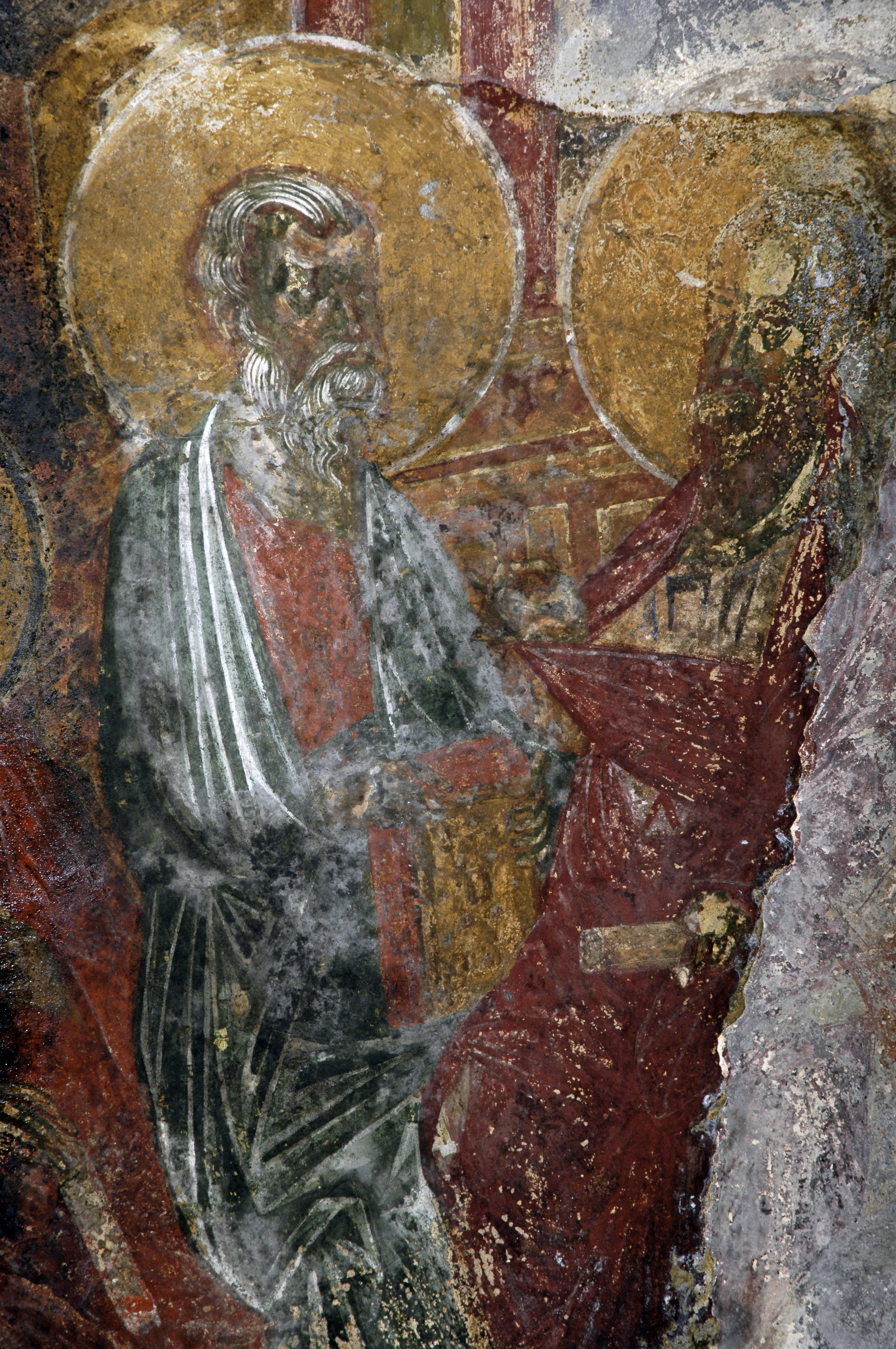
Panagia Theoskepastos Monastery aka Kızlar Manastırı Fresco

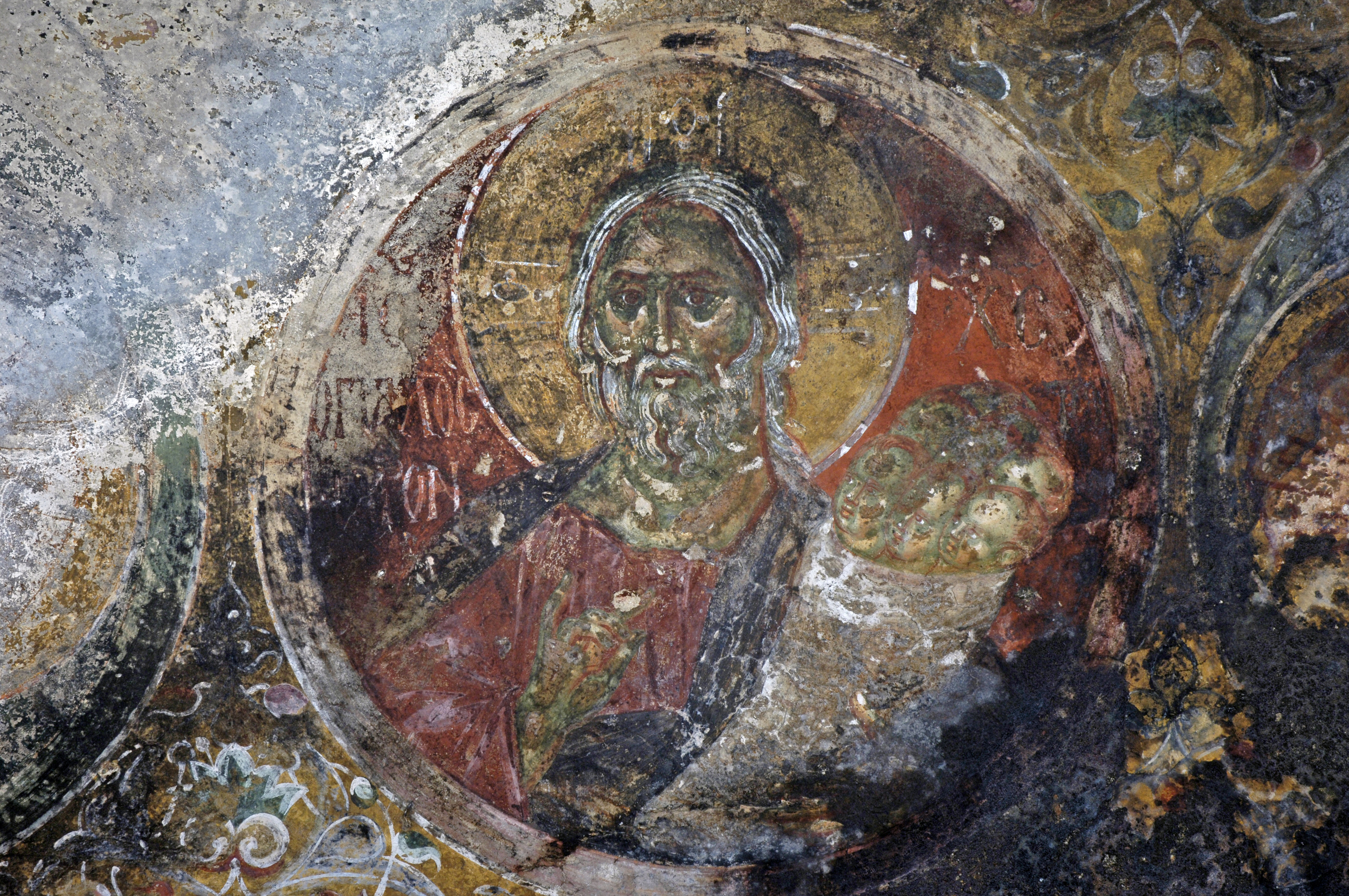
Panagia Theoskepastos Monastery aka Kızlar Manastırı Fresco

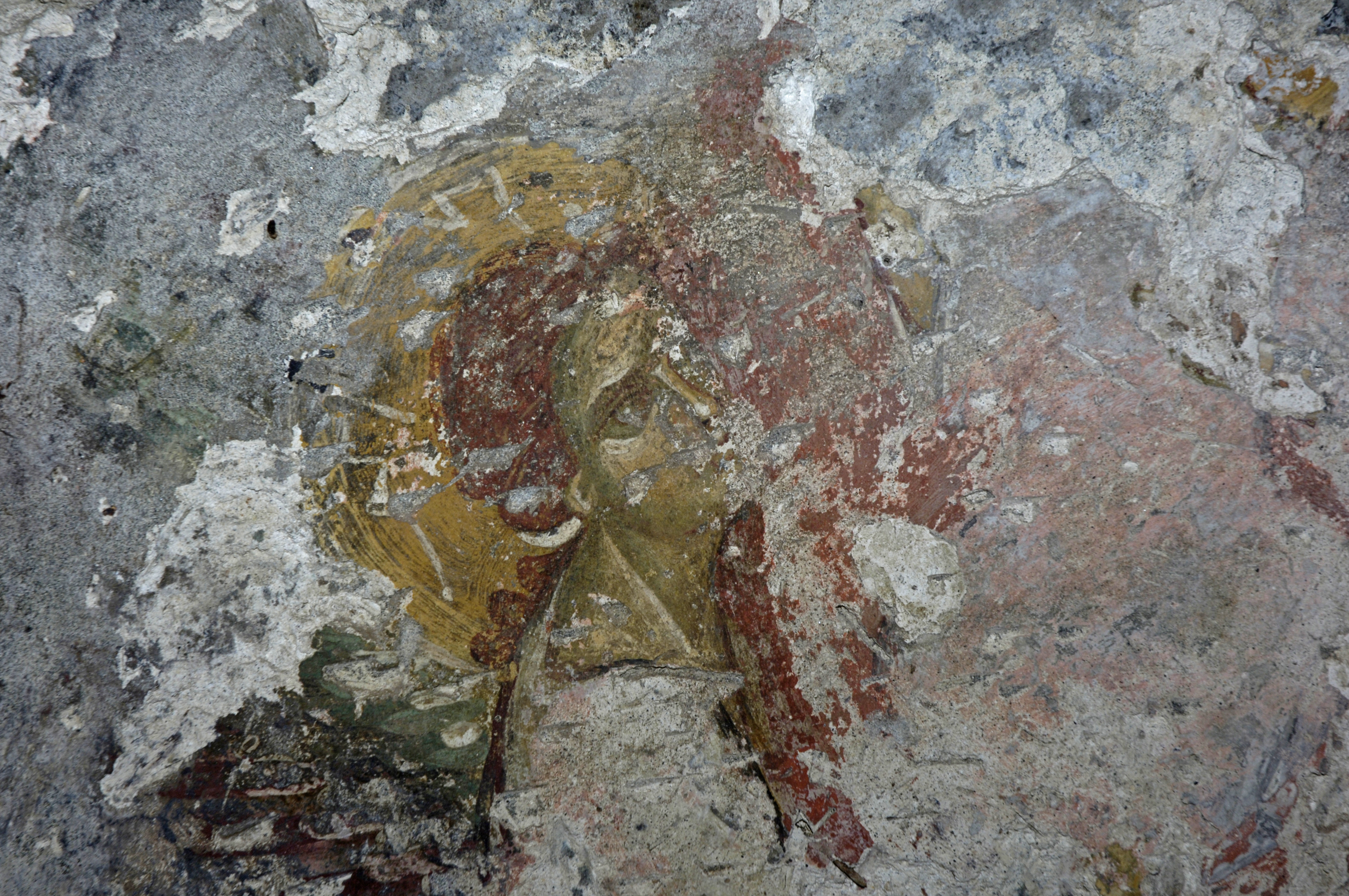
Panagia Theoskepastos Monastery aka Kızlar Manastırı

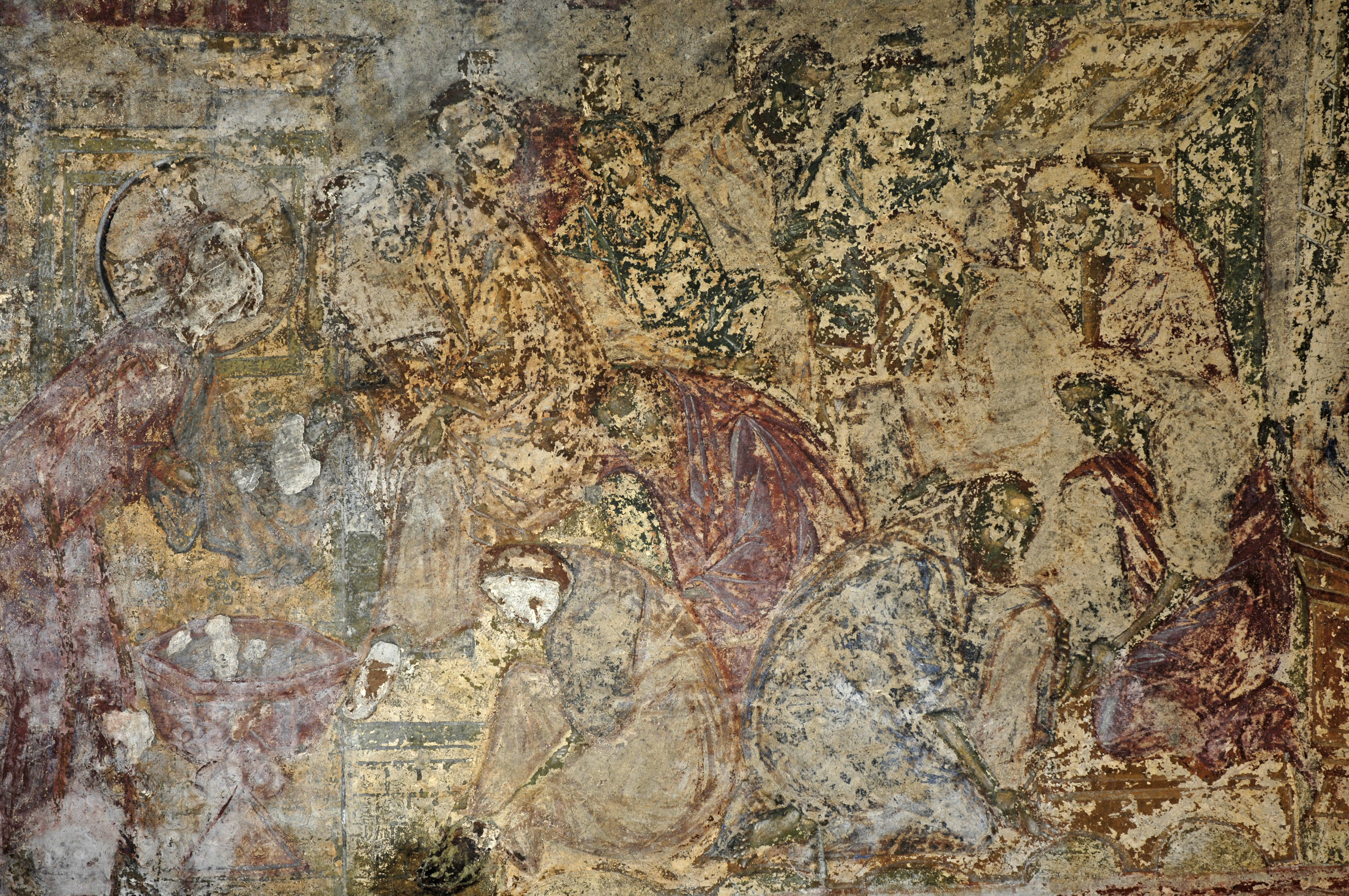
Panagia Theoskepastos Monastery aka Kızlar Manastırı

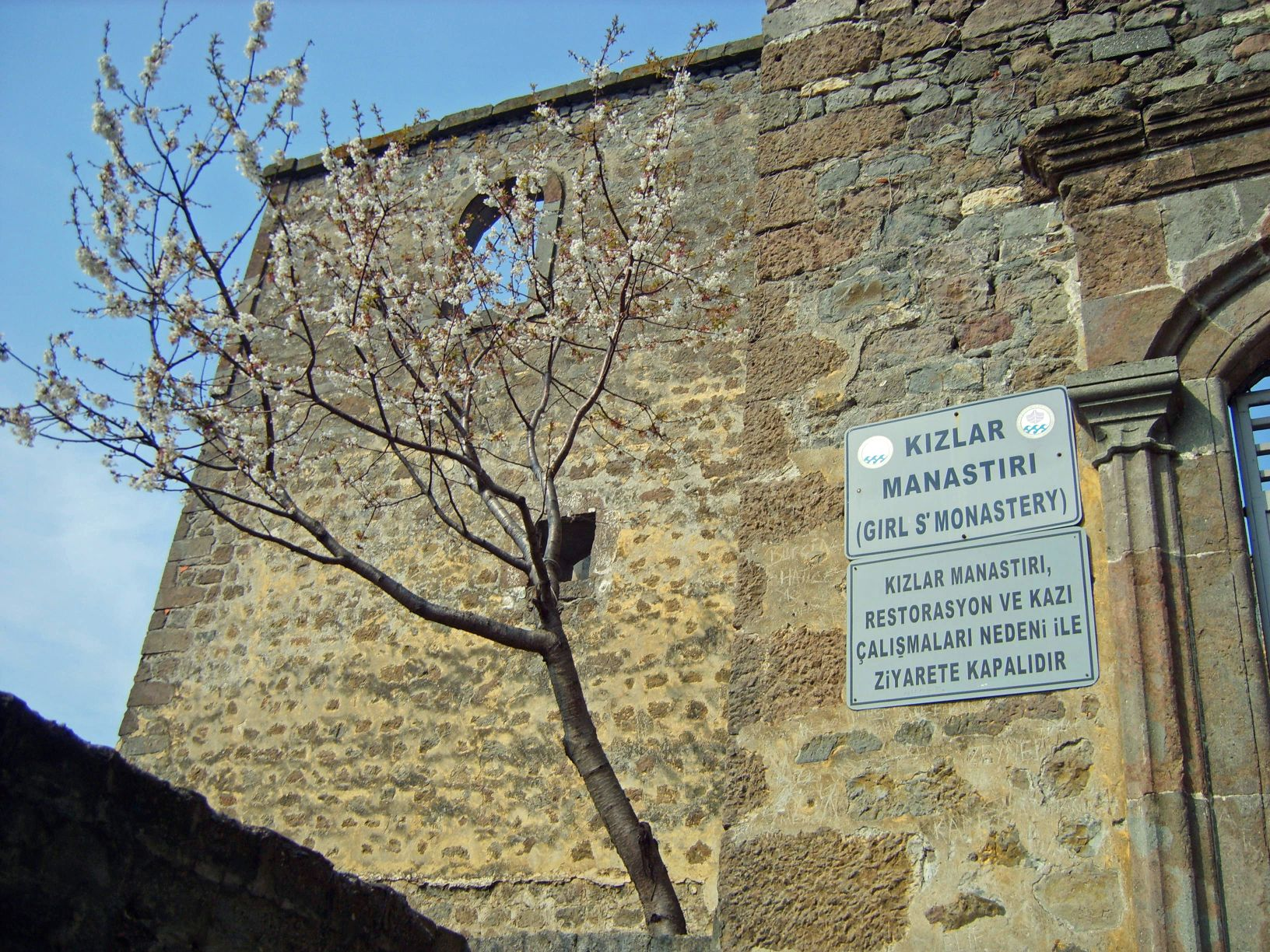
Entrance of the monastery
