= Alexios III =

Alexios III may refer to:

- Alexios III Angelos (c. 1153–1211), Emperor of the Byzantine Empire
- Alexios III of Trebizond (1338–1390), Emperor of Trebizond
