= Anna of Trebizond, Queen of Georgia =

Queen of Georgia from 1367 to 1393

Anna Megale Komnene

Queen consort of Georgia
- Tenure: June 1367–1393
- Born: 6 April 1357; Trebizond (modern-day Trabzon, Turkey)
- Died: After 1406
- Spouse: Bagrat V of Georgia (m. 1367; died 1393)
- Issue: Constantine I of Georgia; David; Olympias
- House: Komnenos
- Father: Alexios III of Trebizond
- Mother: Theodora Kantakouzene
- Religion: Greek Orthodox

Anna Megale Komnene (Greek: Άννα Μεγάλη Κομνηνή, romanized: Anna Megalē Komnēnē; Georgian: ანა კომნენა; 6 April 1357 - after 30 November 1406) was a Trapezuntine Queen of Georgia as the second wife of King Bagrat V. She was the mother of his youngest son, Constantine I, who would in 1407 succeed his half-brother, King George VII, and reign as king.

Anna was a member of the powerful Byzantine Greek Komnenos dynasty which was founded by Isaac I Komnenos in 1057.

== Family and betrothal ==
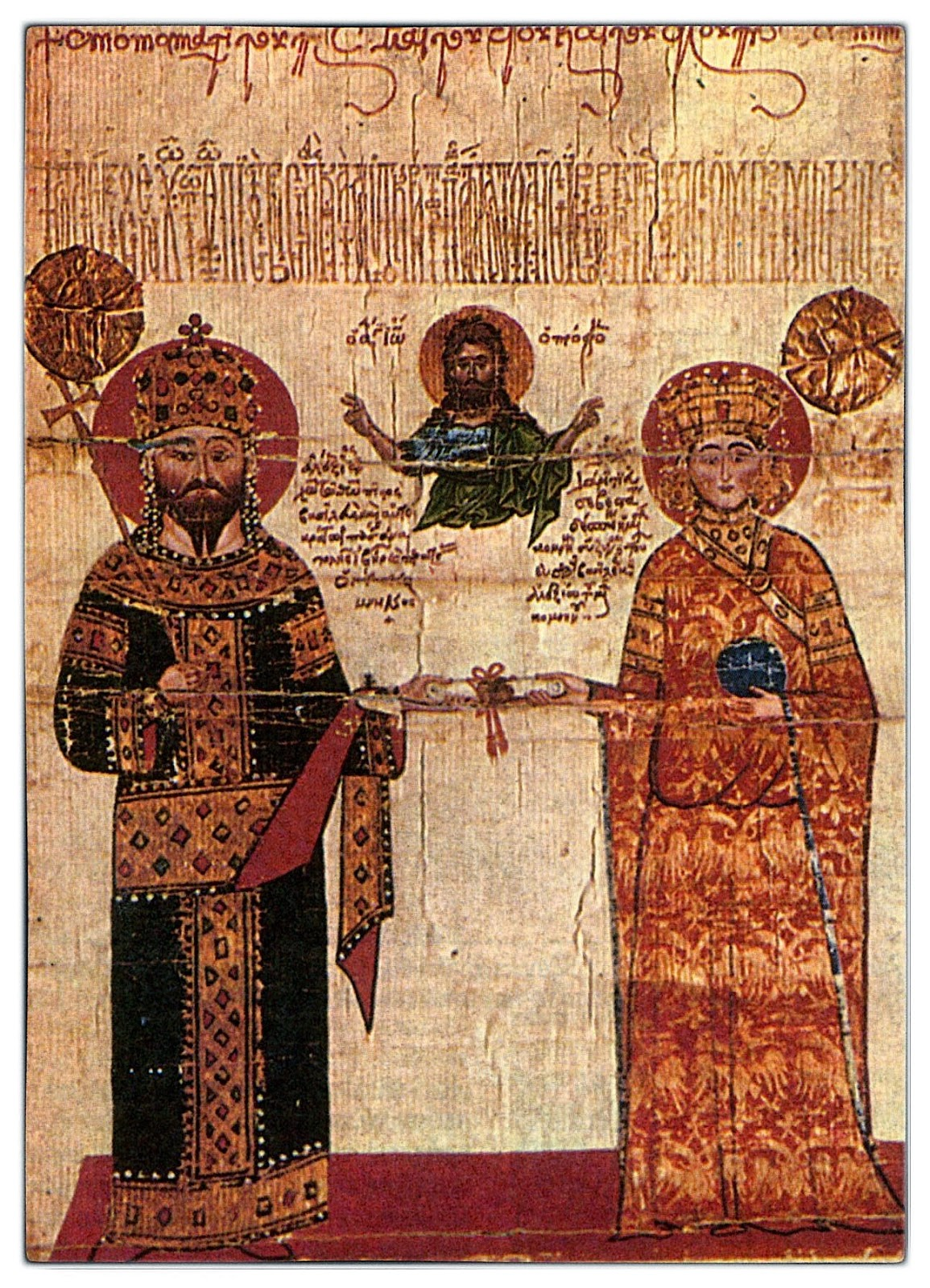
Emperor Alexios III of Trebizond and Theodora Kantakouzene, the parents of Anna of Trebizond

Anna was born in Trebizond on 6 April 1357, the day before Good Friday, the eldest daughter and child of Emperor Alexios III of Trebizond and Theodora Kantakouzene. She had two younger brothers, Basil and Manuel; and three younger sisters: Eudokia, Maria, and another whose name is not known; all three were later married to Muslim Turkmen rulers. Anna had also at least one illegitimate half-brother, Andronikos, by her father's liaison with an unnamed mistress.

In April 1362, a delegation that included megas logothetes George, the Scholaris, the Sebastos and the historian Michael Panaretos went to Constantinople, to negotiate her betrothal to Andronikos Palaiologos who would later rule as Byzantine Emperor Andronikos IV. For unknown reasons, the betrothal was annulled, and another husband was later chosen for her.

== Queen of Georgia ==
In June 1367, at the age of 10 years and two months, she became the second wife of King Bagrat V of Georgia, also known as Bagrat the Great. His first wife Helen had died the previous year of bubonic plague, leaving behind one son. Anna was accompanied to Georgia by her father and formidable paternal grandmother, Irene of Trebizond.

At an unknown date, sometime after 1369, Anna gave birth to a son, Constantine (died 1412). He would later reign as King Constantine I of Georgia, succeeding his childless half-brother, King George VII in 1407. According to Cyril Toumanoff, Anna had two other children by Bagrat: David and Olympias.

In November 1386, Tbilisi was besieged and captured by the invading forces of Turco-Mongol conqueror Timur; and she, along with her husband and son were taken prisoner. As a means of securing their release, King Bagrat agreed to become a Muslim, and Timur sent them back to Georgia with 20,000 Mongol troops. However, Prince George, her husband's son from his first marriage, was able to completely destroy the Mongol army and released the king and queen from captivity. In the end they didn't convert to Islam, although further battles were fought with Timur before he allowed the kingdom of Georgia to remain Christian. Anna's husband died in 1393; she died sometime after 1406.

Anna of Trebizond, Queen of Georgia Komnenos dynasty Born: 6 April 1357 Died: after 1406
Royal titles
Preceded by Helen	Queen consort of Georgia; 1367–1393	Succeeded by Nestan-Darejan
