= David IX =

King of Georgia from 1346 to 1360

King of Georgia
- Reign: 1346–1360
- Predecessor: George V
- Successor: Bagrat V
- Co-king: Bagrat V (1355–1360)
- Died: 1360
- Burial: Gelati monastery
- Spouse: Sindukhtar Jaqeli
- Issue: Bagrat V of Georgia; Gulkhan-Eudokia; Gulshar
- Dynasty: Bagrationi
- Father: George V of Georgia
- Religion: Georgian Orthodox Church

David IX (Georgian: დავით IX, romanized: davit IX; died 1360), from the Bagrationi dynasty, was king (mepe) of the Kingdom of Georgia from 1346 until his death in 1360.

== Life ==
David was the only known son of George V of Georgia and his mother may have been a princess of Trebizond.

He ascended the throne succeeding on the death of his father in 1346. However, the kingdom's stability and prosperity left by his father was not to last, as the Black Death swept through the area in 1348, decimating the population and producing a severe economic crisis.

Little is known about David IX's reign, during his reign Georgia minted coins for its neighbors, the short-lived Khans of Azerbaijan. Under David IX, Georgia lost the Laz territory to Trebizond empire. The Georgian kingdom retained its vassal territories, such as Alania.

In 1349–1350 David paid Ilkhan Anushirwan an annual tribute of 400,000 dinars not to invade Georgia. Several of the coins of Anushirwan were minted in Tiflis. Many of Georgia southern territories: Kars, Nakhchivan, and Garni now belonged to the Ilkhanate. The last Ilkhanid ruler Ghazan II also minted coins in his own name in Tiflis in 1356-1357.

Despite the mentioned difficult situation, David IX was engaged in state building work. According to the inscription of 1350 of the Tmogvi fortress, at the direction of King David, the walls of the castle were renovated. The king also paid attention to the facts of seizure of church estates by secular feudal lords during Mongol rule. He returned to the Mtskheti church the peasants and lands from the Dzami and Khedureti valleys given by David VII Ulu to the noble nobility, the Mtskheti church to Orbodzleli (King David paid 1200 tetri to Orbodzleli to give him the church estates).

According to Vakhushti of Kartli, King David's wife was Queen Sindukhtar, who seems to have been the sister of Agbugha, the prince of Samtskhe. One of the king's daughters, Gulshar, was married to Ioane of Ksani, and the other, Gulkhan-Eudokia, was married to Manuel, the youngest son of the Emperor Alexios III of Trebizond. This marriage, of course, was a political act and meant to strengthen the political union between Georgia and the Empire of Trebizond.

During David's reign, according to Vakhushti of Kartli, there was a solar eclipse in Georgia in 1357.

David died in 1360 in Geguti. He is buried in Gelati Monastery, he succeeded by his son, Bagrat V the Great.

=== Coinage and foreign control ===
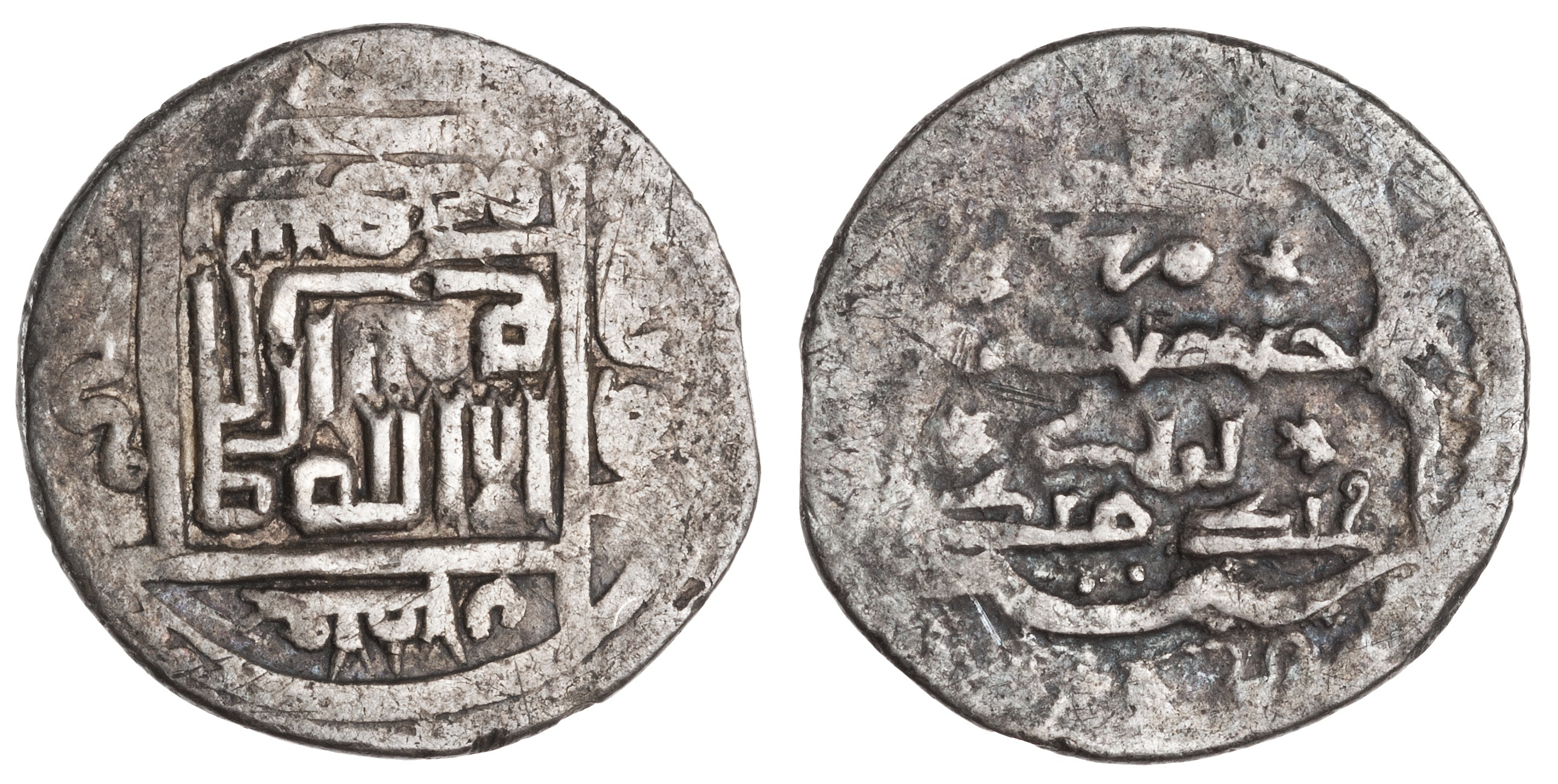
Silver Dirham of Anushirwan, minted in Tiflis in 1344-1353.

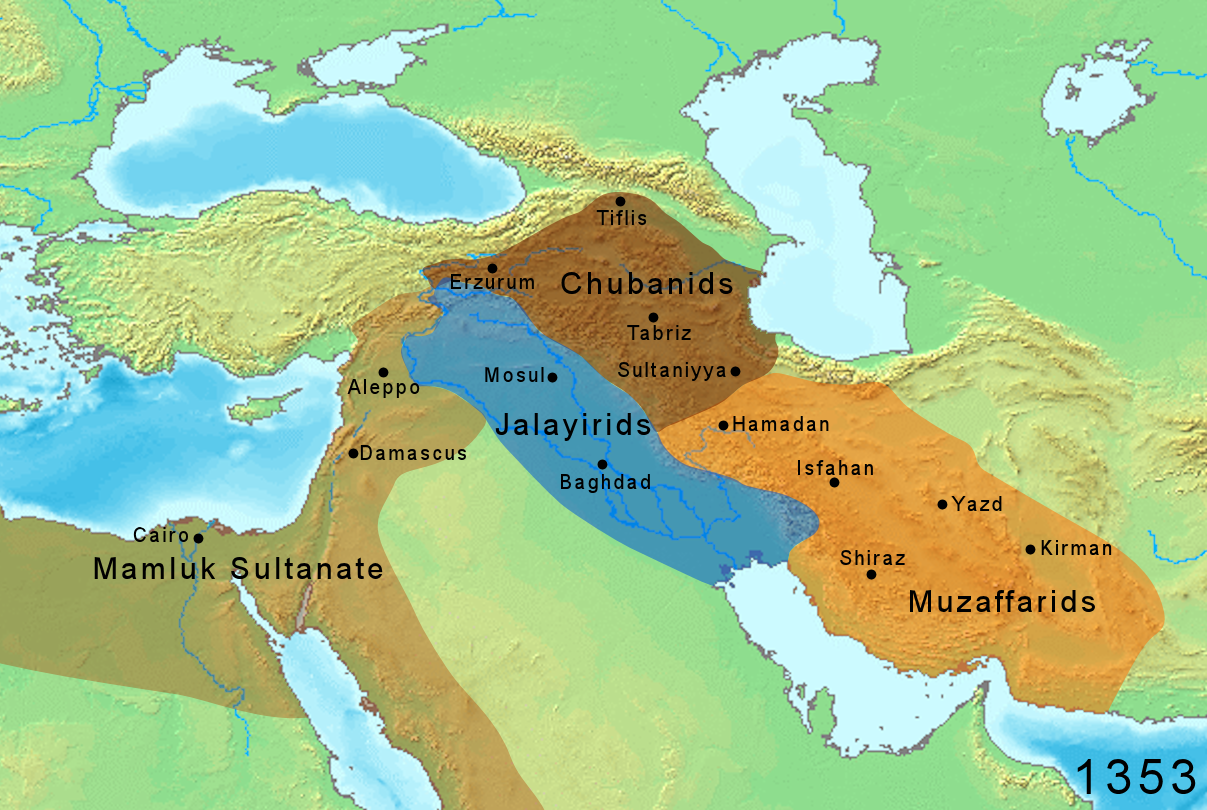
Jalayirids, Chobanids and Muzaffarids in 1353.

There is no known coinage of David IX. This could be explained by the numerous invasions, which resulted in foreign coinage being struck in Georgia, and particularly in the Georgian capital Tiflis (modern Tbilissi).

During the period from 1349-1356, Mongol Ilkhanid coins were minted in Tiflis, in the name of Anushirvan, the Ilkhanid puppet ruler put in place by the Chobanids.

In 1356, coins of the Golden Horde ruler Jani Beg were minted in Tiflis. In 1356-57, coins of the Ilkhanid Ghazan II were again minted in Tiflis, but this time following Golden Horde designs.

During the period 1357-1358, the Jalayirids took control of Transcaucasia, replacing the Il-Khanids. Minting in Georgia therefore fell under the prerogative of the Jalayirid Sultanate, and coins in the name of Shaykh Hasan and his successor Shaykh Uvais were minted in Tbilissi.

== Family ==
David IX was married to Sindukhtar, daughter of Ivane I Jaqeli, Prince of Samtskhe-Saatabago. They had three children:

- Bagrat V of Georgia (died 1393), King of Georgia (r. 1360–1393);
- Gulkhan-Eudokia of Georgia (died 1395), who was betrothed first to Andronicus Comnenus and after he died his paternal half-brother, Emperor Manuel III of Trebizond, whom she married in 1379. Both were sons of Alexios III of Trebizond, the first was an illegitimate and the second a legitimate son by Empress Theodora Kantakouzene
- Gulshar, she was married to Ioane Kvenipneveli, Duke of Ksani.

| Preceded by George V the Brilliant | King of Georgia; 1346–1360 | Succeeded by Bagrat V the Great |
