= Eudokia of Trebizond =

Byzantine noble

- Died: after 4 September 1395
- Spouse: Taj al-Din Chelebi (m. 1379; dead 1386) Konstantin Dragaš (m. 1387; dead 1395)
- Issue: Altamur
- House: Komnenos
- Father: Alexios III of Trebizond
- Mother: Theodora Kantakouzene

Eudokia Megale Komnene (died after 4 September 1395), was a Trapezuntine princess and a member of the powerful Byzantine Komnenos dynasty as a daughter of Emperor Alexios III of Trebizond.

She was styled Despoina in Sinop after her first marriage to Muslim Turkmen Tadjeddin Pasha of Sinop, Emir of Limnia, which had been arranged by her father to foster peaceful relations between the Pontic Greek Christians and the neighbouring Muslims.

== Family and marriages ==
Eudokia was born on an unknown date, the second daughter of Emperor Alexios III and Theodora Kantakouzene. She had two brothers, and four sisters; the eldest Anna later became Queen consort of Georgia as the second wife of King Bagrat V.

The Chronicle of Michael Panaretos records the marriage on "8 October 1378 at Oinaion of Eudokia and Muslim Turkmen ruler Tadjeddin Pasha of Sinop, Emir of Limnia" after which "the Emperor took over Limnia". Her sisters, Maria and others two whose name has not come down to us also married Muslims, but "in this case the bridegroom ... was by far the best." According to Elizabeth Zachariadou, Tadjeddin was not prince of Limnia, but of Niksar, where the tomb of Melik Danishmend is located, and whose territory comprised the fertile plain of Phanaroia, and important fortresses such as Iskefser and Sonusa.

Tadjeddin had sent an envoy to Alexios, who met with the Emperor June 1362 to discuss a marriage, but popular sentiment was against a possible marriage at the time. Such an arrangement was not unprecedented. Prior to Eudokia's wedding, at least two of Alexios' sisters had been married to neighboring Muslim rulers: Maria had been married to Fahreddin Kutlug beg, Emir of Aq Qoyunlu in 1352, while Theodora became the wife of Hajji 'Umar, Emir of Chalybia in 1358.

Anthony Bryer discussed the diplomatic strategy of marriages like this—for which the later Empire of Trebizond was famous—in his 1975 paper. He documented no fewer than 11 marriages between princesses of the Grand Komnenoi and their Turkmen neighbors, while only five princesses were married to Christian rulers. Tension existed in these relationships not only due to difference over religions, but to marriage customs. "It would be especially interesting to know why popular opinion made Alexios III refuse Tadeddin's first request for a bride in 1362," writes Bryer, then discusses possible political reasons for the extended parley and Eudokia's possible situation in Tadjeddin's court, before admitting that the situation "was probably left as ambiguous as Panaretos is on the subject, for, so far as Alexios III was concerned, the ends amply justified the means." Zachariadou notes that around 1362 Tadjeddin was an ally of the emir of Amasya, and both faced a dangerous foe in Eretna, the ruler of Sivas; to form an alliance with Tadjeddin at that time, observes Zachariadou, "would openly place them in the anti-Sivas front". Further, Tadjeddin was not on good terms with his neighbor Hajji 'Umar, the husband of Eudokia's aunt Theodora. But the situation changed considerably between 1362 and 1379: Eretna had been succeeded by Kadi Burhan al-Din as sultan of Sivas, and the Kadi had formed an alliance with Kılıç Arslan, an emir who had raided Trapezuntine territory several times between those two years. By the date of Eudokia's marriage, both Alexios and Tadjeddin needed each other.

Following her marriage, Eudokia was styled Despoina in Sinop. Although George Sphrantzes later notes that she had several children by Tadjeddin, only the name of one son, Altamur, is known. Altamur himself had children by other women, who left descendants. Tadjeddin died in battle 24 October 1386 fighting his uncle Haji 'Umar, where he was "cut to pieces".

Not long after Tadjeddin died, she married Constantine Dragaš, a regional semi-independent Serbian lord. Although Laonikos Chalkokondyles states that Eudokia was the second wife of Byzantine Emperor John V Palaiologos, and William Miller repeats the historian's account of how she had been betrothed to John's son but upon meeting her the Emperor decided to marry her himself, Chalkondyles' account has been rejected by modern scholars. Eudokia's marriage to Constantine set a precedent for a Byzantine to marry a former member of a Turkish harem. Although she did not bear her second husband offspring, she had stepchildren from his first marriage, including Helena Dragaš.

On 17 May 1395, she lost her second husband at the Battle of Rovine; and on 4 September of that same year, Panaretos notes that she "came from Constantinople with brides for her brother, Emperor Manuel and nephew, Lord Alexios", entering Trebizond "on Sunday, the following day in a shower of rain". After that date there is no further mention of her, but it is presumed she spent her last years in Trebizond.

== Sources ==
- Bryer, Anthony (1975). "Greeks and Turkmens: The Pontic Exception" (PDF). Dumbarton Oaks Papers. 29. Dumbarton Oaks: 113–148. doi:10.2307/1291371. JSTOR 1291371.
