= New Friday Mosque =

Mosque in Trabzon, Turkey

- Yeni Cuma Camii
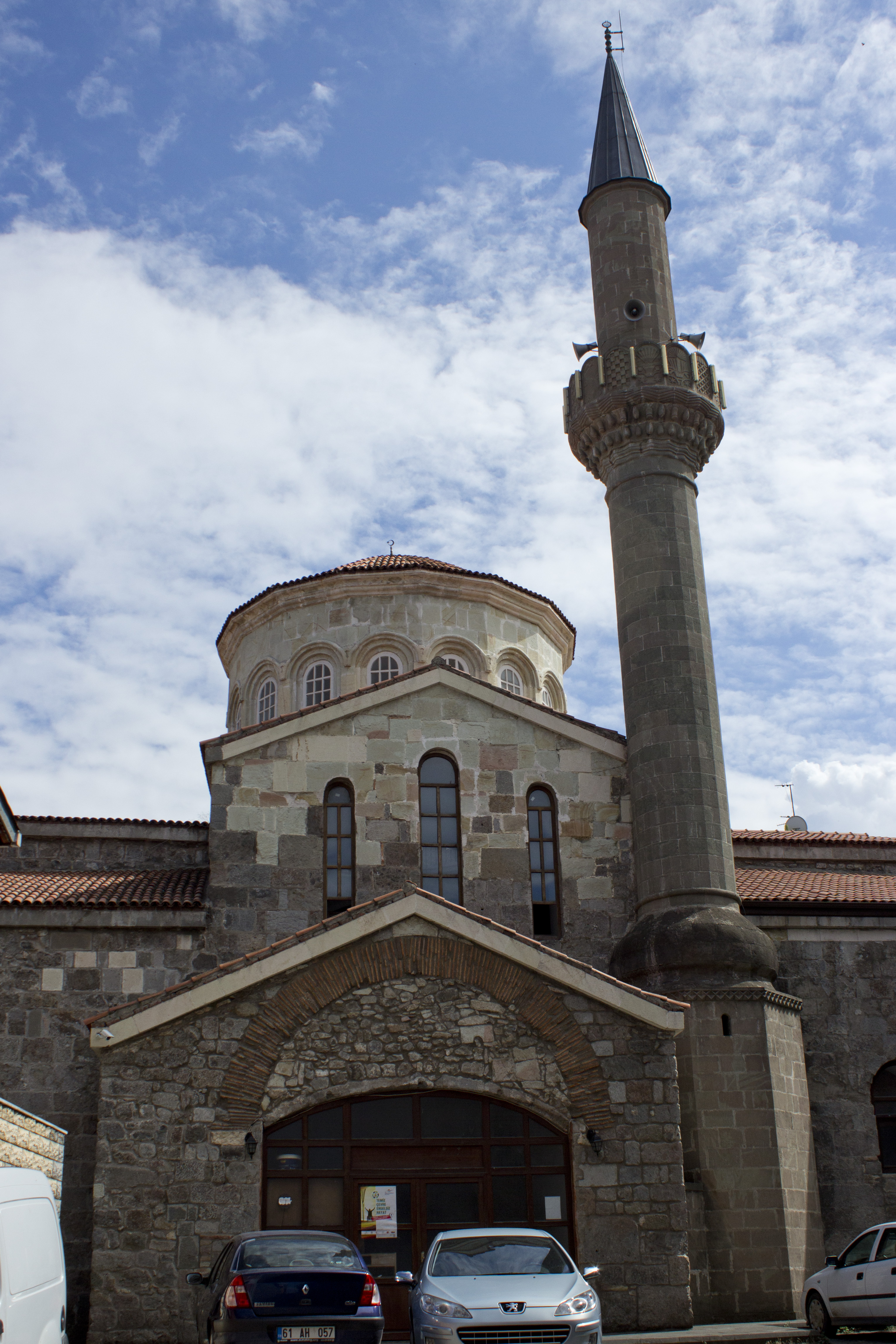

- Location within Turkey

Religion
- Affiliation: Islam

Location
- Municipality: Trabzon
- Country: Turkey
- Interactive map of New Friday Mosque
- Coordinates: 41°00′04″N 39°43′21″E

Architecture
- Type: mosque
- Established: 1461

The New Juma Mosque (Turkish: Yeni Cuma Camii) is a mosque in Trabzon, Turkey. It was built during Byzantine times as the Hagios Eugenios Church, dedicated to Saint Eugenius, the patron saint of the city. Following the capture of the city by Sultan Mehmed the Conqueror in 1461, like many churches in that city it was converted to a mosque.

== Overview ==
It is not known exactly when the church was built, however researchers consider that it was a basilica. An inscription dated 1291 has been found near it. However, during the siege of Trebizond in 1222, Sultan Melik, enraged at the resistance of the city's inhabitants, is said to have ordered the upper walls torn down and the floors broken and pulled up, so it is likely the present structure was built in the years immediately afterwards.

Jakob Philipp Fallmerayer, who visited Trebizond in the early 19th century, reports that he saw remains of paintings of the Emperors of Trebizond from Alexios I to Alexios III inside, each with an inscription giving the title and name of the subjects; although by the time Gabriel Millet inspected the building, the inscriptions had disappeared, Millet confirmed traces of the paintings remained to the left of the entrance: "one person wearing the loros; another seems to hold a scepter; to the right, a third kneels, presenting an object, no doubt the church which he founded, to a saint seated and dressed like a martyrs, in Byzantine costume."

The present building has no narthex today, but there are three naves. The middle apse is rounded on the inside and pentagonal on the outside. The minaret was added at the area around the north door of the church, which was turned into a mosque after the Ottoman conquest in 1461. The stone mihrab (altar niche) is of baroque style, and the mimber (pulpit) is of wood with no ornamentation.
