= Gulkhan-Eudokia of Georgia =

Empress-consort of Trebizond

Gulkhan-Eudokia (Georgian: გულქან-ევდოკია) (died 2 May 1395) was the first Empress consort of Manuel III of Trebizond. Her original name was Gulkhan Khatun; Eudokia was her Christian baptismal name.

== Family ==
Gulkhan was a daughter of David IX of Georgia and his wife Sindukhtar Jaqeli. She was also a sister of Bagrat V of Georgia.

Her paternal grandfather was George V of Georgia. The identity of his wife is not known. "The Georgian Chronicles" of the 18th century reports him marrying a daughter of "the Greek Emperor, Lord Michael Komnenos". However the reigning dynasty of the Byzantine Empire in the 14th century were the Palaiologoi, not the Komnenoi. The marriage of a daughter of Michael IX Palaiologos and his wife Rita of Armenia to a Georgian ruler is not recorded in Byzantine sources. Neither is the existence of any illegitimate daughters of Michael IX. The Komnenoi did rule however in the Empire of Trebizond. A Michael Komnenos was Emperor from 1344 to 1349. His wife was Acropolitissa. Their only child recorded in primary sources was John III of Trebizond. Whether John III had siblings is unknown.

Her maternal grandfather was Qvarqvare II Jaqeli, Prince of Samtskhe. The Jaqeli held the Georgian feudal office of Eristavi, a title that could be "governor of a region" or an "army-commander", roughly equivalent to the Byzantine strategos and normally translated into English as "duke".

== Marriage ==
Gulkhan was first betrothed or married to Andronikos of Trebizond, an illegitimate son of Alexios III of Trebizond. On 14 March 1376, Andronikos fell from a window in the imperial palace and subsequently died from his injuries. According to Michael Panaretos, only his mother and the Empress mother took part in the funeral procession, and the betrothal was transferred to Manuel III of Trebizond, whom Panaretos describes as the "younger, proper and legitimate" son of the Emperor. Details like these have led historians to suspect more to the incident. The Europäische Stammtafeln: Stammtafeln zur Geschichte der Europäischen Staaten (1978) by Detlev Schwennicke reports him killed by being thrown out of a tower.

Panaretos sets forth Gulkhan's chronology in the marriage process. The revised betrothal was negotiated while she was still residing in Iberia: she left her father's kingdom and met the imperial party at Macragialos on 15 August 1377; together they returned to Trebizond on Sunday, 30 August. On 5 September Gulkhan was crowned Empress, taking the royal name of Eudokia, and she was married to Manuel the next day by the Metropolitan of Trebizond, Theodosius; the nuptial festivities lasted a week.

Their only known son would reign as Alexios IV of Trebizond.

== Empress ==
On 20 March 1390, Alexios III died. Manuel III succeeded him with Gulkhan as his Empress consort. Her term as Empress was brief, ending with her death on 2 May 1395. Manuel would go on to marry Anna Philanthropene.

== Notes ==
Royal titles
Preceded by Theodora Kantakouzene	Empress consort of Trebizond; 1390–1395	Succeeded by Anna Philanthropene
