= Andronikos I =

Andronikos I may refer to:

- Andronikos I Komnenos (1183–1185), Byzantine Emperor
- Andronikos I of Trebizond (1222–1235), Emperor of Trebizond
