= Siege of Trebizond (1222–1223) =

Turkish siege of Trebizond in 1223

Date	1222–1223
Location	Trebizond
Result	Trapezuntine victory

Belligerents
Empire of Trebizond	Sultanate of Rum

Commanders and leaders
Andronikos I Gidos	Melik (POW)

The siege of Trebizond in 1222–1223 was an unsuccessful siege of Trebizond, the capital of the namesake empire, by the Sultanate of Rum under a certain Melik. According to the late 14th-century Synopsis of Saint Eugenios of John Lazaropoulos, the city was close to being captured but was saved by an unusually severe storm. The Seljuq assaults were repulsed, and their army was annihilated on its retreat through the attacks of the Matzoukaites, fierce mountain tribes under Trebizond's rule, and Melik was captured.

Historians of Trebizond have traditionally seen the failure of this siege as leading to the termination of Trebizond's vassal status to the Sultanate of Iconium, which had been in place since 1214. However, more recent scholarship that considers the context of Seljuk Turkish history suggests that this battle should be seen as one episode in a struggle between Trebizond and Iconium over control of Sinope, the northern coast of Anatolia, and access to the Black Sea and its hinterlands that lasted for most of the 13th century.

The details of the siege and the events leading up to it are preserved in four sources: the Chronicle of Michael Panaretos, the Encomium of St Eugenius of Trebizond by Constantine Loukites, the chronicle of Ali ibn al-Athir, and most extensively, the Synopsis of John Lazaropoulos. A possible fifth one is the Syrian chronicler Ibn Natif, who refers to a conflict dated around 1230 between Sultan Kaykubad and "Laskari" where Kaykubad won the first battle but lost the second; R.M. Shukurov has tried to identify those conflicts with this one, but Peacock is probably right in identifying them as a confused report of the 1214 siege of Sinope. In his edition of Lazaropoulos' work, Jon Olof Rosenqvist notes several problems in Lazaropoulos' account, which led Rosenqvist to argue that he used two sources, one he identifies as consisting of hagiographic materials, and a second Rosenqvist speculates was an "epic composition in verse" comparable to the Digenis Akritas. He suggests the image of his astrologers who, upon being asked for advice, consult an astrolabe, could have come from this lost epic, as it was "a standing element in medieval Turkish epics such as the fourteenth-century Melikdanismendnameh." Rosenqvist goes as far as to identify some words and phrases that may have come from the epic verse, although admitting "for purely statistical reasons a certain amount of such verse fragments—perhaps even complete verses—should be expected in a given amount of average Greek prose."

The most detailed account of the siege and the events leading up to it is that of Lazaropoulos; unless otherwise stated, the following narrative is based on what he wrote.

== Background ==
On the ascension of Emperor Andronikos I Gidos in 1222, the Empire of Trebizond faced a serious rival in the adjacent Seljuk Sultanate of Rum. One of Andronikos' first acts was to negotiate a treaty with Sultan Melik, which stipulated peaceful relations between the rulers. However, Melik's vassal Etoumes, rais of Sinope, broke that treaty when he plundered a ship bearing archon Alexios Paktiares and the taxes of Trebizond's province of Cherson; in response Emperor Andronikos ordered a retaliatory raid on Sinope. The Trapezuntine fleet anchored off Karousa (modern Gerze) and pillaged the countryside up to the marketplace of Sinope, seizing the ships in the harbor and killing or capturing their crews. Rais Etoumes was pressured to ransom the captives by releasing Paktiares, the ship, and its goods, and the expedition returned to Trebizond, elated by their success.

When word of this attack reached Sultan Melik at Iconium, he decided he could not bear this attack on his chief port on the Black Sea, and he mobilized his army at Erzurum. Emperor Andronikos learned of the Sultan's mobilization and prepared for the coming conflict, gathering soldiers "from Soteropolis and Lazica to Oinaion"—which is commonly assumed to define the borders of the Empire during his reign. Both sides were prepared for the coming conflict.

The date of the attack on Sinope and the ensuing siege of Trebizond can be determined from three sources: John Lazaropoulos, Michael Panaretos, and Ali ibn al-Athir. John Lazaropoulos dates these events to the Byzantine year of the world 6371, in the second year of the reign of Andronikos I Gidos; the Byzantine year started on 1 September and ended on the last day of August, and because Alexios I died 1 February 1222, it is clear the second year of the reign of Andronikos began in February 1223, Lazaropoulos' dating points to some time between February 1223 and September of the same year. The Chronicle of Michael Panaretos uses the same words to date the defeat of Melik, so we can be assured the siege also fell within this period. But Lazaropoulos does not usually provide exact dates: this is the only one in his writings. Beyond providing the sequence of actions, he gives no information on how much time passed between the rapacious acts of Etoumes, the Trapezuntine raid on Sinope, and the beginning of the siege itself, making it possible the first two happened earlier—perhaps years—before 1223. Fortunately, our third source, Ali ibn al-Athir, mentions that in 1223, a ship of refugees from the Mongols sank off Anatolia, which the Seljuks then plundered; so it is clear all three events happened over these six months between February and September 1223.

== First skirmishes ==
The most complete account of this engagement is in John Lazaropoulos' Synopsis, although his text offers many difficulties. As Jan Olof Rosenqvist points out, Lazaropoulos drew on at least two different sources, which results in certain problems of interpretation, as well as raising the possibility that certain incidents are described twice. Moreover, Lazaropoulos has been shown to have introduced new details elsewhere that may be his own invention; the purpose of his account is not to offer an objective history but to glorify Trebizond's patron saint, Eugenios.

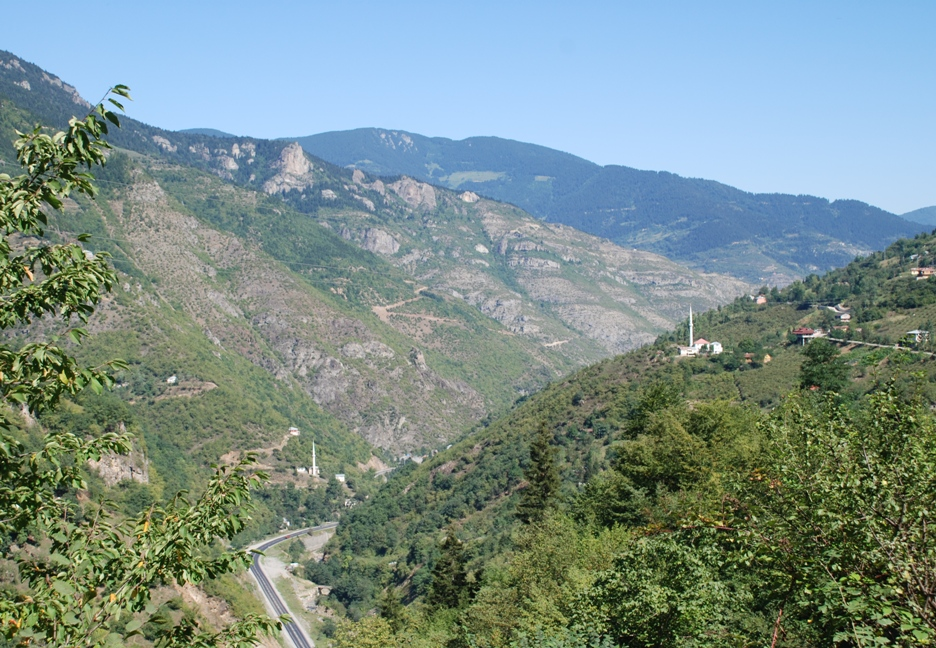
Zigana pass

At some undefined time after the raid on Sinope, Sultan Melik brought his forces through Katoukion, which lies between Bayburt and Zailousa, where his men camped. The inhabitants explained the best route would be "beyond and outside Chaldia" because that country "is difficult of access but also abounding in warlike men, and that the march would not be easy." Upon receiving this intelligence, the Sultan moved his camp to a place somewhere above the Narrow Pass (which Rosenqvist identifies with the Pontic Gates, also known as Zigana Pass).

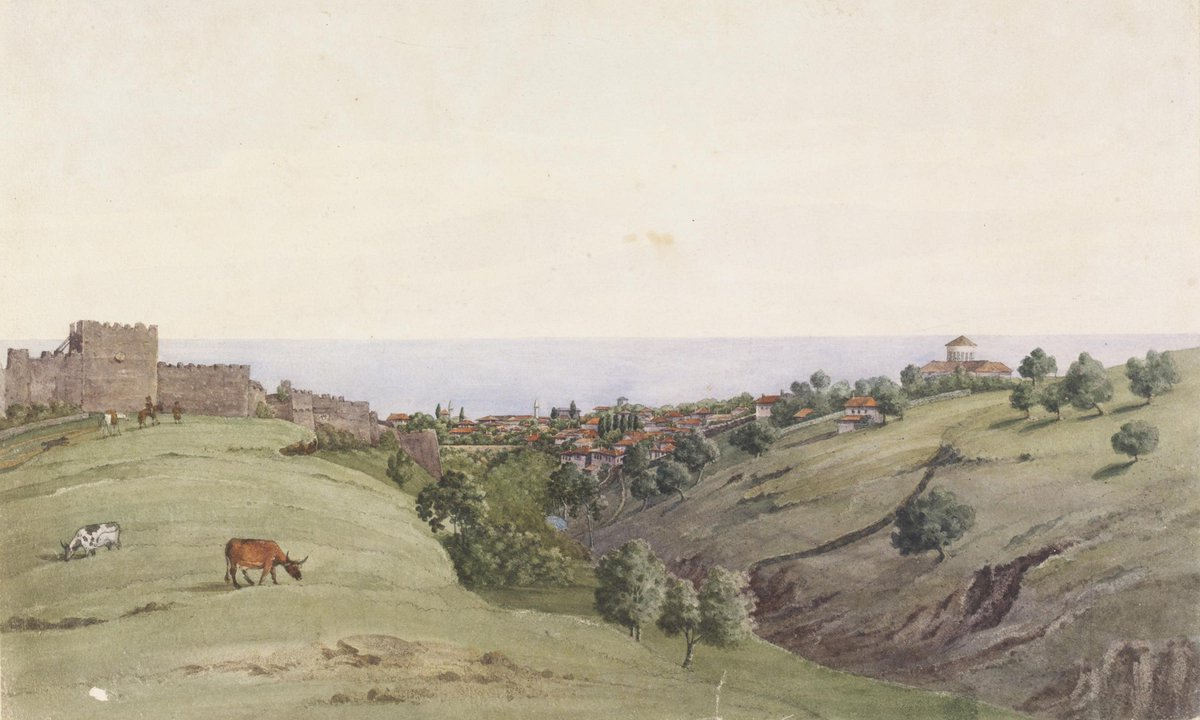
A 1833 watercolor by Godfrey Thomas Vigne of Trebizond from the south

The Emperor Andronikos had sent Theodore Polemarches with a band of reliable men to keep watch at the Narrow Pass; these encountered the advancing Seljuk force and skirmished with them. It was Theodore who sent word to the Emperor that the Sultan had arrived; Lazaropoulos observes that Emperor Andronikos was at church when the news came, and he waited until he had received the Eucharist before leading his own 500 horsemen against the vanguard of the Sultan's army. Although his 500 horses were outnumbered four-to-one by the Sultan's scouts, Andronikos won the first major engagement, scattering the enemy; but seeing that this was only a portion of his foe, after he secured the castle of Labra, the Emperor withdrew into the city of Trebizond. The Sultan descended from the Pass and set up his camp on Mount Minthrion next to the Monastery of Saint Eugenios. Michel Kuršanskis believes the locals considered this the largest army they had ever seen. The Sultan's men encircled the formidable walls and set fire to the market of Trebizond, which was part of the suburbs east of the city. As night fell, we are told that Emperor Andronikos Gidos left the citadel and went to pray in Panagia Chrysokephalos Church to relieve his stress. The siege now began in earnest.

== Assaults and sorties ==
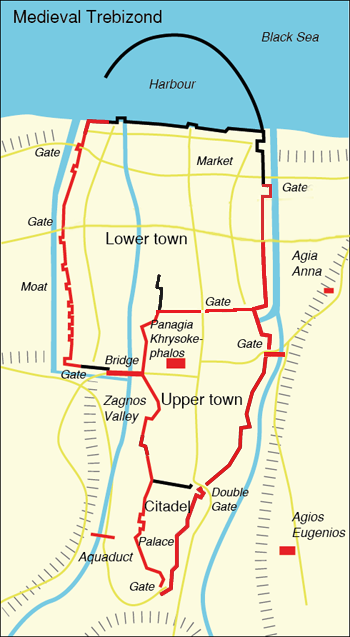
Fortification plan of Trebizond. The walls enclosing the Lower City did not exist in 1222.

Over the next few days the Sultan inspected the walls of Trebizond, finding only the defenders' arrows. Then he made his decision and ordered the first assault. Lazaropoulos' text is unclear here, but the first assault was against a part of the walls near the citadel. The attackers were met by an equal number of defenders, and aided by the difficult terrain that prevented more than a few of the enemy from approaching and strike, they rebuffed the attack.

The next assault came the following day. The wall facing the seashore was low and judged vulnerable. Hence, the besiegers moved their tents along the shore from the Old Arsenal as far as the "Western river" — the ravine immediately to the west of the walled city. "The trumpeters gave the signal for fight, and one single cry was uttered by all the godless," Lazaropoulos writes. "The commanders placed the armoured cavalry near to the wall and behind them the slingers, the soldiers who would throw rocks, the archers and those who carried shields, and between these those who operated battering-rams."

While the Sultan's army attacked the gate on this side of the city, the Emperor and his commanders observed that the troops stationed around the Sultan's camp next to the church of St. Eugenios were dispirited and vulnerable. He released a cavalry attack upon that position, overrunning the Sultan's camp and causing havoc. When the Sultan and his commanders learned of this attack, they withdrew from their assault on the city walls and proceeded back to Mount Minthrion. The Trapezuntine army advanced toward them and took their position near the Church of St. Prokopios. They skirmished with an advance party of Turkish horsemen, and leading men of both armies fell there, including, according to Lazaropoulos, the rais Etoumes (whose predations led to this siege), and Iatatines, the son of the Sultan's cousin, on the Seljuk side, while on the Trapezuntine side fell George Tornikes, the commander of the Trapezuntine troops, and four other prominent Trapezuntines. When the rest of the Sultan's army began to arrive, "the Emperor calmly led his army off, and passing across the ravine of St. George and the place of Three Hazels he safely entered the city". The assault infuriated the Sultan, and he ordered that the church of St. Eugenios be pulled down and the floor broken and pulled up.

The Sultan's troops renewed their assault the next day. After ringing Arabic cymbals, rattles, and Libyan percussion instruments, they attacked with a single cry, shooting arrows and throwing javelins, stones, and other missiles. The defenders responded with their own missiles until the attacker's arrows were exhausted, when "the sons of the Laz" made a sortie on horseback and drove the attackers back.

The next day, the Sultan delivered a speech to the city, demanding their surrender. In response, the Emperor invited the Sultan to send an embassy to discuss a possible treaty of peace; when the emissaries were inside the city, Andronikos made a point of showing them the ample stocks of food and supplies they had stocked up. The Sultan's men returned and reported what they saw, which distressed the Sultan.

By this point, the people from the countryside, as well as the region of Matzouka, decided that the Sultan's army was not as formidable as they had first thought. Once night fell, a number of them raided the Sultan's camp: they stole horses, plundered the camp, took prisoners, and chased away the guards. Again the Sultan vented his resentment against the church of St. Eugenios, inviting his men to make their quarters in the building while "some lascivious women" entertained them by "exciting themselves to frenzy", much to the horror of Lazaropoulos.

That night, according to Lazaropoulos, Saint Eugenios visited the Sultan and presented himself as the leader of the common people of the city and told the sultan the inhabitants wanted to betray the city to him. The Sultan then gathered his forces as quickly as he could and led them towards the city, expecting to meet his night-time visitor who would open the gates to him; instead, a mighty storm caught his unprepared men, who were subjected to thunder, hail, lightning, and high winds. A flood of water swept through the Seljuk troops, drowning some and scattering the rest.

Whether this miraculous storm was the work of Saint Eugenios and whether this storm was the cause of the Seljuk defeat, other sources confirm that the Sultan suffered a serious loss and was forced to lift his siege and flee. Constantine Loukites, alluding to the siege in his Encomium on Eugenios, states it was St. Eugenios who not only took both the Sultan's men and property but helped Andronikos Gidos to capture Melik. The one detail Michael Panaretos shares about the Sultan's attack on Trebizond in his terse Chronicle is that "nearly all of his [Sultan Melik's] men were lost".

At this point, the Sultan Melik fled the field with some of his guards. Some light-armed Matzoukans captured him at Kouratoreion; a church to St. Eugenios was constructed at the site, still standing in Lazaropoulos' time. Loukites described the Sultan, after being caught fleeing the battlefield, being led "by the hand like a slave, he that before this used to be an utterly haughty man."

== Aftermath ==
Melik was brought a prisoner to Trebizond, where Andronikos received him with honor. Andronikos summoned a council for advice about what to do with their important prisoner; his councilors agreed to release him. A pact was made between them that in the future, the tie of vassalage, which had previously bound Trebizond to Iconium, should cease and that the Trapezuntines should no longer be obliged either to perform military service to the sultan or to render tribute or gifts. The Sultan Melik is reportedly so impressed by this moderation that he sent an annual present of Arab horses to Andronikos and money to the St Eugenios monastery.

William Miller considers the independence of Trebizond gained with this victory ended in 1230. Jalal-ad-din, the Sultan of Khwarizm, invaded Anatolia in a direct challenge to the Sultanate of Iconium. Jalal-ad-din, who had conquered Georgia in the 1220s, was now a neighbor of Trebizond. Andronikos considered neutrality impossible and allied with the Khwarizmshah and agreed to war with the Seljuks. Many of Jalal-ad-din's troops, after their defeat at the Battle of Yassıçemen in 1230, sought refuge at Trebizond, leading Miller to conclude that Andronikos had assisted the Shah in that battle. Miller also cites the information of Vincent de Beauvais, who wrote the ruler of Trebizond used to send the sultan 200 lances (1,000 men).

== Identity of Melik ==
"'Melik' is a title ('king, sovereign') rather than a name and is of little help in identifying his man", writes Rosenqvist. Melik is mentioned as the leader of the Seljuks who besieged Trebizond in three primary sources: the Encomium on Eugenios of Constantine Loukites, the Chronicle of Michael Panaretos, and Lazaropoulos' Synopsis. Only Lazaropoulos furnishes the information that Melik was "the son of the great Sultan Alatines Saapatines", and in a later passage mentions his cousin "Iatatine", whose son was killed in combat; these details may either be from a tradition only Lazaropoulos preserved or his own speculation. In some older research, there are three possible persons Melik has been identified with: a son of Ala'al-Din Kaykubad, Sultan of Iconium; the Sultan Ala'al-Din Kaykubad, son of Giyat al-Din Kaykhusraw; or the Seljuq emir of Bayburt, Mugit al-Din Tughril Shah.
