= Kenchrina =

Kenchrina is a former settlement on the Black Sea coast. Anthony Bryer tentatively locates it on Cape Zephyrium. During the thirteenth and fourteenth centuries it was a part of the Empire of Trebizond.
