= Theodora Kantakouzene =

- Empress consort
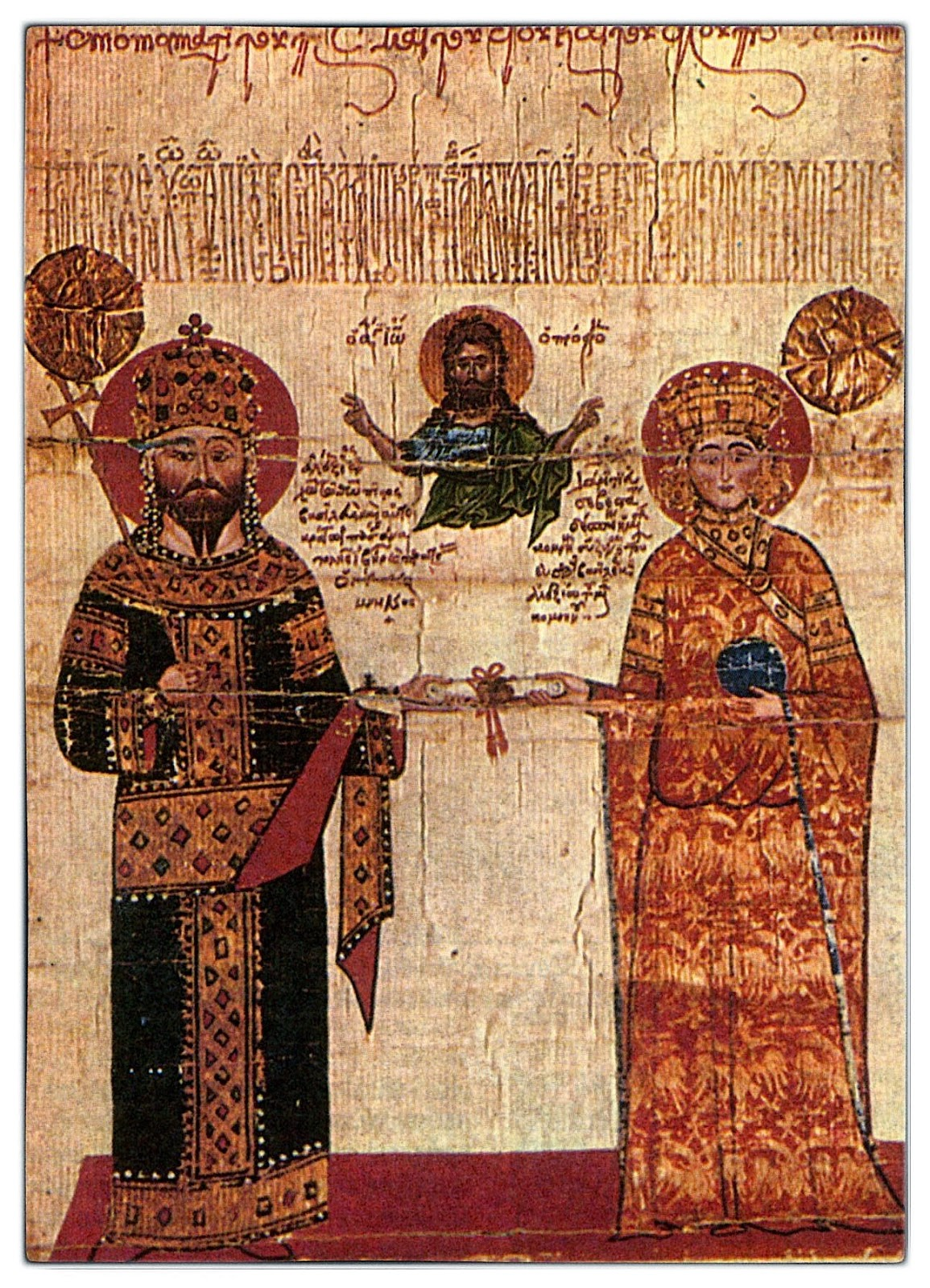
- Empress Theodora Kantakouzene with her husband, Emperor Alexios III of Trebizond, from a chrysobull to the Dionysiou monastery, mid-14th century.
- Born: c. 1340
- Died: after 1390
- Spouse: Alexios III of Trebizond
- Issue: Anna Megale Komnene, Basil Megas Komnenos, Manuel III Megas Komnenos, Eudokia Megale Komnene; Maria Megale Komnene; Two unnamed daughters
- Family: Kantakouzenos
- Dynasty: Grand Komnenos
- Father: Nikephoros Kantakouzenos
- Mother: unknown

Theodora Komnene Kantakouzene (Greek: Θεοδώρα Κομνηνή Καντακουζηνή; (Note: Theodṓra Komnēnḗ Kantakouzēnḗ) c. 1340 – after 1390) was Empress of the Empire of Trebizond as the consort of Emperor Alexios III Megas Komnenos from their marriage in 1351 until her retirement after her husband's death in 1390.

== Family ==
Theodora is considered a daughter of Nikephoros Kantakouzenos, sebastokratōr. According to the history of their kinsman John VI Kantakouzenos, Nikephoros was imprisoned by orders of Alexios Apokaukos, one of the main advisors of Anna of Savoy in the civil war against John VI, in 1341. Nikephoros was later released and recorded as governing Adrianople in the 1350s, having been made sebastokrator. Donald Nicol argues that Nikephoros is a cousin of the Emperor John VI. The identity of Theodora's mother is unknown.

== Marriage ==
When the deposed Emperor of Trebizond Michael was sent, after a period of incarceration, to Constantinople, he was accompanied by the tatas Michael Sampson, who was tasked to find a suitable wife for the new ruler, Alexios III. Donald Nicol presumes that the Byzantine Emperor John VI directed the search, "for the wife found was his cousin's daughter." She reached Trebizond on 3 September 1351, and on 28 September, she married Alexios. They were married in the newly rebuilt Hagios Eugenios Church. Her new husband was about a week short of his thirteenth birthday; Theodora is considered likely to have been of an equivalent age.

What is known about her life as empress is mostly based on the chronicle of Michael Panaretos, which is always terse. His chronicle mentions Theodora by name six times, including the record of her marriage and death; she is mentioned twice more by only her title of despoina; and for the notices of the births of the two sons of Alexios, her name is omitted. She accompanied Alexios when he marched on John Tzanitches and quashed his revolt in March 1352; she accompanied both Alexios and his mother Irene when he sailed against the rebel megas Doux Niketas Scholares in 1355; she accompanied both again when they fled an outbreak of the Black Death in Trebizond in March 1362; and she attended the wedding of her daughter Anna with both Alexios and his mother in June 1367. Panaretos' only notice of Theodora which can not be explained as part of her role as wife or Empress is her surprising participation in the funeral procession for the illegitimate son of Alexios, Andronikos, along with her rival, his mother; Andronikos had died under suspicious circumstances after falling from the citadel 14 March 1376.

Alexios died on 20 March 1390. Theodora survived him, retiring to a monastery in Constantinople. She is likely the nun "Theodosia Kantakouzene" the Patriarch Matthew I described as "the late Empress of the East" in a document dated June 1400 concerning money the nun had bequeathed to build a xenon or hospice in the city.

They had seven children:

- Anna (1357 - after 1406), who married King Bagrat V of Georgia
- Basil (September 1358–1377)
- Manuel III (1364–1417), Emperor 1390–1416. Married Gulkhan-Eudokia of Georgia.
- Eudokia, who married Tajeddin, Emir of Limnia on 8 October 1379
- Maria, who married Suleyman Beg, Emir of Chalybia,
- An unnamed daughter, who married Mutahharten, Emir of Erzincan
- A second unnamed daughter, who married Qara Osman, chieftain of the Aq Qoyunlu

Portraits of her and her husband Alexios can be seen on two chrysobulls: one that endows the Dionysiou monastery at Mount Athos, dated September 1374; and one for Soumela Monastery outside of Trebizond, dated December 1364. A portrait of Theodora and Alexios was painted on a wall of the Panagia Khrysokephalos Church in Trebizond, but was destroyed sometime after C. Texier made a drawing of it in the 1860s.

== Sources ==
- Nicol, Donald M. (1968). The Byzantine Family of Kantakouzenos (Cantacuzenus), ca. 1100–1460: A Genealogical and Prosopographical Study. Dumbarton Oaks studies 11. Washington, DC: Dumbarton Oaks Center for Byzantine Studies.

Royal titles
Preceded by Acropolitissa	Empress consort of Trebizond; 1351–1390	Succeeded by Gulkhan-Eudokia of Georgia
