= Constantine Loukites =

Byzantine poet

Constantine Loukites was a Byzantine poet of Chaldian origin and court official of the Empire of Trebizond in the early 14th century. He served as protonotarios and protovestiarios for Emperor Alexios II, which made him effectively Alexios' prime minister.

== Life ==
The date of Loukites' birth is not known, although a marginal note states he came from Macedonia. He received his education in Constantinople; his teachers included Theodore Hyrtakenos. By 1301 he had arrived in Trebizond, for in November of that year he escorted emperor Alexios II in the campaign against the "Amitiotai", Turkomans from Diyarbakır (Amida), who had penetrated deep into Trebizond's territory to sack Kerasous (modern Giresun), the second most important city of the Empire.

One important relationship Loukites developed while living in Trebizond was with the astronomer Gregory Choniades: of Choniades' 16 surviving letters, four were to Loukites. Two surviving manuscripts, one a copy of the Iliad (Ambros. I 58 sup.) the other a copy of Thucydides (Vatican. Ottob. gr. 211), that had been part of Choniades' library, also bear Loukites' bookplates.

Loukites maintained a high position in the Imperial court into the reign of Emperor Basil; the latest evidence that he was still alive is a letter Nikephoros Gregoras wrote to him, dated between 1335 and 1340. His funerary inscription is reportedly in the Hagia Sophia of Trebizond, on the eastern side of the church in the arch behind the sanctum.

== Writings ==
Two of his works have survived:

- An encomium to Saint Eugenios the patron saint of Trebizond, whose cult had been promoted during the rule of the Grand Komnenoi.
- A funeral oration for Alexios II Komnenos, which Loukites delivered nine days after Alexios' death on 3 May 1330. In that speech, Loukites mentions all but two of the ancestors of Alexios II, asking them to accept the late emperor among their ranks; the order and selection has led some writers to believe he was describing a series of portraits painted on the walls of the hall where Loukites delivered the oration. Athanasios Papadopoulos-Kerameus published an edition of this work in his Analekta Hierosolymitikes Stachyologias (St. Petersburg, 1891).
