= Manuel III of Trebizond =

Emperor of Trebizond from 1390 to 1417

Manuel III Megas Komnenos
- Emperor and Autocrat of all the East and Perateia
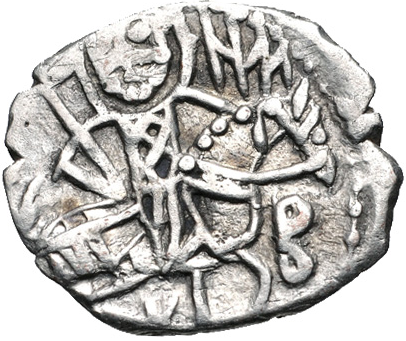
- Coin of Manuel III, depicting him on horseback

Emperor of Trebizond
- Reign: 20 March 1390 – 5 March 1417
- Predecessor: Alexios III
- Successor: Alexios IV
- Born: 16 December 1364
- Died: 5 March 1417 (aged 52)
- Spouse: Eudokia of Georgia; Anna Philanthropene
- Issue: Alexios IV Megas Komnenos
- Dynasty: Komnenos
- Father: Alexios III Megas Komnenos
- Mother: Theodora Kantakouzene

Manuel III Megas Komnenos (Greek: Μανουὴλ Μέγας Κομνηνός; 16 December 1364 – 5 March 1417) was Emperor of Trebizond from 20 March, 1390 to his death in 1417.

The major event of Manuel's reign was the arrival of the Central Asian conqueror Tamerlane to Anatolia. This led to the virtual destruction of the Ottoman Empire, which had threatened the existence of Manuel's domain, in the Battle of Ankara. Although the Ottomans reconstituted their state after 10 years of civil war, this defeat extended the life and security of the Empire of Trebizond for several more decades.

== Life ==
Manuel was the son of Emperor Alexios III of Trebizond by Theodora Kantakouzene. He was made heir apparent in 1377, after the death of his elder brother Basil.

Manuel's domain had come under the growing threat of the ruler of the Ottoman Empire, Sultan Bayezid I, who in 1398 had led his army along the Black Sea coast as far as the border of the Empire of Trebizond. Tamerlane, who had campaigned in eastern Anatolia in 1394, returned and captured Sivas (27 August 1400), slaughtering all of its defenders. Tamerlane demanded that Manuel and his army join him in the coming war with the Ottoman Turks, but somehow the Emperor avoided this demand, although he did contribute twenty galleys to Tamerlane's general effort. Bayezid and Tamerlane finally met in the Battle of Ankara, where Tamerlane crushed the Ottoman forces and made the Sultan his prisoner. For the next eight months Tamerlane moved about Anatolia, restoring the old Turkish beyliks and plundering Ottoman territories, thus dismantling the Ottoman Empire. It would not be until 1413, when Mehmet I defeated his last surviving brother, that the Ottoman Empire would once more be a threat to any of its neighbors.

When Tamerlane left Asia Minor in 1403, part of his army detached from the whole to visit the city of Kerasous and it was presumably by their ravages that the rule of Melissenos at Oinaion was destroyed. Only the mountains around Kerasous prevented them from venturing any further, much to the relief of the people of Trebizond. Tamerlane also put his nephew Mirza Halil in charge of the affairs of Armenia, Trebizond, and Georgia, but with his father's death in 1405 Halil rushed off to assume the throne at Samarkand.

The ambassador to Tamerlane Ruy Gonzáles de Clavijo was received by Manuel while passing through Trebizond in April 1404 and wrote the following of Manuel:

The Emperor and his son were dressed in imperial robes. They wore on their heads tall hats surmounted by golden cords, on the top of which were cranes' feathers; and the hats were bound with the skins of martens ... This Emperor pays tribute to Timur Beg, and to other Turks, who are his neighbours. He is married to a relation of the Emperor of Constantinople, and his son is married to the daughter of a knight of Constantinople, and has two little daughters.

Relations with Venice were better than with Genoa. In 1391 a pact was concluded, on the lines of the treaty of 1319, which reduced the dues Venice paid and confirmed the old privileges. In 1396 Manuel signed a golden bull at the insistence of the Venetian bailli, Gussoni, which allowed the Venetians to trade throughout his realm, granted them their own church, bank, and law court. Manuel sent a bell and clock to Venice to be repaired, and in 1416 a Trapezuntine embassy is recorded visiting that city. However, with Genoa was frequent strife. Manuel was accused of bribing the Genoese officials at Galata. In 1416 Genoa resolved to take steps against him for interference with their castle at Trebizond, which became so serious that the Venetians ordered their galleys to not land at Trebizond due to the "divisions existing between the Emperor and the Genoese".

The last years of Manuel's reign were clouded by discord with his own son Alexios IV, although the latter had been associated in authority as despotes. Manuel had for a time taken into his service a young man as his page. The favor shown to him, however, aroused the anger of the native aristocracy because of his humble birth so they poisoned the minds of the people against the page. At the same time, Alexios, covetous of the throne, raised the flag of revolt and demanded that the favorite be banished. The nobles joined him and besieged Manuel in the upper citadel, finally forcing him to concede and banish the favorite from the palace. The people then dispersed, but Alexios, who was still seeking the crown, was forced to reconcile with his father. The price of reconciliation was that Alexios take the young page into his service. Manuel III died in March 1417, and was succeeded by Alexios IV. George Finlay records the rumor that Alexios "was suspected of having hastened his father's death."

Manuel, "like his father, took an active interest in buildings of a religious nature. In the year of his succession he presented an ornate cross believed to contain a holy relic (stavrotheke), in this case a piece of the cross on which Jesus Christ was crucified, to the Soumela Monastery."

== Family ==
Manuel married Gulkhan-Eudokia of Georgia, the widow of his elder half-brother Andronikos and a daughter of King David IX of Georgia, in 1377. His second wife, whom he married in 1395, was Anna Philanthropene of the Byzantine Doukas family.

By Gulkhan-Eudokia, he had at least two sons:

- Alexios, who succeeded him as Emperor
- Theodore, who was the 6th generation ancestor of John Komnenos Molyvdos

According to Thierry Ganchou, Manuel had one son by his second wife Anna. Ganchou identifies him as the otherwise nameless Komnenos whom George Sphrantzes mentions in his history. This Komnenos had been the previous owner of the stallion Sphrantzes rode while campaigning in the Morea in 1429, and who married Eudokia the daughter of Manuel Palaiologos Kantakouzenos, but died before the couple could have children.

== Notes ==
Manuel III of Trebizond Komnenid dynasty Born: 16 December 1364 Died: 5 March 1417
Regnal titles
Preceded by Alexios III	Emperor of Trebizond; 1390–1417	Succeeded by Alexios IV
