= Eugenios of Trebizond =

Eastern Orthodox martyr and saint

Saint Eugenios of Trebizond
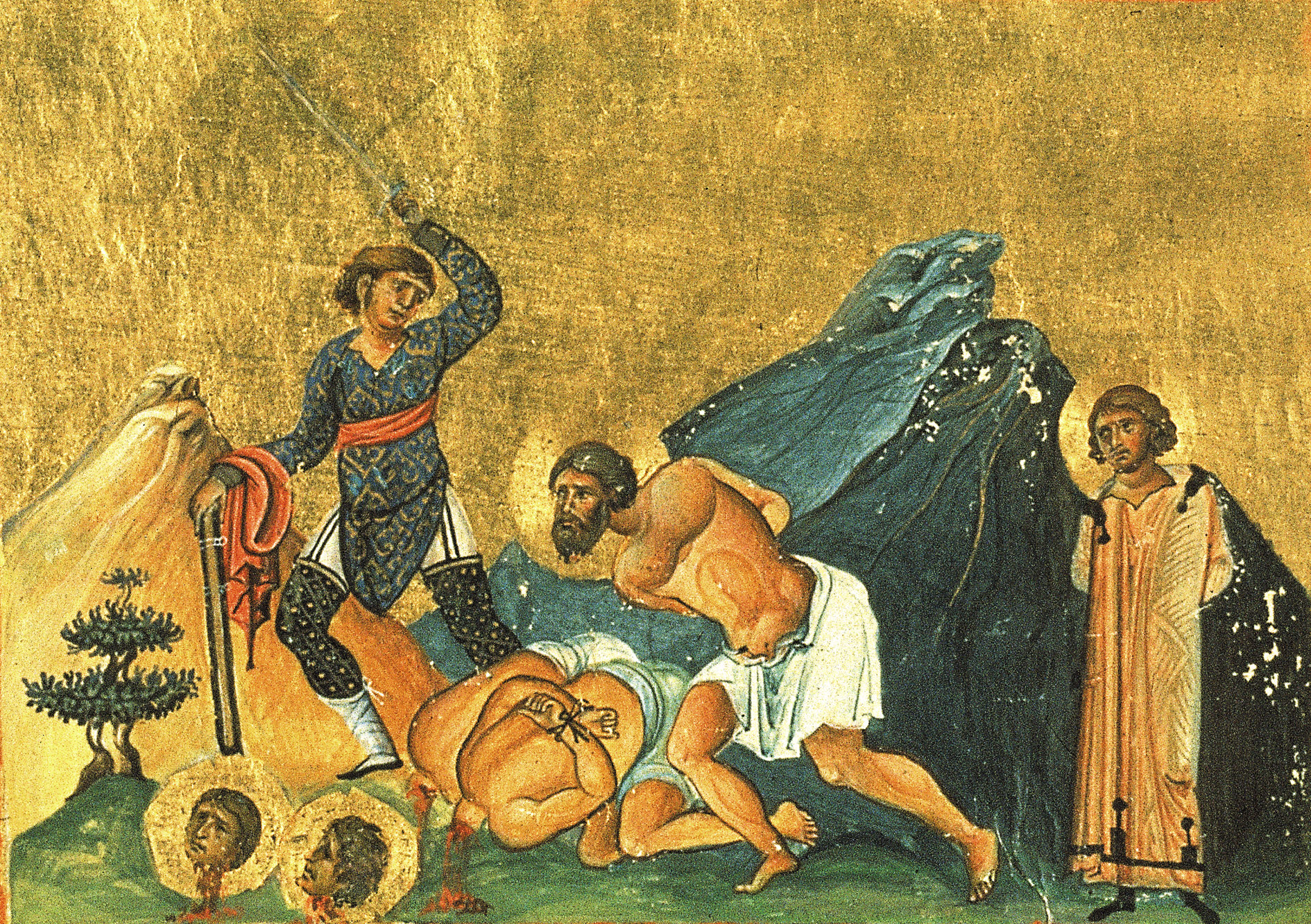
- Venerated in: Eastern Orthodox Church
- Feast: 21 January
- Patronage: Empire of Trebizond

Saint Eugenios (Greek: Άγιος Ευγένιος) or Eugenios of Trebizond was martyred under Diocletian and a cult devoted to him developed in Trebizond.

Eugenios along with the martyrs Candidus, Valerian and Aquila was persecuted during the reign of Diocletian (284-305) and Maximian (305-311). The four hid in the mountains above Trebizond, but were eventually found and brought before the regimental commander Lycius. They were flogged, tortured with fire and eventually beheaded. Eugenios is credited with the destruction of the image on the "gray hill" overlooking the city, later known as the Mithratis.

Their feast day is 21 January.

== Legacy ==
The Komnenian rulers of the Empire of Trebizond adopted the saint as the patron of their country. His alleged miracles include assisting Trebizond to repel a siege of the city by the Seljuk Turks in 1224. His image appears frequently on Trapezuntine coins. The cult and pilgrimage around this saint never really developed beyond Trebizond's borders, although John Lazaropoulos, Metropolitan of Trebizond in the name Joseph, collected the miracles of St. Eugenios into one book in the 14th century.

A monastery dedicated to him existed in Trebizond: Rosenqvist identifies it consisted of a structure on Mount Minthrion with an associated church, and a metochion inside the city walls. There is evidence that the monastery was in existence at least as early as the ninth century; a typikon composed in 1346 provides details of the monastic community's life.

According to the Orthodox Church in America, his prayer is thus:

Your holy martyr Eugene, O Lord, Through his sufferings has received an incorruptible crown from You, our God.
For having Your strength, he laid low his adversaries, And shattered the powerless boldness of demons.
Through his intercessions, save our souls!

== Bibliography ==
- Miller, William (1926). Trebizond: The Last Greek Empire of the Byzantine Era, 1204-1461. Argonaut Publishers.
- Rosenqvist, Jan Olof, ed. (1966). The Hagiographic Dossier of St Eugenios of Trebizond in Codex Athous Dionysiou 154. Uppsala. ISBN 9155437877.
