= Kalepark =

Fortress in Ortahisar District, Turkey

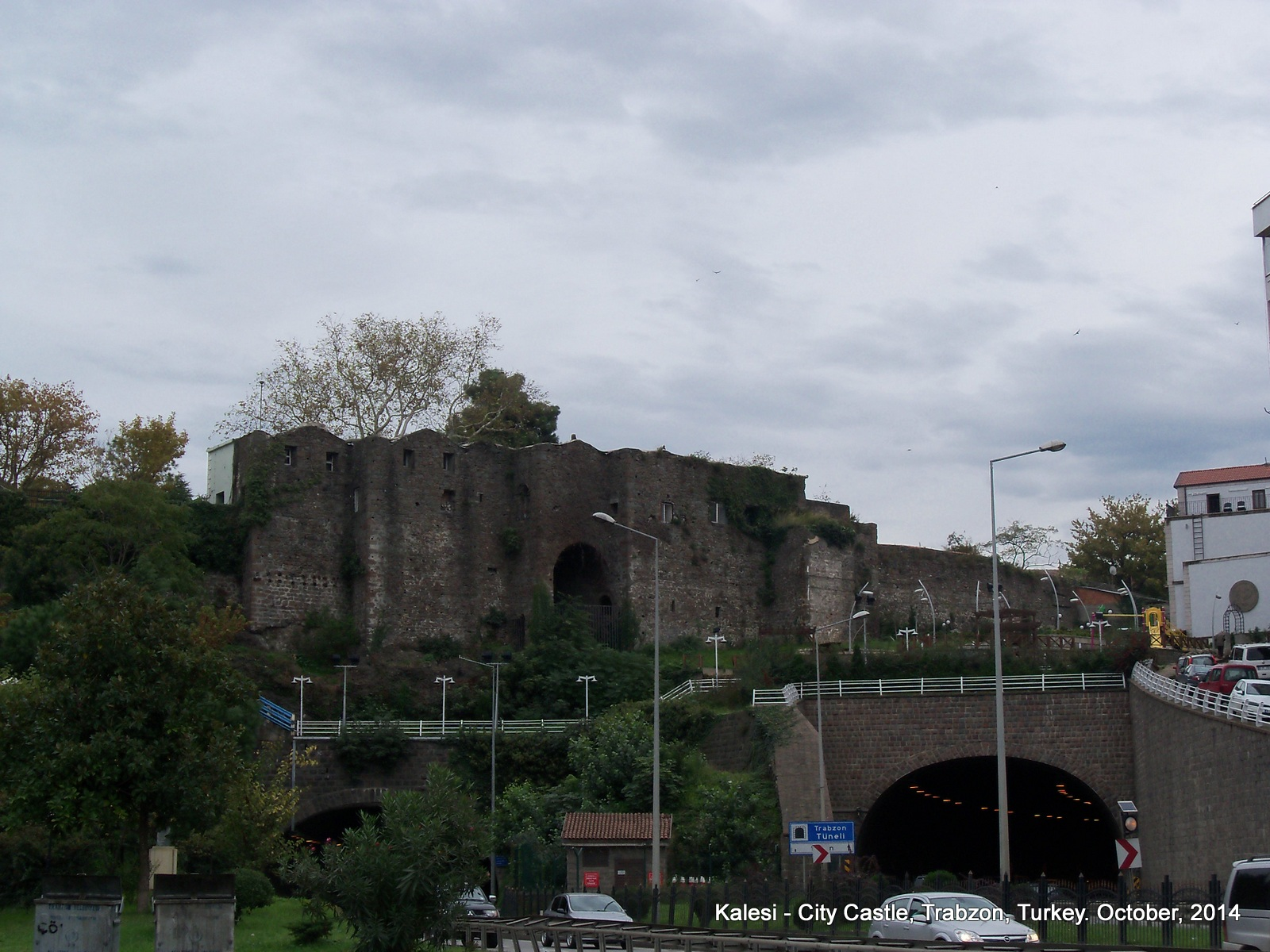
What remains today of the fortress.

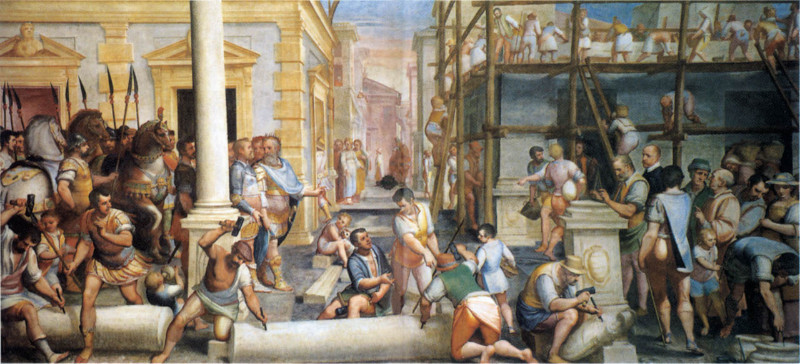
Construction of the warehouse of the Genoese in Trebizond (Leonkastron). Fantastical fresco by Luca Cambiasi, painted around 1571. Palazzo Lercari-Parodi in Genoa.

Kalepark (originally called Leonkastron; and later Güzelhisar, meaning "Beautiful Castle" in Turkish) was procured and further fortified by Genoese merchants as a medieval fortress on the east side of Trabzon, Turkey. The fortress was built on a rocky outcrop strategically overlooking both harbors of the city: the summer harbor at a distance to the west, and the winter harbor just to the east of it. A few hundred meters to the west of Leonkastron lay the "Venetian Castle", which was a competing fortified trading outpost. In the following centuries many other Europeans settled on the streets between these forts - such as traders from Lviv in Ukraine - and it thus became known as the "European quarter".

In the 1740s, a palace was built for the Ottoman Governor Ahmet Paşa at the same location, which was destroyed by a fire in 1790.

The castle was frequently shelled during World War I by the Russian naval forces, due to its easily accessible location near the Black Sea coast.

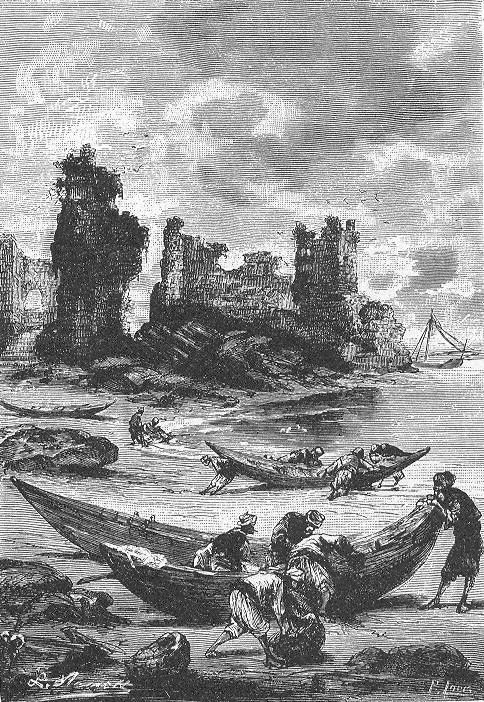
Kalepark as depicted in Kéraban the Inflexible by Jules Verne.

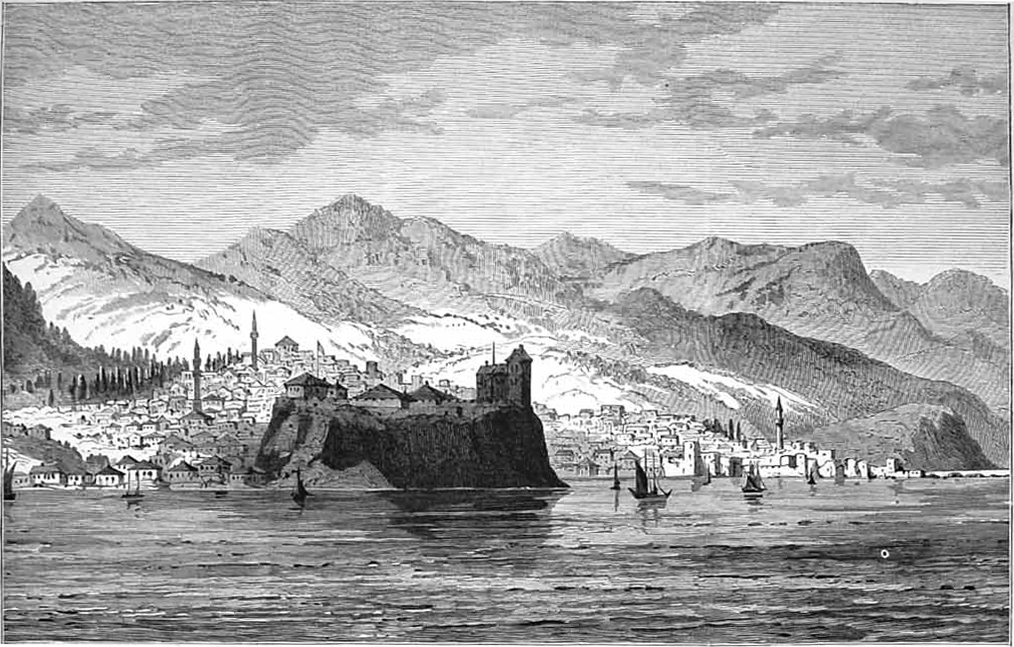
The Kalepark featured prominently in the 1895 Illustrated London News.

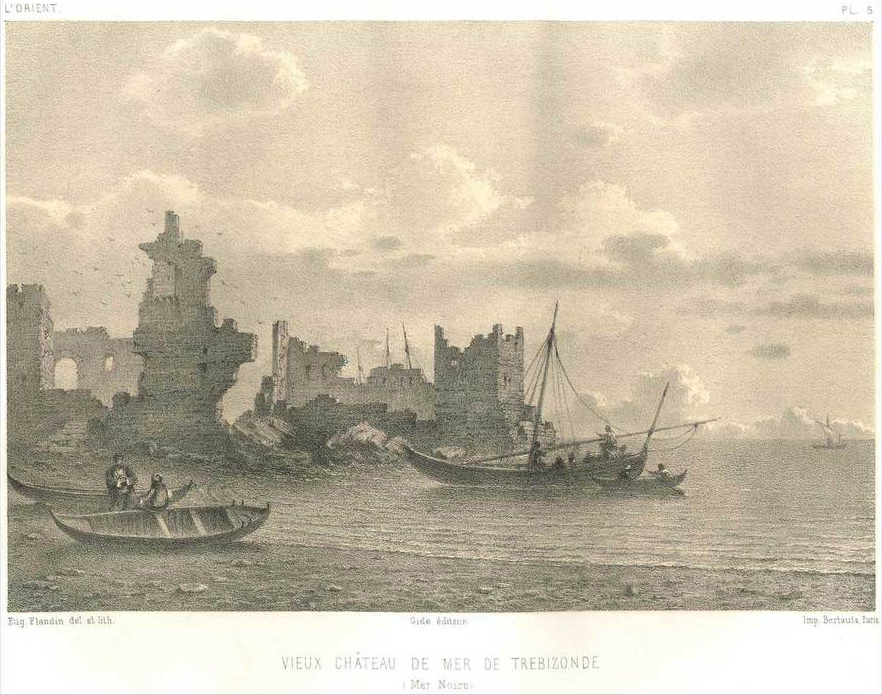
The Kalepark in ruins. Drawn by Eugène Flandin.
