= Sumela Monastery =

Greek Orthodox monastery and Tentative UNESCO World Heritage Site in Turkey

- Μονή Παναγίας Σουμελά; Sümela Manastırı
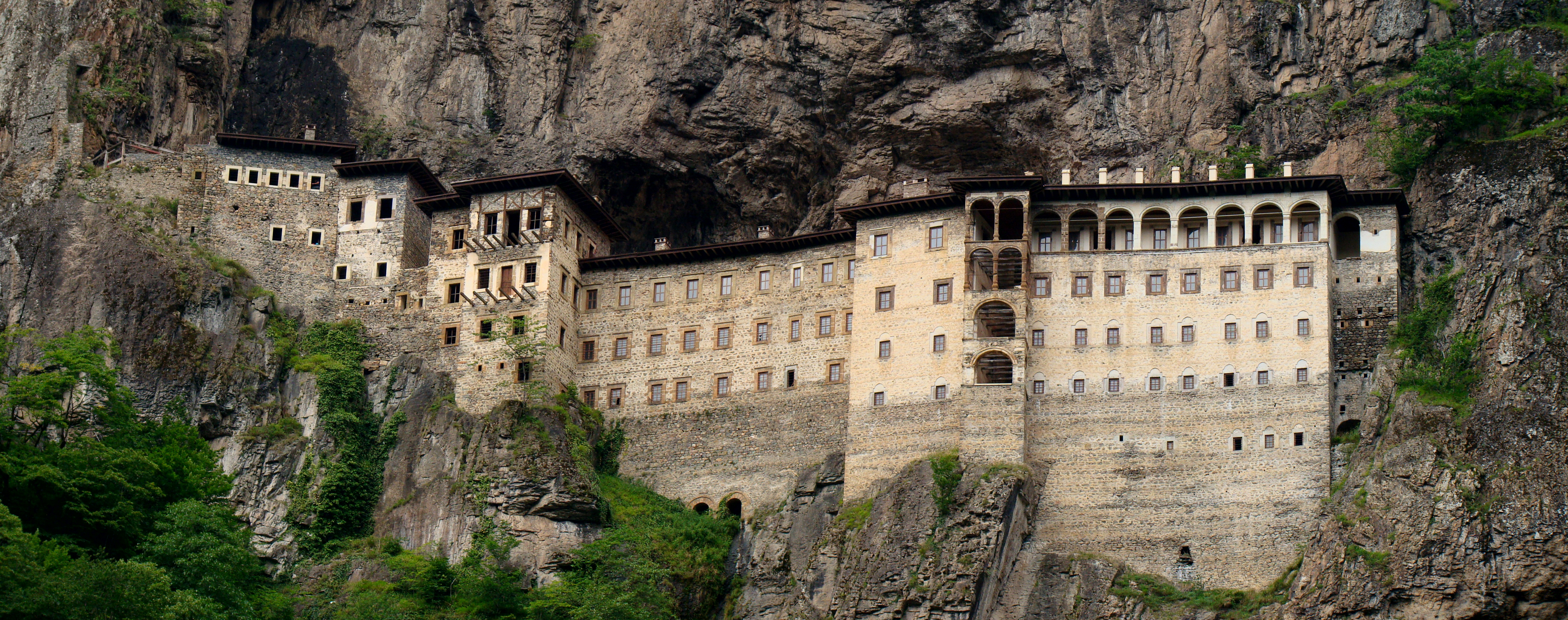
- View of Sumela monastery from across the valley

- Location within Turkey

Monastery information
- Established: c. 386 CE
- Disestablished: 1923

Architecture
- Status: Ruins
- Functional status: Tourist attraction
- Heritage designation: Tentative UNESCO World Heritage Site

Site
- Location: Maçka, Trabzon Province, Turkey
- Coordinates: 40°41′24″N 39°39′30″E
- Public access: Yes
- Website: www.sumela.gov.tr

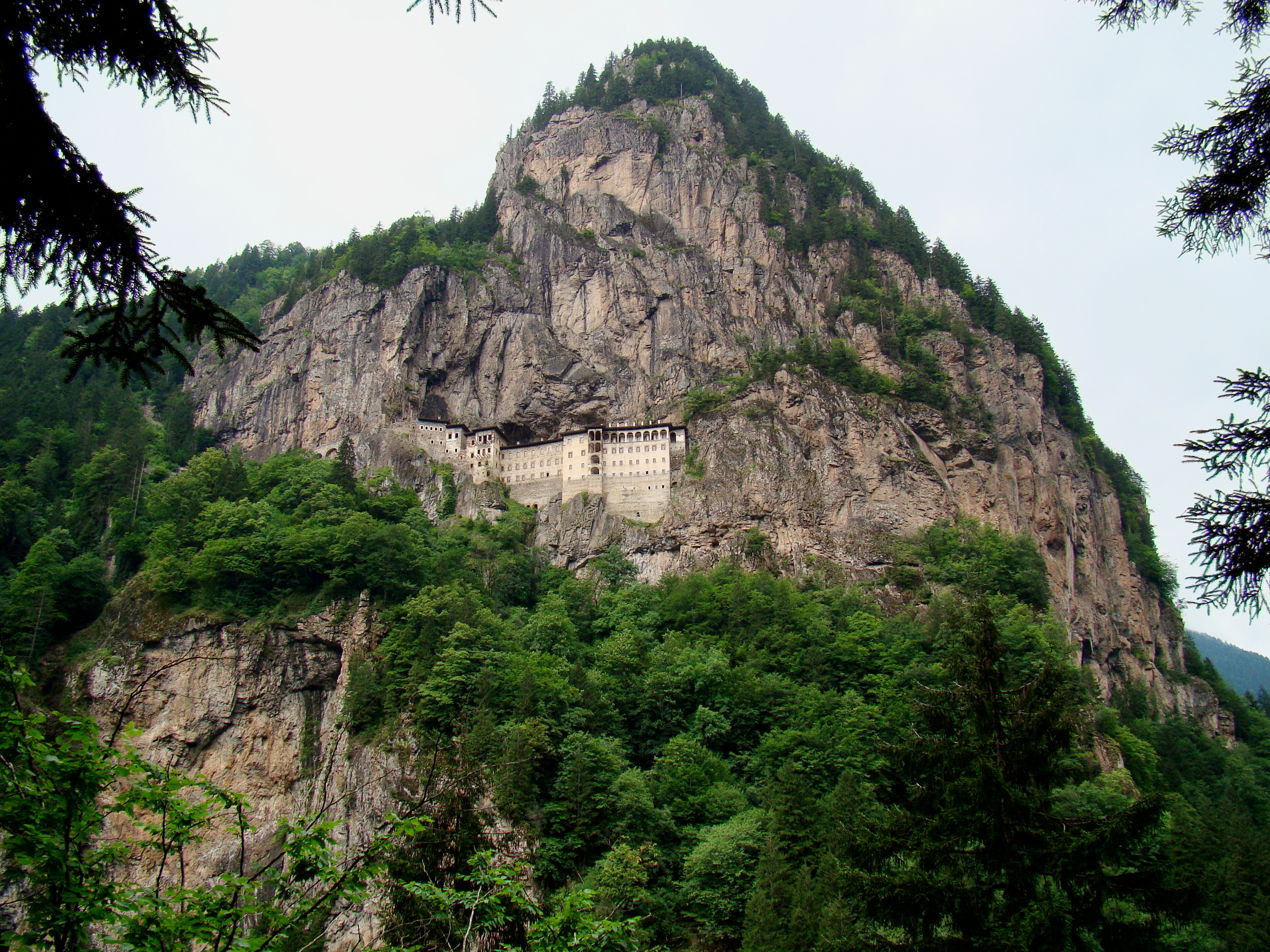
The monastery is on a ledge in a steep cliff

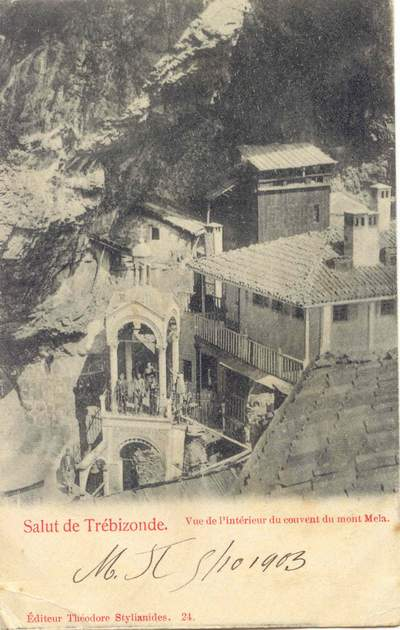
Sumela Monastery as illustrated in a postcard addressed in 1903

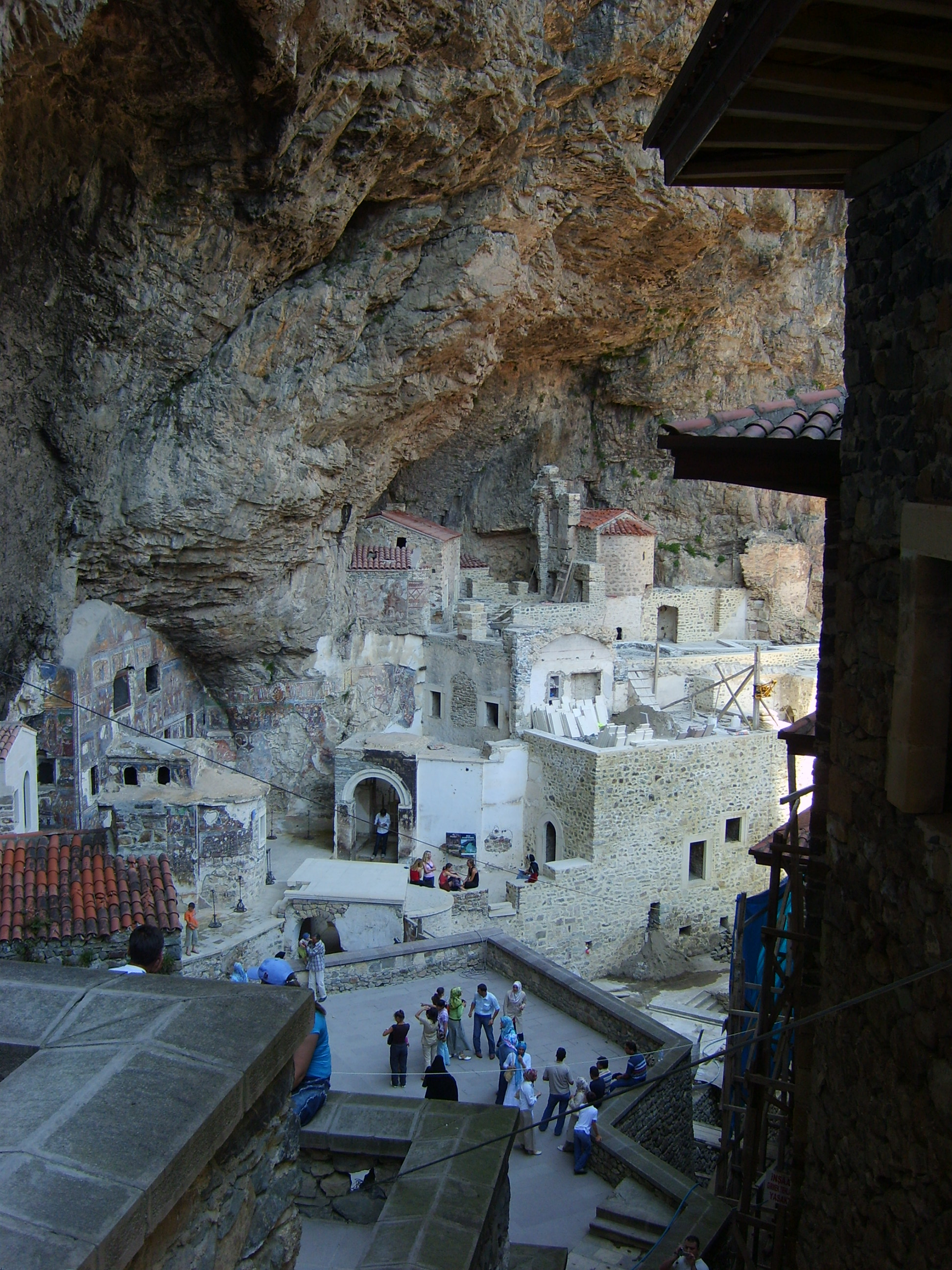
The "back yard" of the monastery in 2006

Sumela Monastery (Greek: Μονή Παναγίας Σουμελά, Moní Panagías Soumelá; Turkish: Sümela Manastırı) is a museum and former Greek Orthodox monastery in the Pontic Mountains, in the Maçka district of Trabzon province, Turkey. Dating back to ancient times, it was in use until the Greco-Turkish population exchange in 1923.

Nestled in a steep cliff at an elevation of about 1,200 metres (3,900 ft) facing the Altındere valley, it is a site of great historical and cultural significance, as well as a major tourist attraction within Altındere National Park. It was closed to the public for safety reasons in 2015, due to an increase in rock falls, but reopened in 2019.

== Etymology ==
According to one theory, the name derives from Pontic Greek Sou Mela, meaning "on Melas", this being the name of the mountain (literally meaning "black", in reference to the dark hue of the rock). Another theory is that the name comes from the Laz word for the Trinity, Sumela.

== History ==
It is not known when the monastery was founded, but the Turkish Ministry of Culture and Tourism places the date around AD 386, during the reign of the emperor Theodosius I (375–395 AD). According to William Miller, two Athenian monks named Barnabas and Sophronios founded the monastery. It became famous for an icon of the Theotokos known as the Panagia Gorgoepekoos, said to have been painted by the Apostle Luke.

During its long history, the monastery fell into ruin several times and was restored by various emperors. During the 6th century AD, it was restored and enlarged by the Byzantine general Belisarius at the behest of emperor Justinian.

It reached its present form in the 13th century, after gaining prominence during the existence of the Empire of Trebizond. While the emperors Basil and John II had endowed the monastery richly, it was during the reign of Alexios III (1349–1390) that Sumela received its most important largesse. According to legend, the young Alexios was saved from a storm by the Theotokos, and was bidden by her to restore the monastery. A chrysobull dated to 1365 confirms the freedom and autonomy of the monastery, together with all of its hereditary lands and dependents; exempts them from all taxes, except for one biannual tax; and likewise exempts any serfs settling on that land, listing 40 serfs by name. At that time, the monastery was granted an amount annually from imperial funds. During the time of Manuel III, son of Alexios III, and during the reigns of subsequent princes, Sumela gained further wealth from imperial grants.

Following the conquest of Trebizond by Ottoman Sultan Mehmed II in 1461, the monastery was granted the sultan's protection and given rights and privileges that were renewed by following sultans. The monastery remained a popular destination for monks and travelers through the years.

In 1682 and for the following decades, the monastery housed the Phrontisterion of Trapezous, a well-known Greek educational institution of the region.

=== Modern period ===
Until the end of the Russian occupation of Trabzon (1916–1918), the Sumela Monastery was active and was visited by monks and Christian and Muslim pilgrims. In 1923, the Ottoman Empire collapsed and after the National War of Liberation, an independent Turkish Republic was founded by Atatürk. After 1923, the Sumela Monastery was abandoned following the population exchange between Greece and Turkey as laid down in the Treaty of Lausanne. In 1930, those who migrated founded a new monastery which they named as the new Panagia Sumela Monastery on the slopes of Mount Vermion, near the village of Kastania near Veria, in Macedonia, Greece. Some treasures from the old Sumela Monastery were carried to the new one in Greece.

In 1930, the wooden parts of the Sumela Monastery were destroyed by fire and in the years following other parts of the monastery were damaged and pillaged by treasure hunters.

As of 25 May 2019 the Sumela Monastery is a museum open to visitors. Restoration work is funded by the Government of Turkey. As of 2012, the Turkish government is funding reconstruction work, and the monastery is enjoying a revival in pilgrimage from Greece, Georgia and Russia. The monastery's primary function is as a tourist attraction. It overlooks forests and streams, making it popular for its aesthetics as well as its cultural and religious significance.

On 15 August 2010, Orthodox divine liturgy was allowed to take place in the monastery compound. A special pass issued by the Ecumenical Patriarchate of Constantinople is required to visit on August 15, the day of the Dormition of the Theotokos or Feast of the Assumption, when a divine liturgy is held. Only 450 to 500 visitors are allowed inside the monastery, although widescreen televisions are available to observe the event at a nearby cafe.

On 22 September 2015, the Monastery was closed to visitors for three years due to necessary restoration and field work. It reopened on May 18, 2019.

In 2022, video footage showed modern music and dancing at the site. Amid outcry on the internet that the historic monastery was turned into a dance club, an explanation was given that this was done to promote tourism.

== Construction and buildings ==
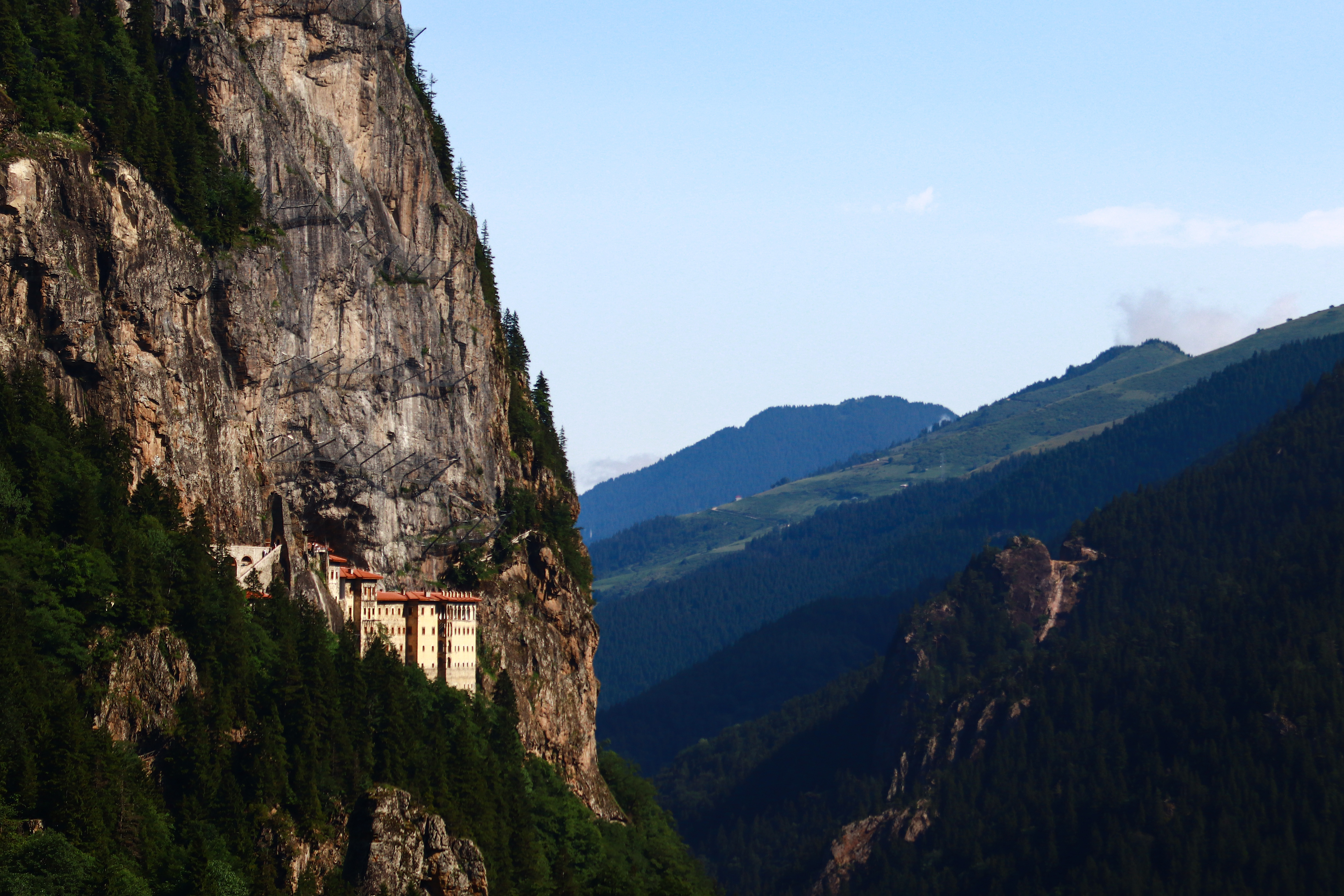
View of Sümela

The principal elements of the Monastery complex are the Rock Church, several chapels, kitchens, student rooms, a guesthouse, a library, and a sacred spring revered by Eastern Orthodox Christians.

The large aqueduct at the entrance, which supplied water to the Monastery, is constructed against the side of the cliff. The aqueduct has many arches which have mostly been restored. The entrance to the Monastery leads up a long and narrow stairway. There is a guard-room next to the entrance. The stairs lead down from there to the inner courtyard. On the left, in front of a cave, there are several monastery buildings. The cave, which was converted into a church, constitutes the center of the monastery. The library is to the right.

The large building with a balcony on the front part of the cliff was used for the monks' cells and for housing guests. It dates from 1840.

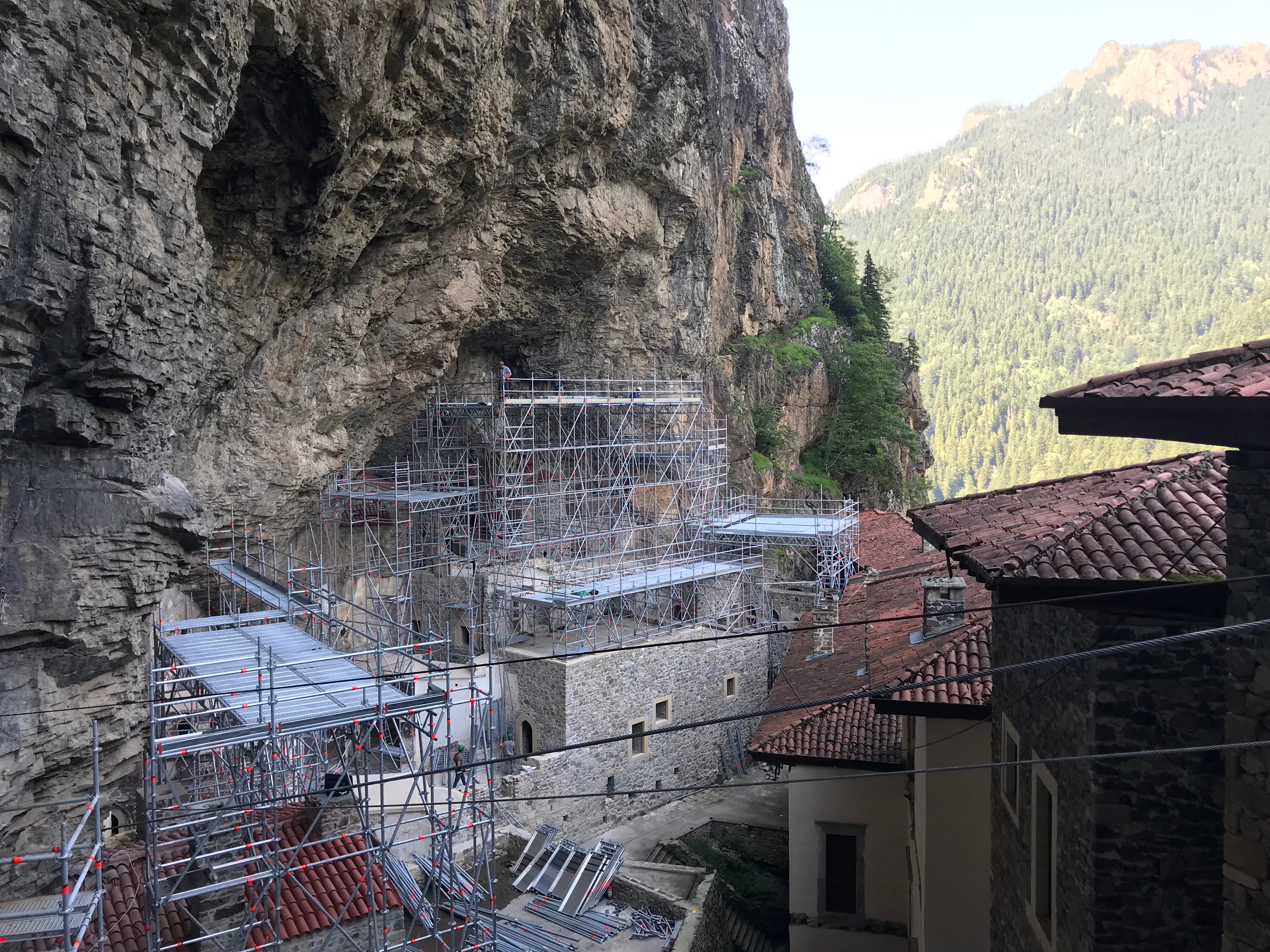
Restoration works in 2019

The inner and outer walls of the Rock Church and the walls of the adjacent chapel are decorated with frescoes. Frescoes dating from the era of Alexios III of Trebizond line the inner wall of the Rock Church facing the courtyard. The frescoes of the chapel which were painted on three levels in three different periods are dated to the beginning of the 18th century.

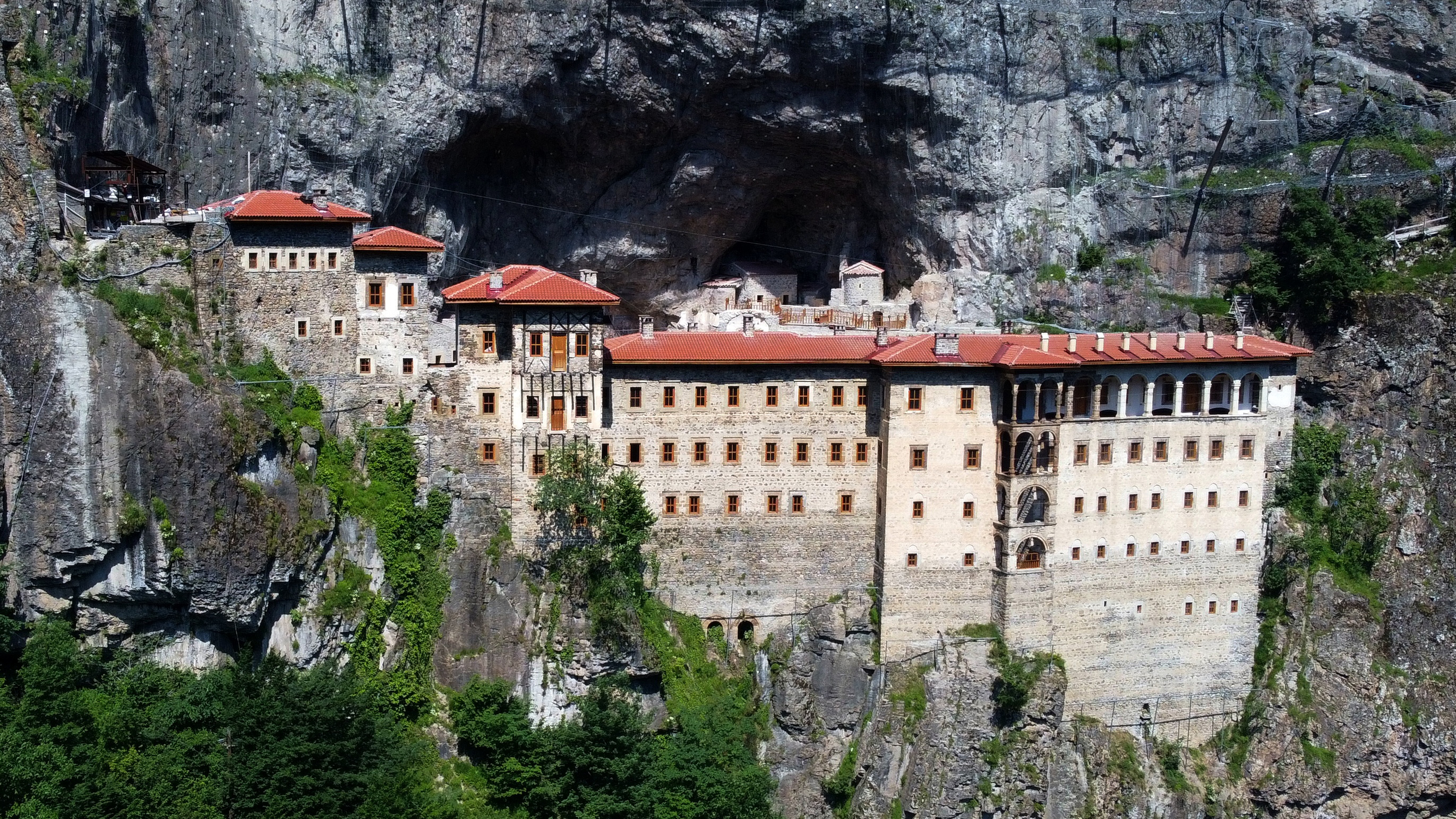
After restoration

The frescoes of the monastery are seriously damaged due to vandalism. The main subject of the frescoes are biblical scenes telling the story of Jesus and the Virgin Mary.

During the 2015–2017 restoration works, a secret tunnel was discovered which lead to a place which is believed to have served as a temple or chapel for Christians. Also, unseen frescoes were discovered depicting heaven and hell as well as life and death.

== Restoration interventions ==
Before starting the practical restoration works, a detailed study phase was carried out by a multidisciplinary team. This team included geologists, architects, engineers, and art historians. They collaborated to conduct site surveys, measurements, and material analyses. They examined the condition of the structure, the risk of rock falls, the state of the frescoes, and the general safety conditions for visitors. The Ministry of Culture and Tourism was in charge of coordinating the whole process. One of the first priorities was to eliminate the physical danger coming from the unstable rocks above the monastery. Because the terrain was extremely difficult to reach with normal tools, some special methods were used, including helicopter assistance, which made the intervention more manageable even if it was quite expensive and complicated.

One of the biggest interventions was rock stabilization. The rocks above the monastery were in dangerous condition. So, they put metal nets, anchors, and also cleaned the rocks that could fall. This was very important, because otherwise all the work would be dangerous and could be lost again after few years. The scaffolding was also specially designed, because the place is narrow and steep. The workers needed to use ropes and climbing techniques in some parts.

The monastery's roofs, windows, doors, and walls were restored with traditional materials. They used wooden elements and stone compatible with the original ones. In some places, the original materials were re-used. When replacement was necessary, new materials were added in a distinguishable way, so people can understand which parts are historical and which ones are new.

Inside the monastery, the frescoes were in particularly bad condition. There were cracks, losses, graffiti, and smoke on them. The conservators cleaned the surfaces carefully using brushes, water, and soft materials. In some areas, they did reintegration to bring back the visibility of the figures and motifs, but they avoided repainting the whole surface. In some places, they did reintegration to make the image visible.

== Protection rules ==
Sumela Monastery is protected under Turkish national heritage laws. The site was first registered as a 1st degree archaeological site in 1972 by the Ministry of Culture and Tourism. This means that the building and its natural environment are protected and it is forbidden to build anything new or change existing structures without legal permission. All the interventions must be approved by the Regional Conservation Board.

In 2000, Sumela Monastery entered the UNESCO Tentative List. This means the monastery has potential to become a World Heritage Site, but it's not fully accepted. Being on the list helps to bring attention and makes the government work for more protection. Also Sumela is inside the borders of Altindere National Park, the area is under environmental protections. Building new roads or parking areas close to the monastery is not allowed without permissions. Day by day new legal updates try to ensure minimum intervention and better control.

== Gallery ==
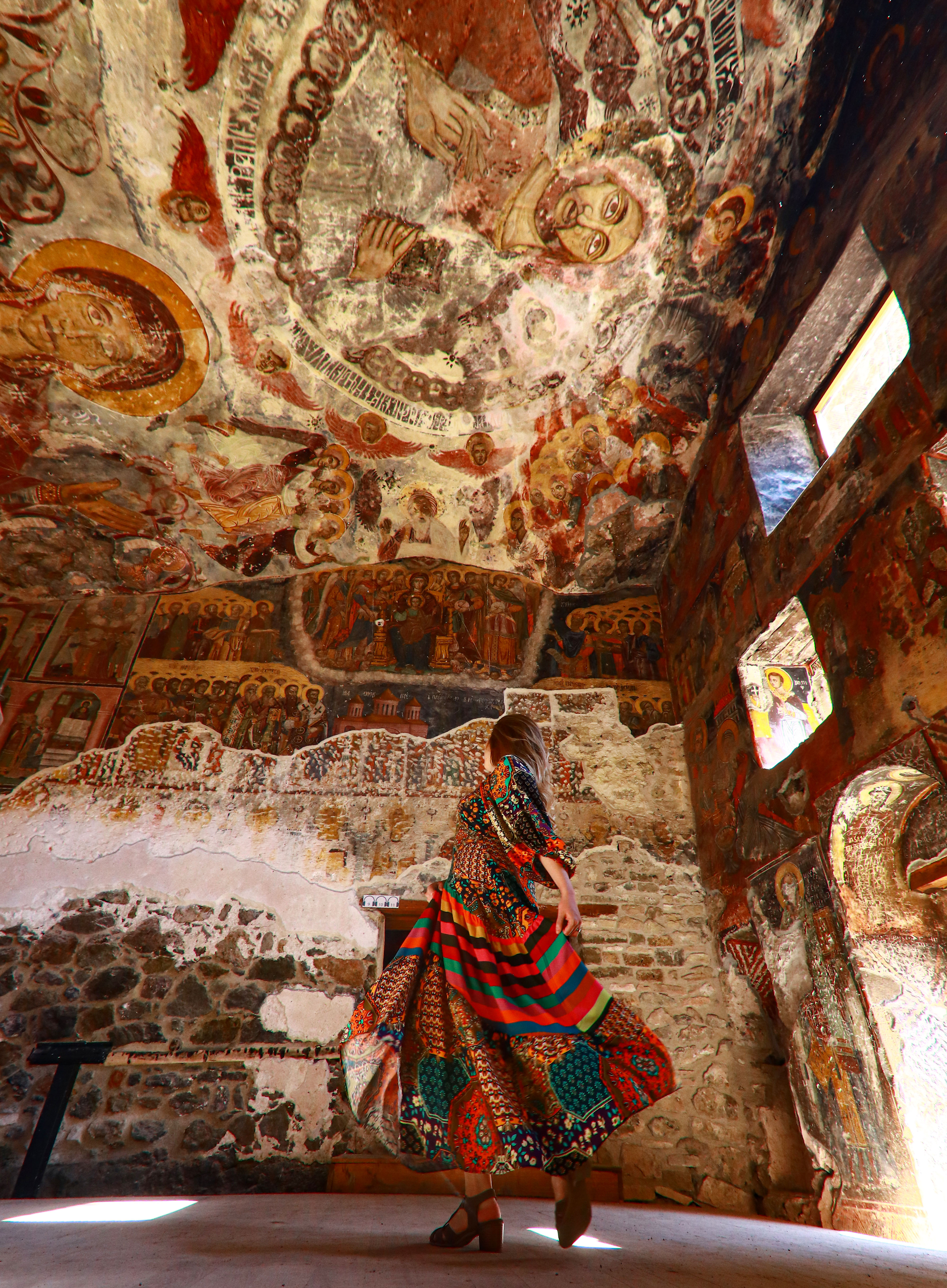
Sümela

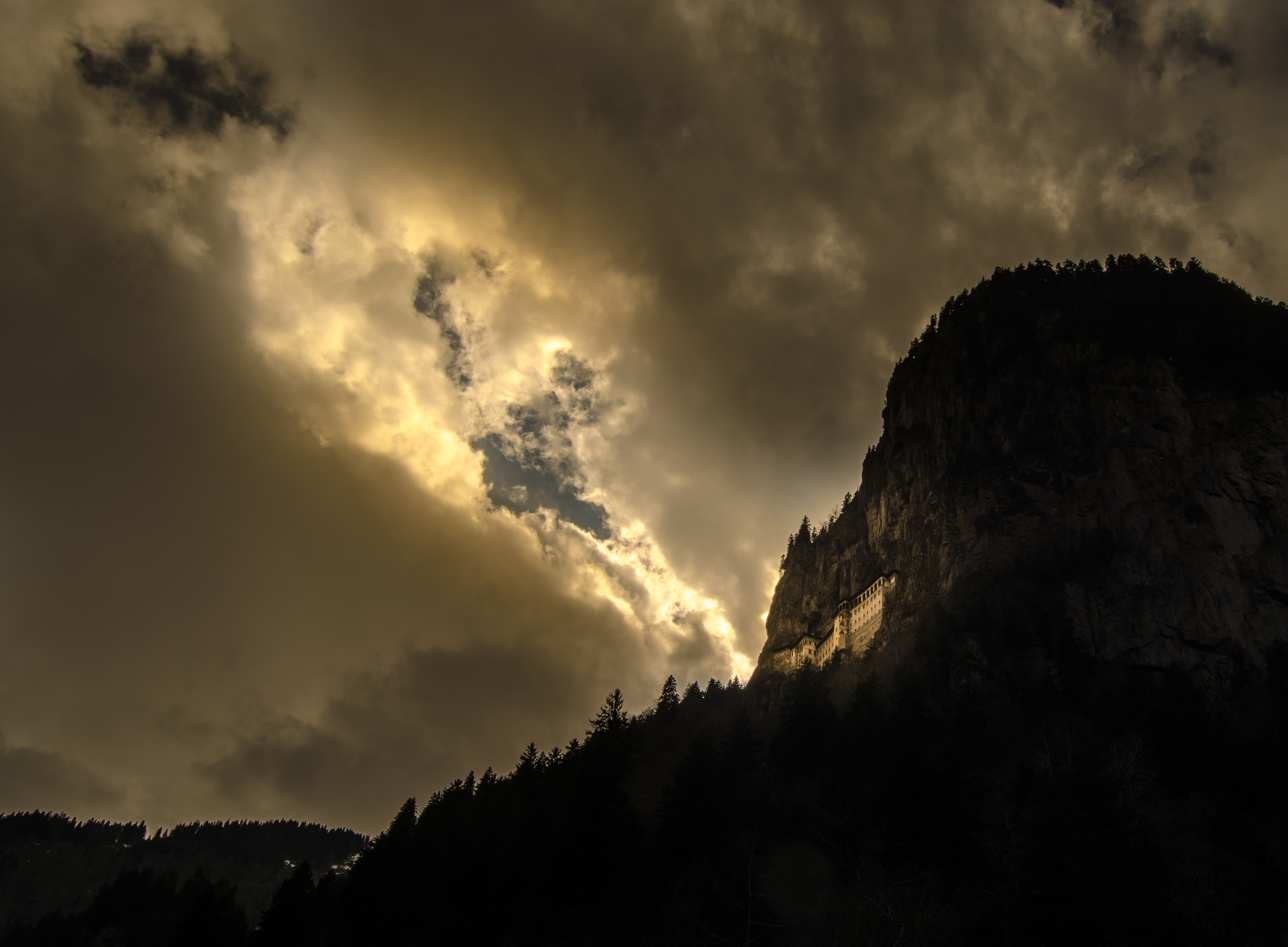

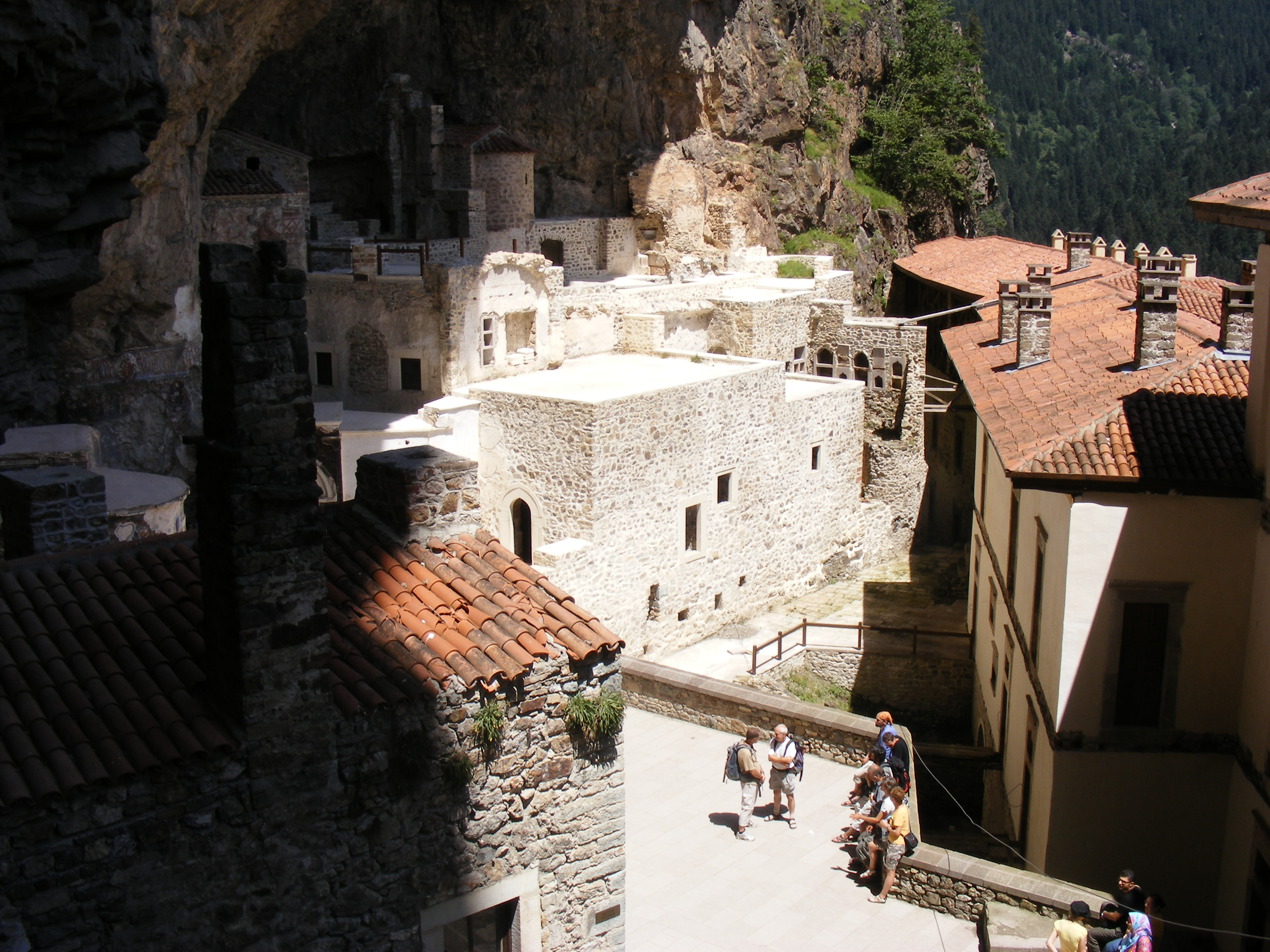
Interior

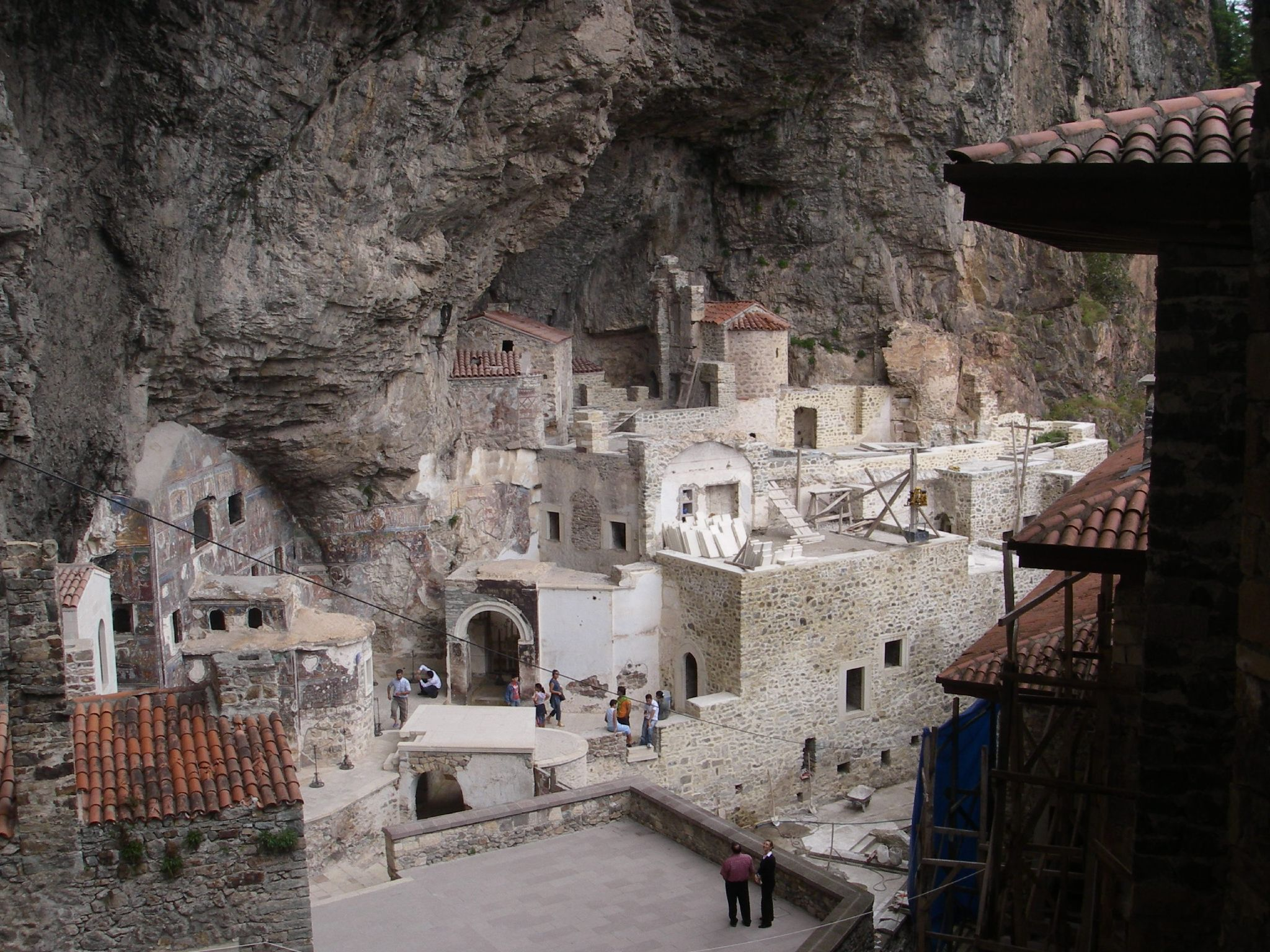

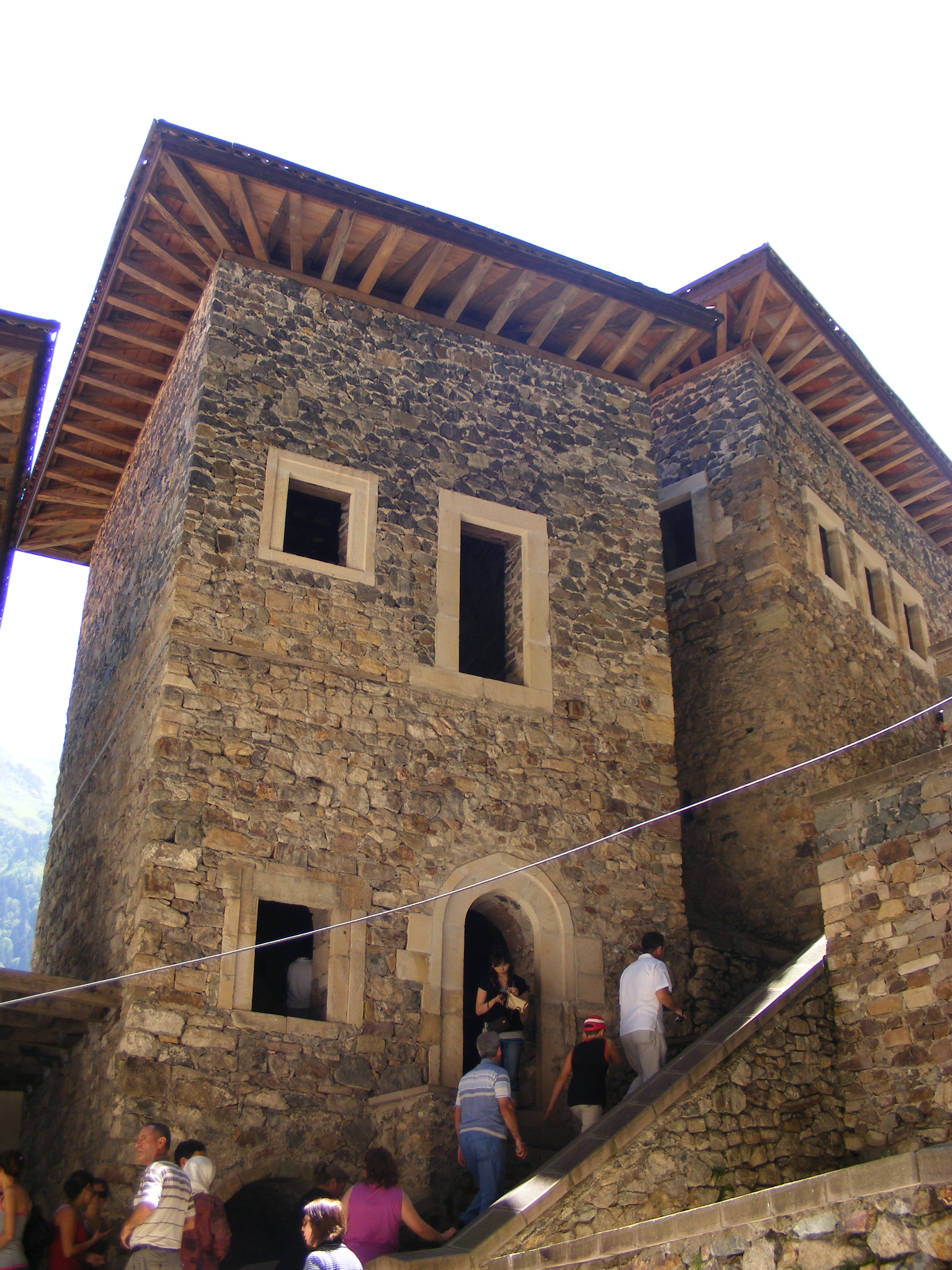

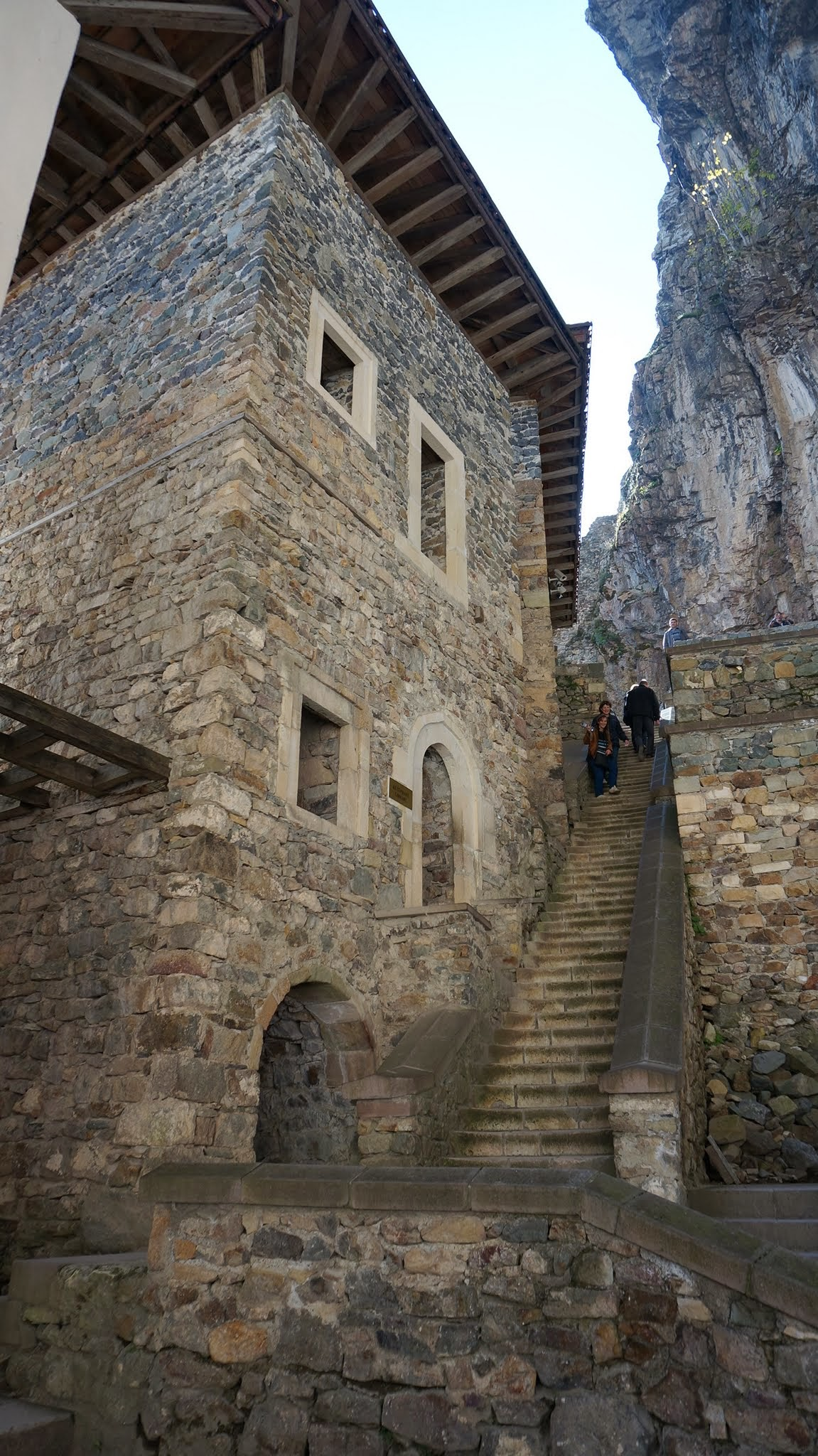

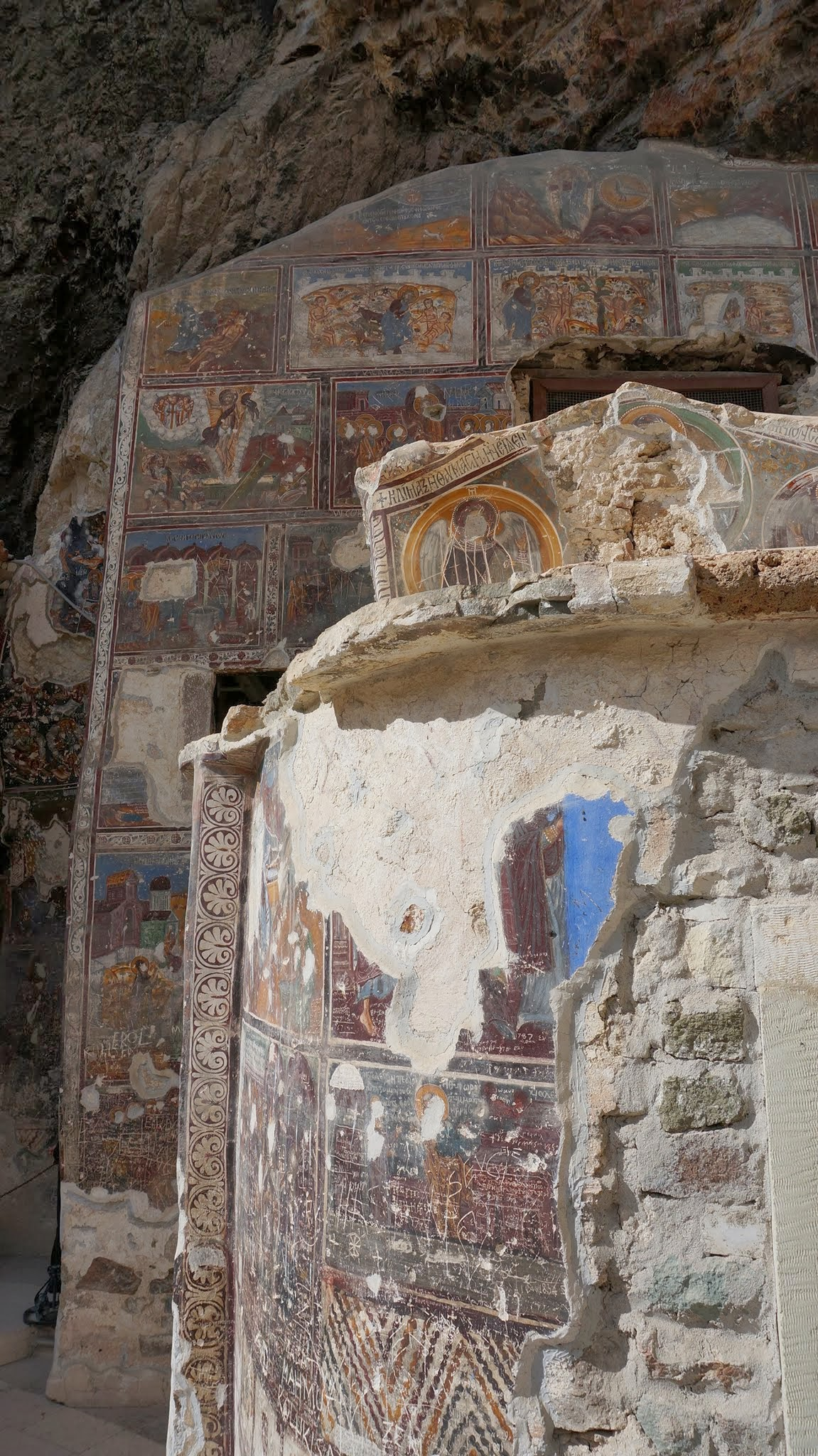

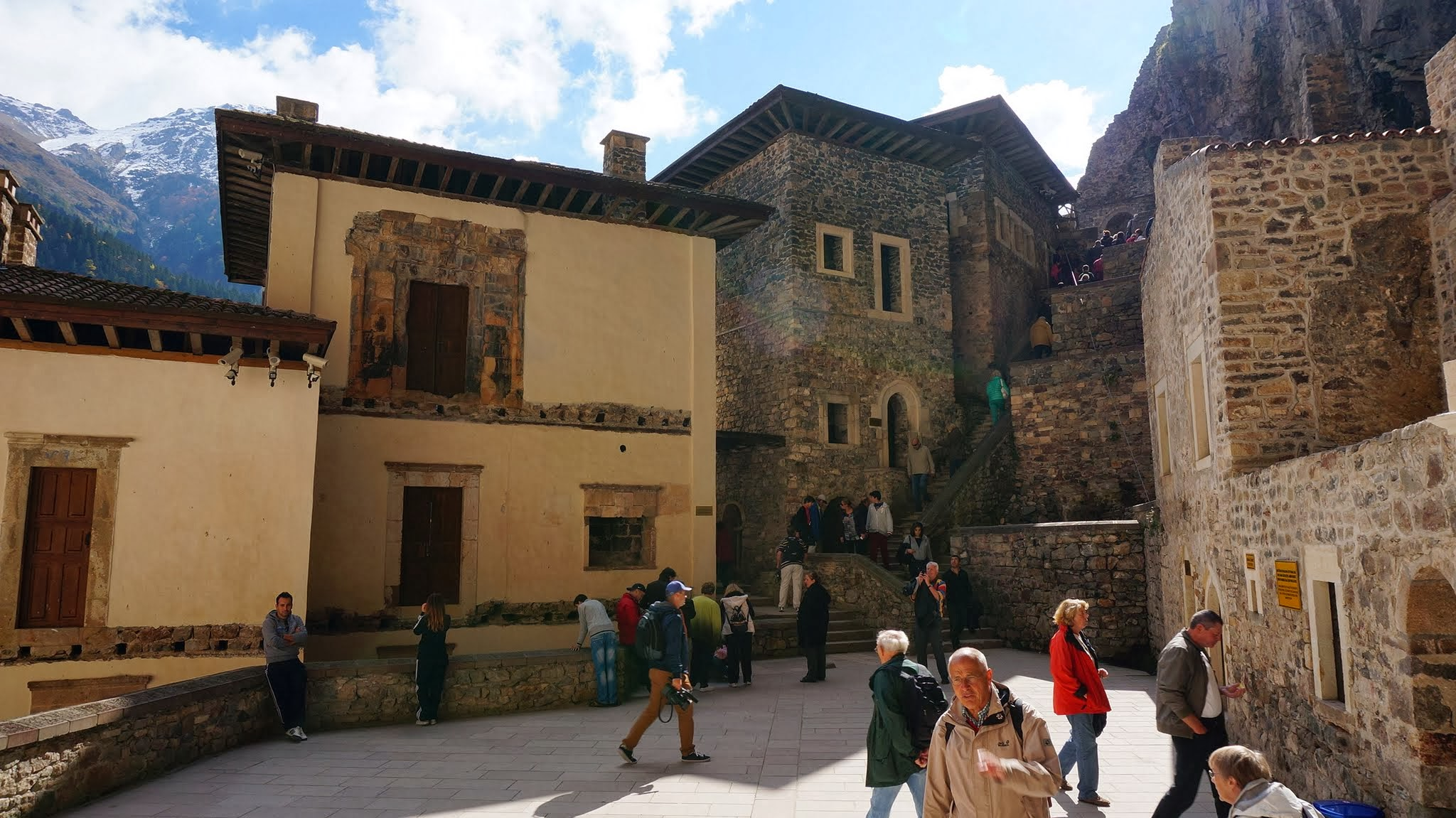

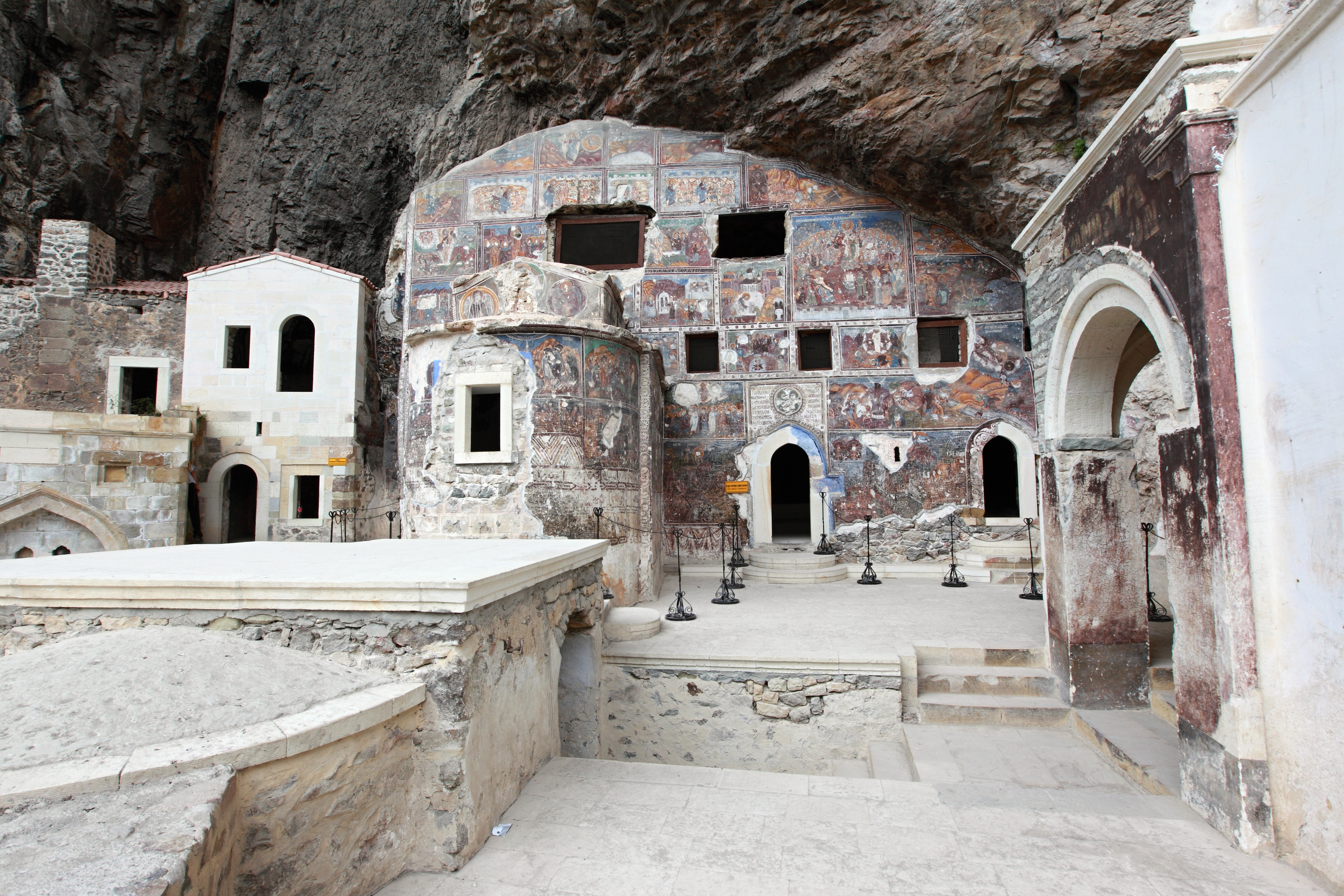

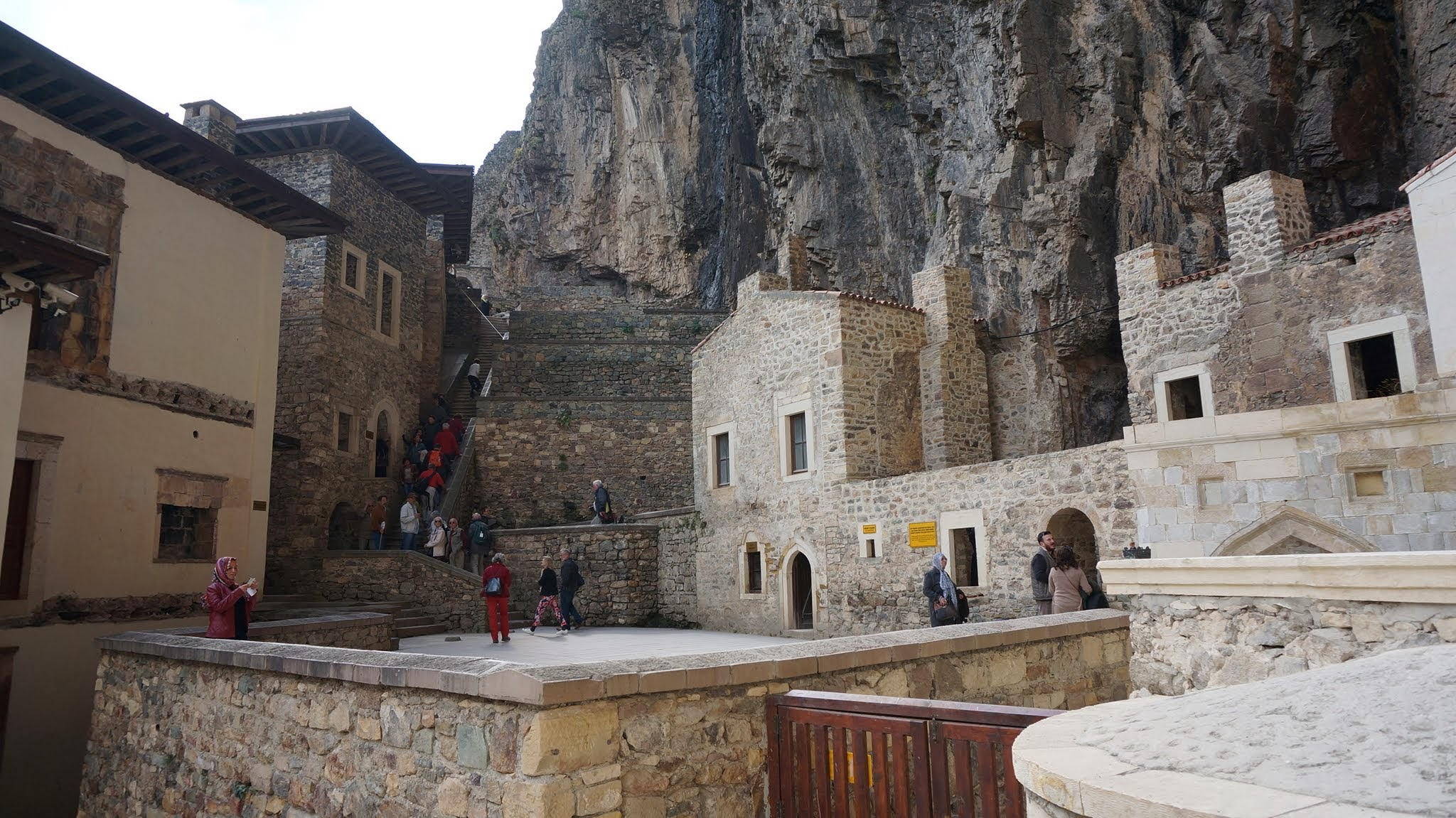

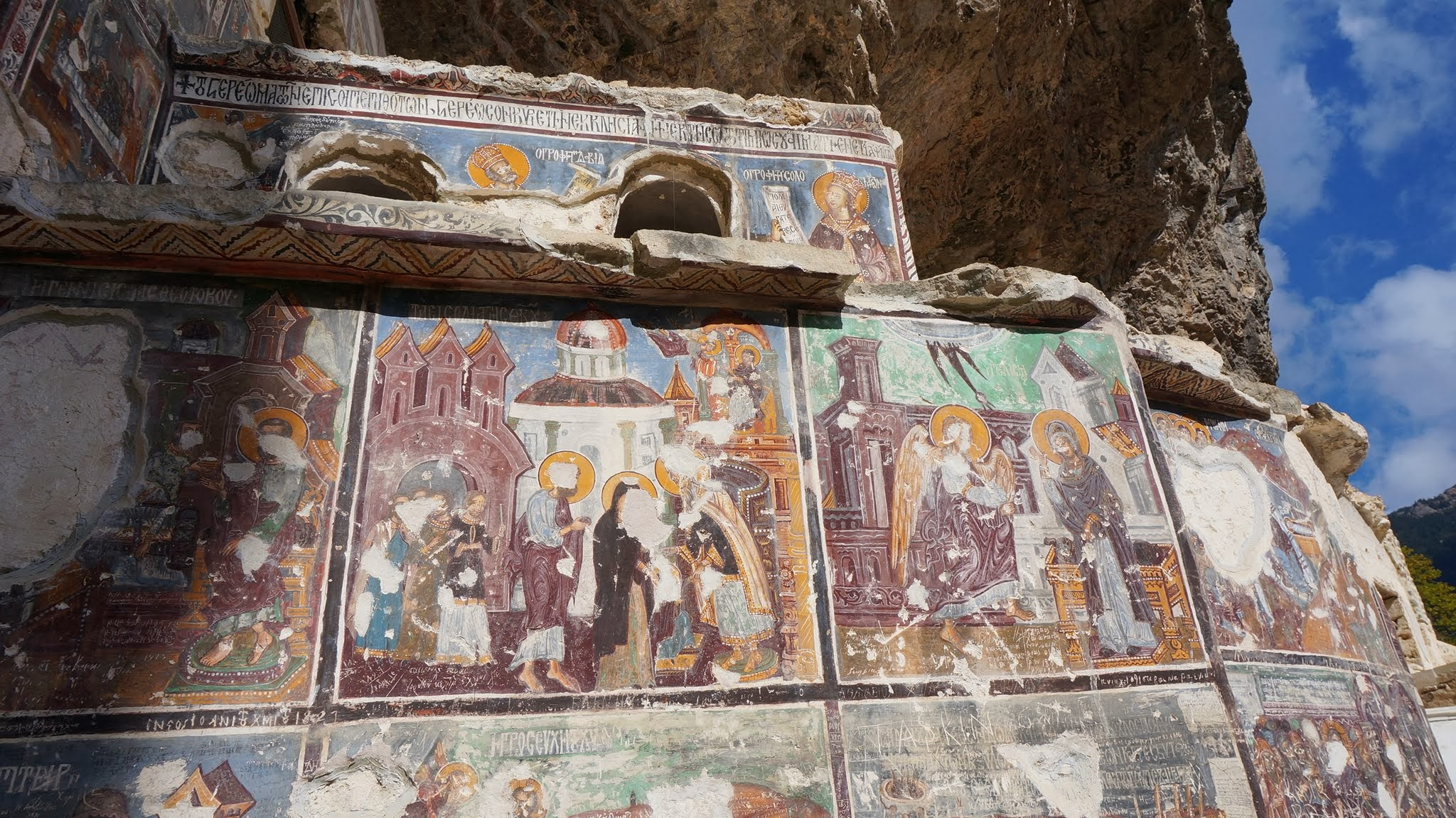

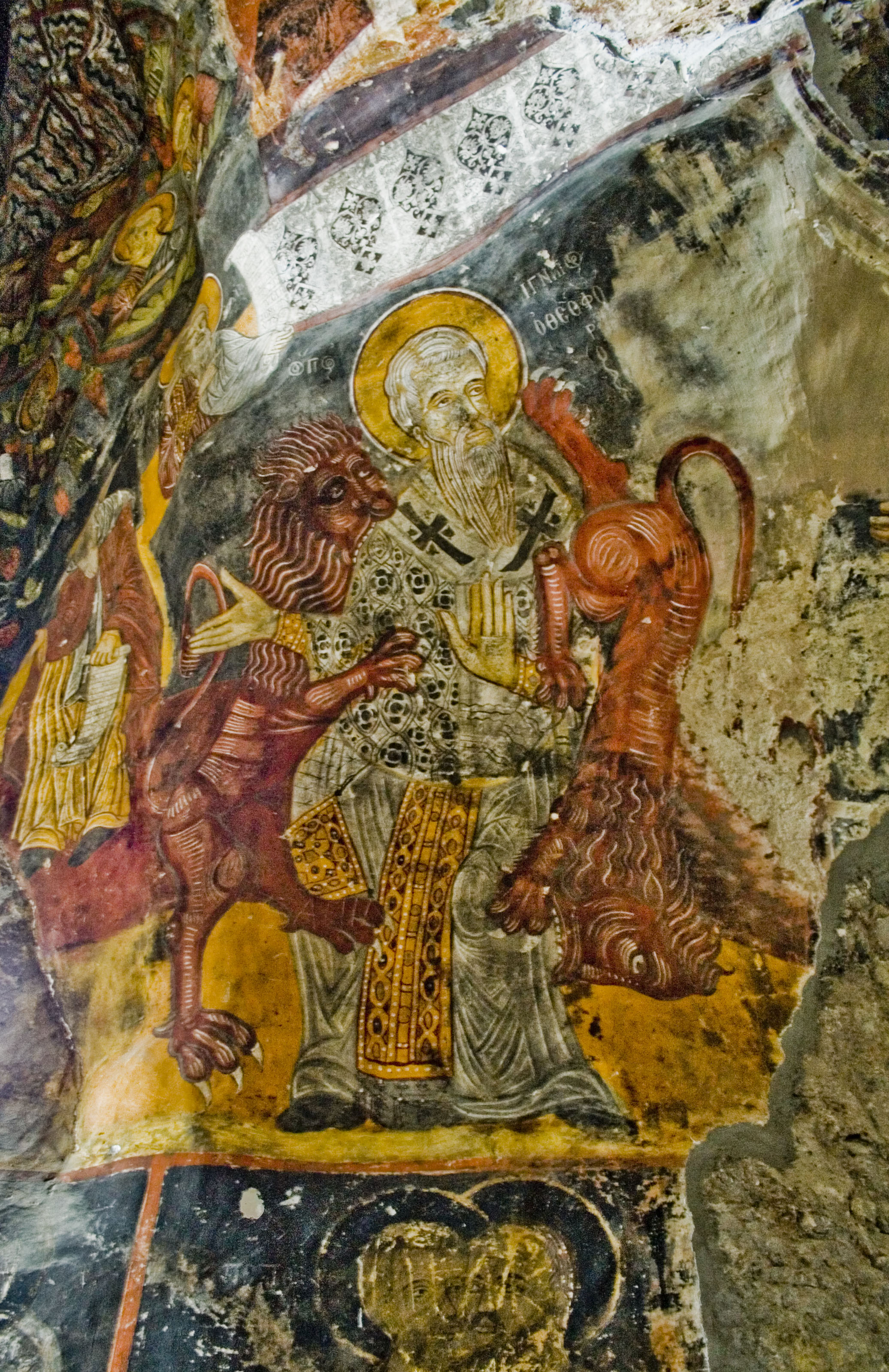

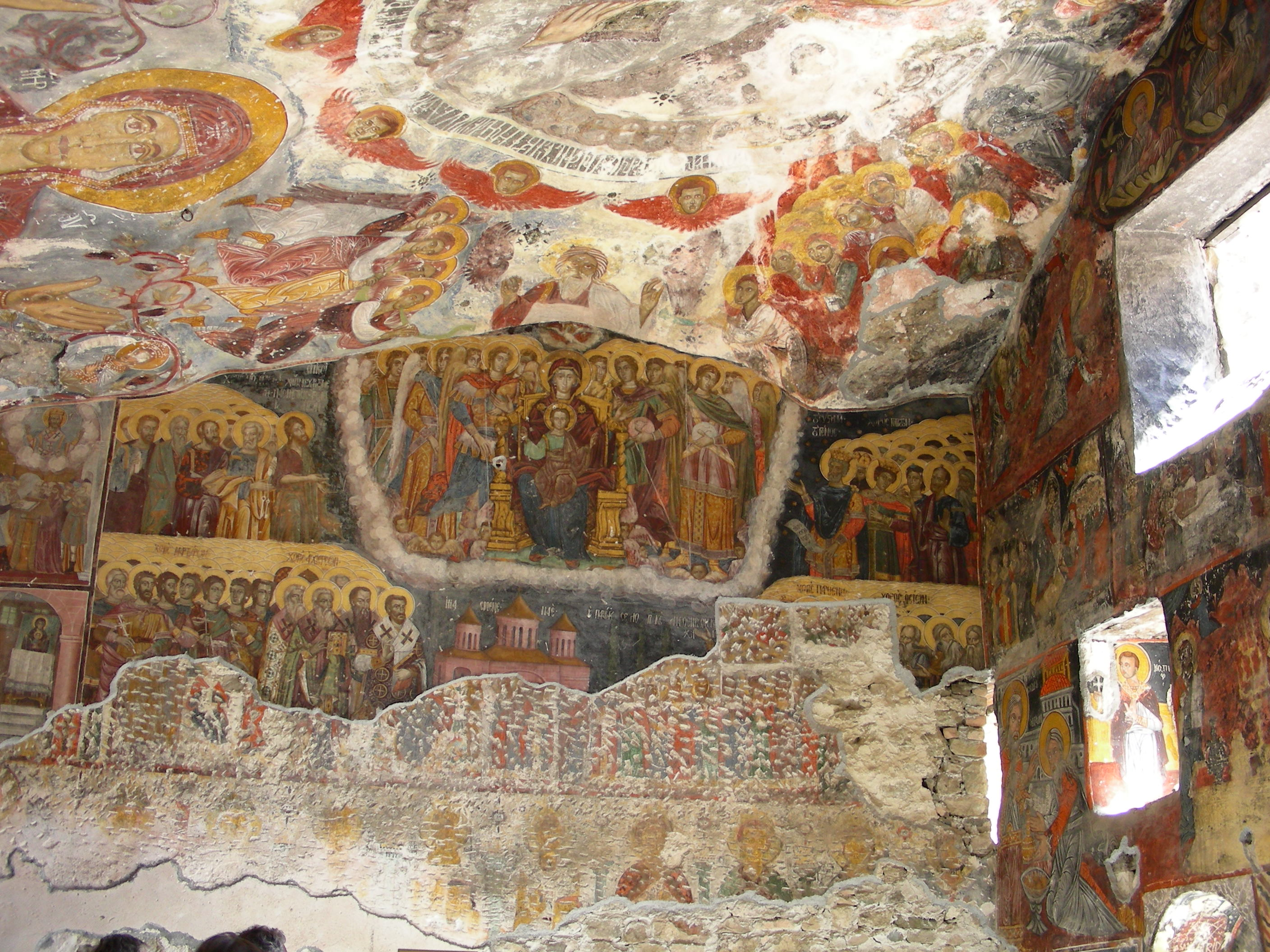

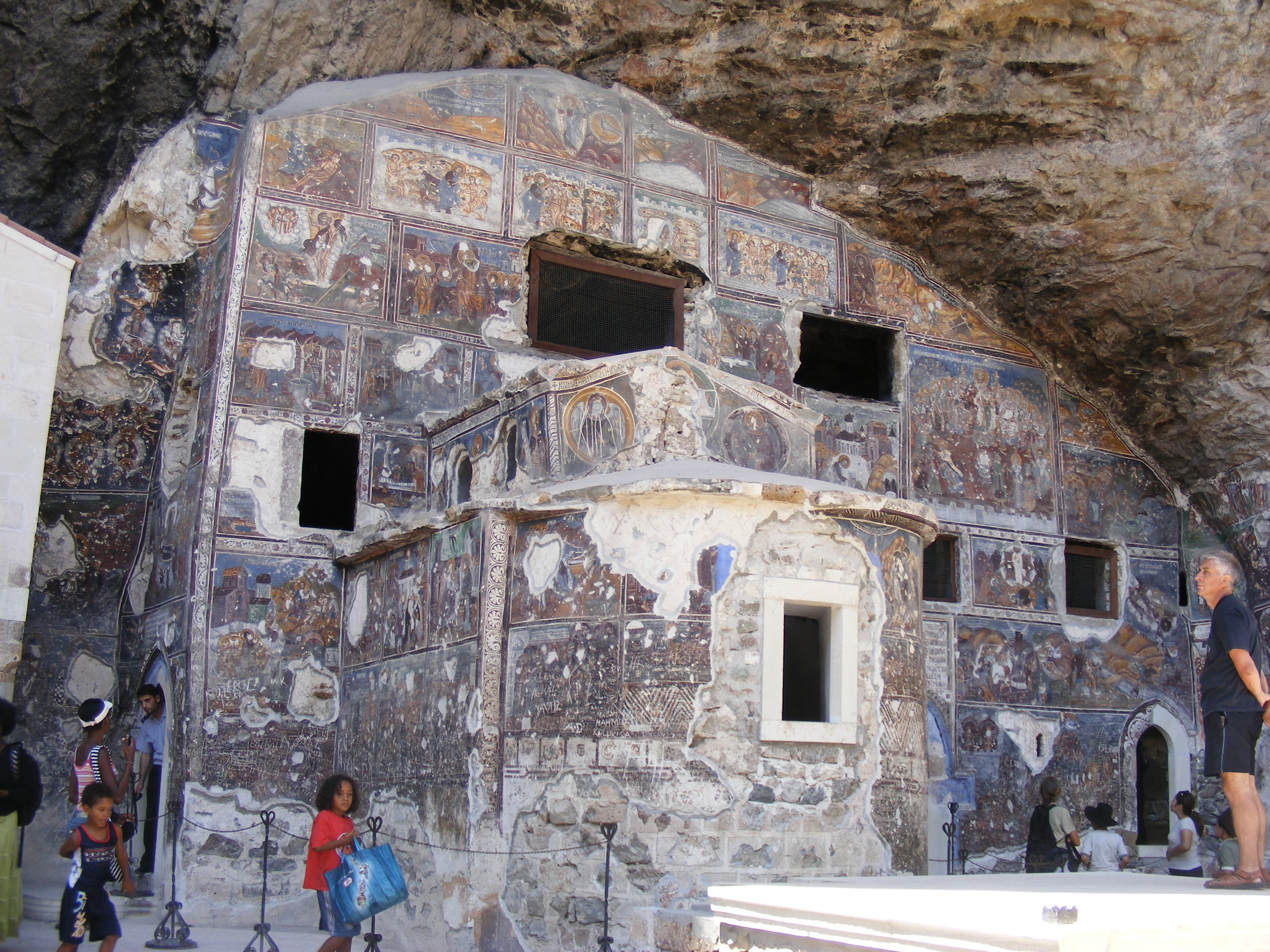
Rock Church

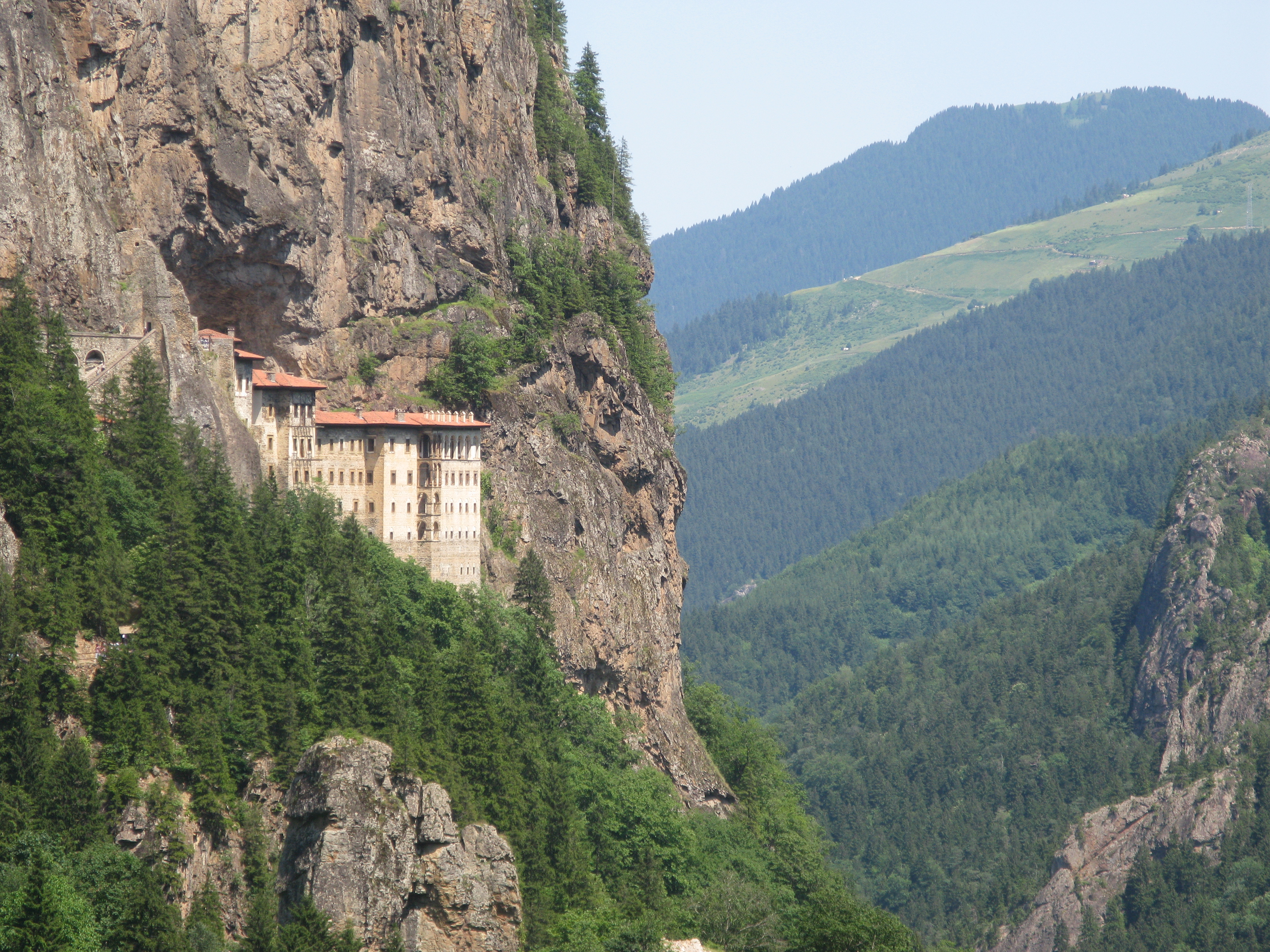

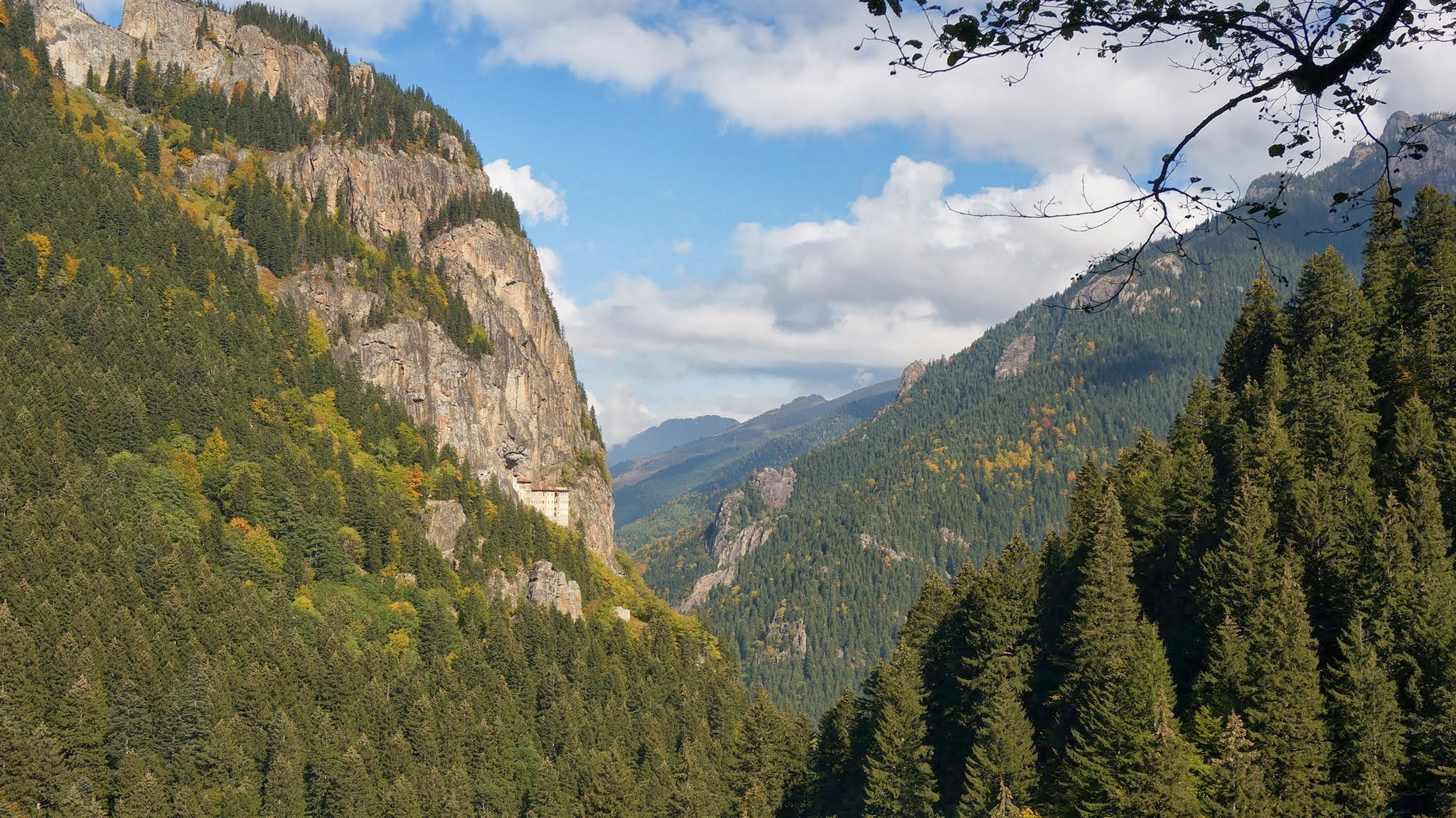

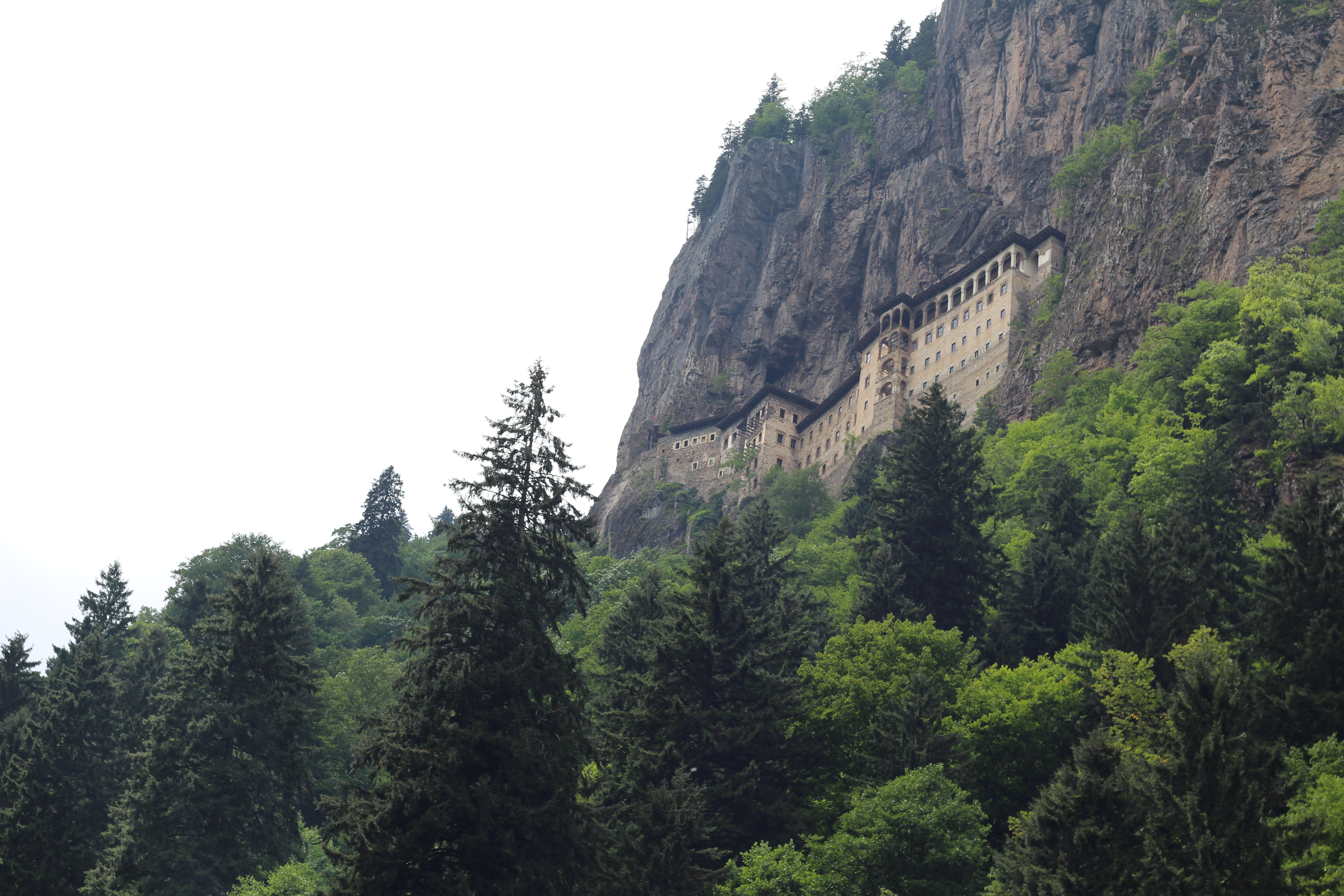

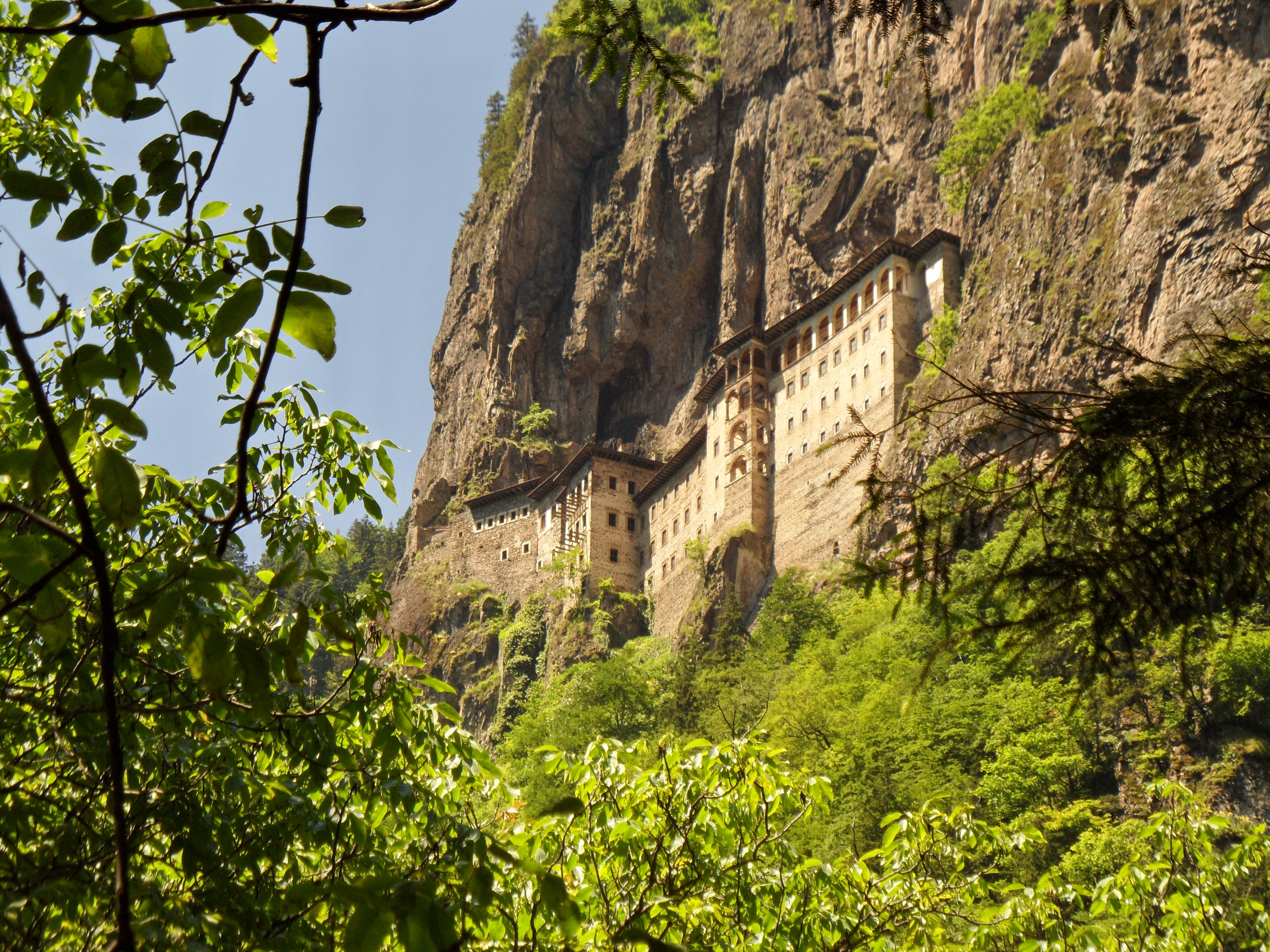

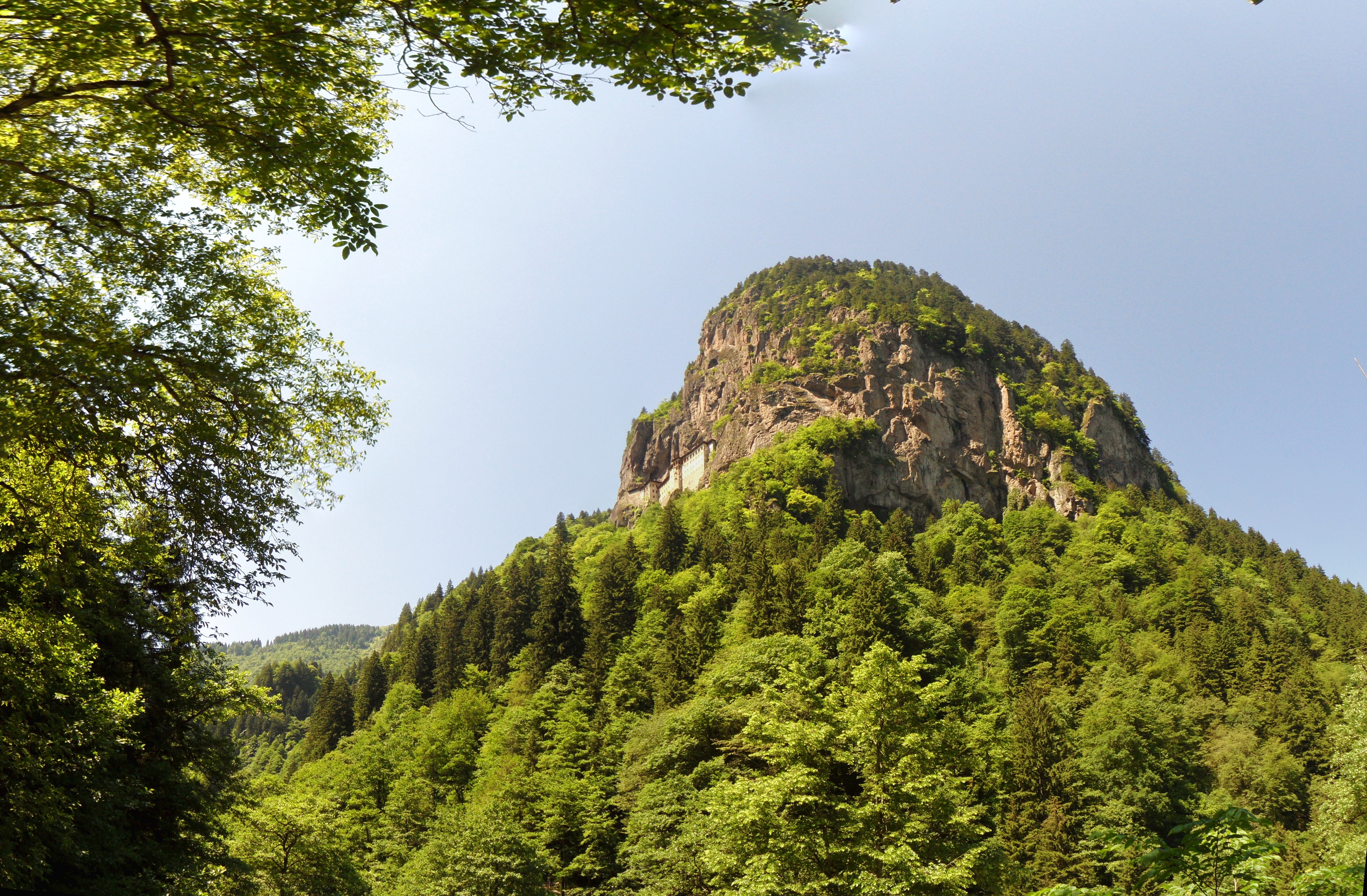

== See also ==
- Hagia Sophia, Trabzon
- Mokissos
