= Altındere Valley National Park =

National park in Trabzon, Turkey

- Altındere Vadisi Milli Parkı
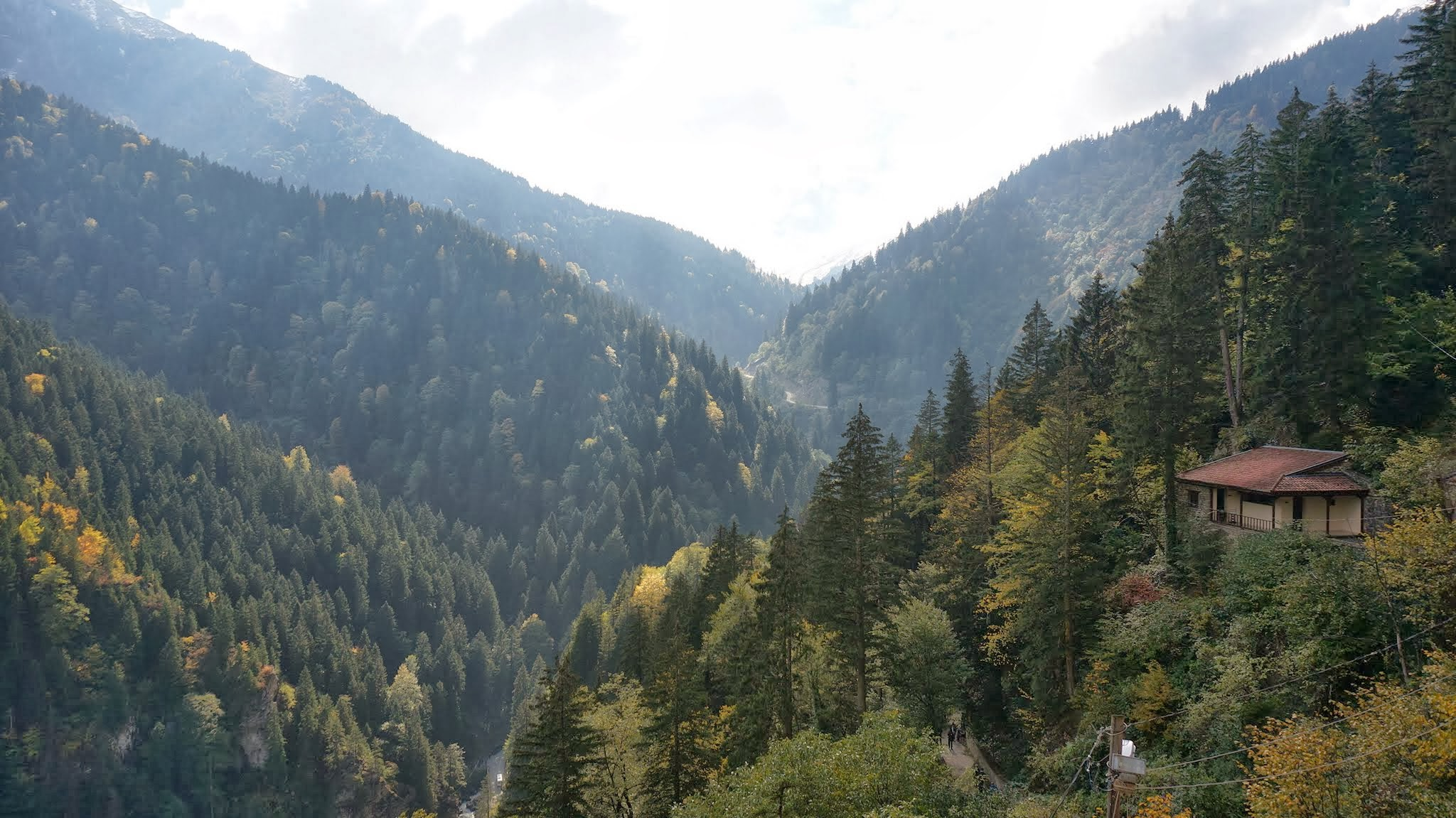
- A view of Altındere Valley.

- Location within Turkey
- Location: Maçka, Trabzon Province, Turkey
- Coordinates: 40°42′31.62″N 39°38′55.18″E
- Area: 4,468 ha (11,040 acres)
- Established: September 9, 1987
- Governing body: Ministry of Forest and Water Management
- Website: www.milliparklar.gov.tr/mp/altinderevadisi/index.htm

Altındere Valley National Park (Turkish: Altındere Vadisi Milli Parkı), established on September 9, 1987, is a national park in northeastern Turkey. The national park is located in Maçka district of Trabzon Province. It is best known for containing the Sumela Monastery

The park covers an area of 4,468 ha (11,040 acres).
