= Vasil Chekalarov =

Bulgarian revolutionary (1874–1913)

Voivode Vasil Chekalarov
- Васил Христов Чекаларов
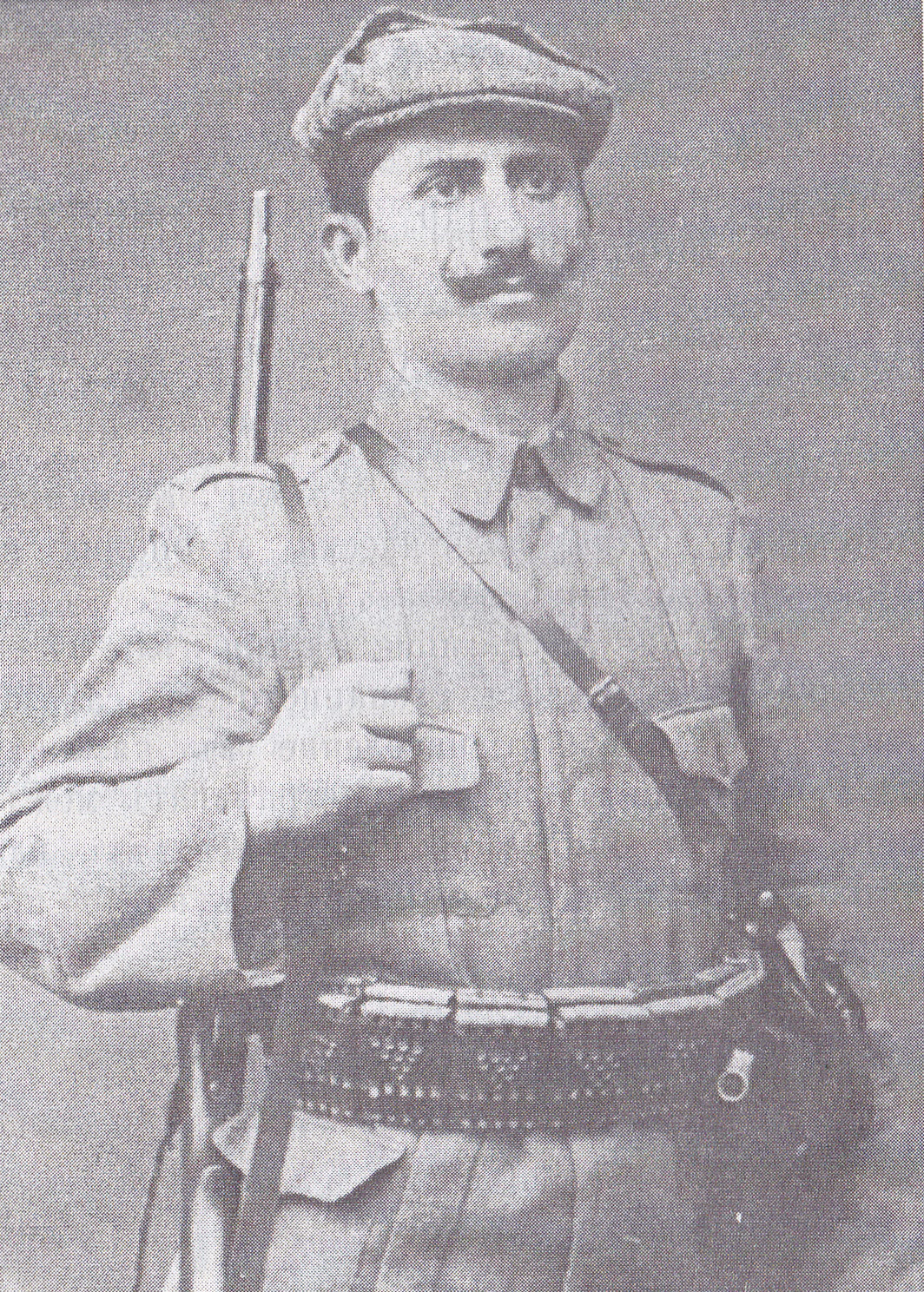
- Vasil Chekalarov c. 1908
- Born: Vasil Hristov Chekalarov; 1874; Smardesh, Monastir Vilayet, Ottoman Empire
- Died: 9 July 1913 (aged 38–39); Belkamen, Ottoman Empire
- Spouse: Olga Chekalarova
- Military career
- Allegiance: IMRO; Kingdom of Bulgaria
- Branch: Bulgarian Army
- Unit: Macedonian-Adrianopolitan Volunteer Corps
- Conflicts: Ilinden Uprising; Macedonian Struggle; Balkan Wars; First Balkan War; Second Balkan War †

Vasil Hristov Chekalarov (Bulgarian/Macedonian: Васил Христов Чекаларов; 1874 – 9 July 1913) was a Bulgarian revolutionary and a leader of the Kastoria district as part of the Internal Macedonian Revolutionary Organisation (IMRO) in Macedonia. H. N. Brailsford described Chekalarov as one of the chiefs of the Bulgarian insurgent movement and "cruel but competent general" of the southern insurgents in Macedonia.

He was a leading komitaji in the bands of IMRO and took part in the battles against the Ottoman authorities as well as before the Ilinden Uprising as after it. In the 1900s, he created a channel for illegal purchase and transfer of firearms from Greece to Southern Macedonia.

== Life ==
=== Early life ===
Vasil Chekalarov was born in 1874 in the village Smardesh (modern Krystallopigi, Greece). His father was a migrant labourer like many men in the village. Chekalarov studied Greek at a local Patriarchist school. He also apparently learned Albanian, perhaps while in the village markets west of Smardesh, closer to the town of Korçe. Apart from Greek and Albanian, Chekalarov also spoke Bulgarian and the local Slavic dialect. His father made him stop attending school after the fourth grade. Chekalarov worked as his father's apprentice, who was then a mason. Afterwards, his father sent him to study in the newly established Principality of Bulgaria. Chekalarov finished high school in Shumen in eastern Bulgaria, while working at local construction sites. Back in Macedonia, he was imprisoned on the charge of violating a Greek female teacher in 1893. He escaped and returned to Bulgaria where he worked in a quarry and learned to work as a cobbler. Chekalarov organised a fraternity among other workers from Kastoria in Bulgaria. While working in a factory in the area of Sofia, he befriended another migrant from Ottoman Macedonia, Bulgarian military officer Boris Sarafov. The two became close friends and Chekalarov expanded his network. Sarafov encouraged Chekalarov to join the Internal Macedonian Revolutionary Organisation (IMRO). Chekalarov, who did not have any military experience, was initiated into the Organisation.

=== Revolutionary activity ===
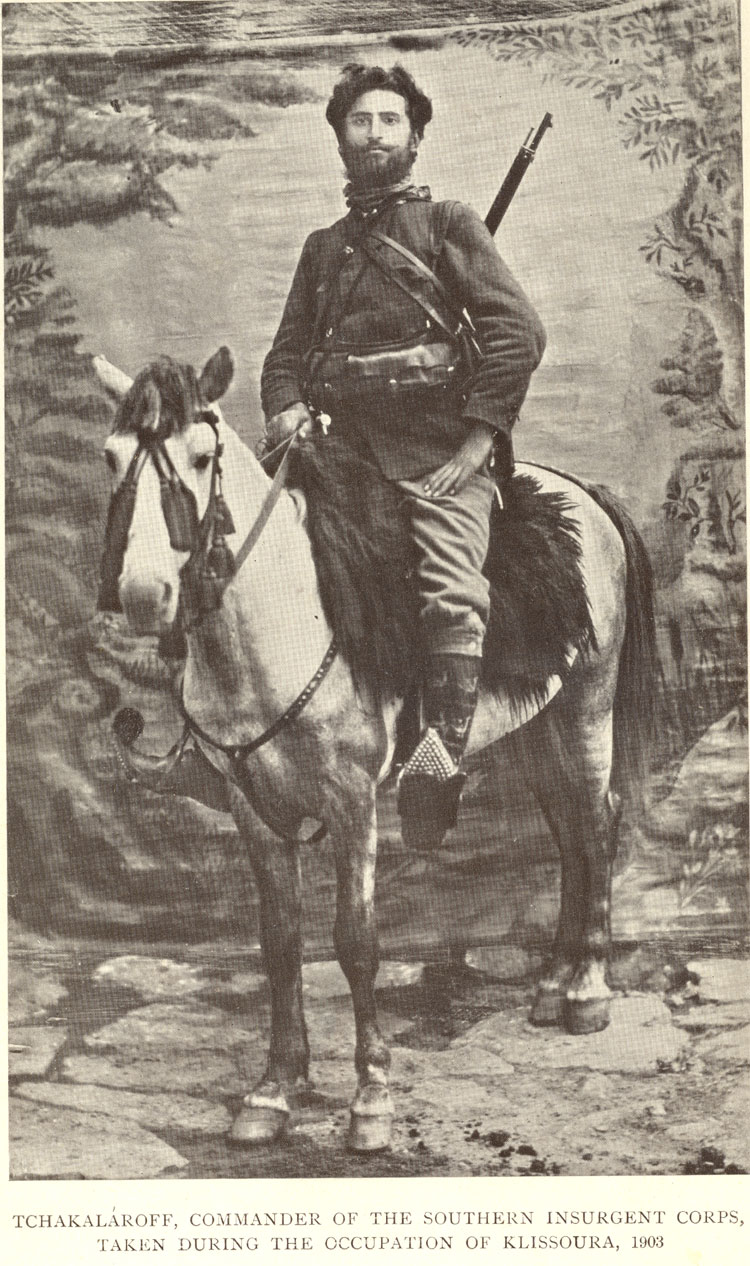
Vasil Chekalarov during the occupation of Kleisoura in the Ilinden Uprising of 1903.

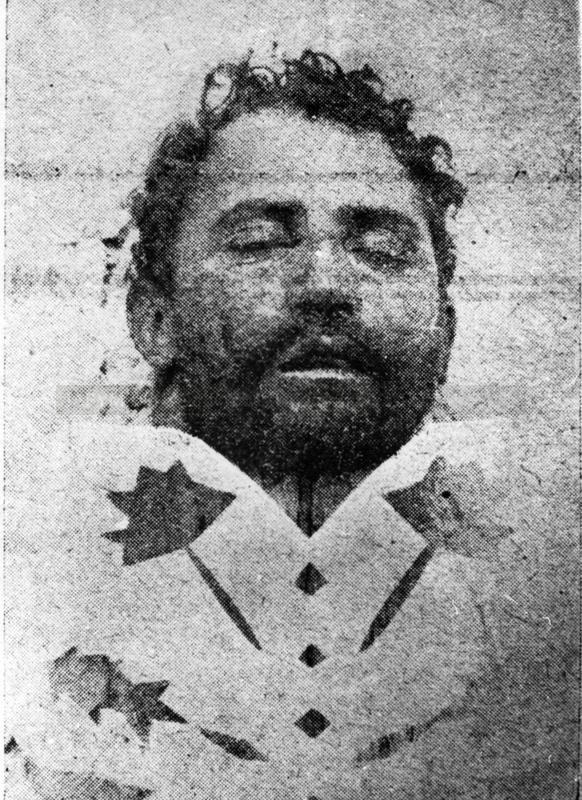
The severed head of Vasil Chekalarov c. 1913

He returned to his village in 1900 to begin his revolutionary activity. Chekalarov contributed to the growth and development of the IMRO in the fields of supply and organisation. Due to the war between Greece and the Ottoman Empire in 1897, the Greco-Ottoman border was heavily guarded on both sides. Chekalarov was the main procurer for IMRO in its southern districts. He was able to cross across the Ottoman-Greek border posing as an Albanian merchant. As he was fluent in both Greek and Albanian, he developed contacts in Athens connected to the international trade in weapons. Chekalarov transformed his native village into a hub of IMRO activity, trafficking rifles and using the village as a base to store explosive materials he imported from abroad. As a commander of the district of Kastoria, through his contact and field work with senior leaders (especially those who had received a military education in Bulgaria), he learned bomb-making and developed his own personal network of weapon smugglers and sponsors. Along with other band leaders from the neighbouring villages of Dambeni, Roulia and Gabresh, Chekalarov maintained a strict regime of discipline and extortion in the northern parts of Kastoria. Per historian Ryan Gingeras, he and other band leaders gained reputations as merciless killers with beheadings, house burnings, bombings, and shootings regularly conducted as tools to enforce local discipline, take revenge, or alter the political landscape of a region. His control over the region did not go unchallenged. Ottoman forces patrolled the region. The metropolitan Germanos Karavangelis, who was appointed to the Patriarchist bishopric of Kastoria in 1900, sent bands to counter the influence of Chekalarov's bands, to maintain the interests of Greece and the Patriarch. Ottoman authorities supported and protected Karavangelis, who was seen as useful for countervailance. In 1901, Chekalarov murdered an Ottoman informant in the village Konomladi, as well as a woman from the village, who betrayed Gotse Delchev's cheta by informing the Ottomans. In his diary on 29 December 1902, he wrote about a "Grecoman" priest who tried to convince Chekalarov and his comrades that they were Greeks, afterwards claiming that they were neither Greeks nor Bulgarians, but Macedonians, which Chekalarov perceived as being ignorant about history. In 1903, Ottoman patrols remained active around Smardesh. Ottoman soldiers brought reservists and local volunteers, who often stole things and ransacked homes during their searches for revolutionaries and weapons. In response, Chakalarov organised several mass demonstrations to gain more support for IMRO and undermine the credibility of the Ottoman counter-insurgency.

Throughout March, Chekalarov remained in and around Smardesh alongside Sarafov, who was then a regional commander, and who was making preparations for a secret congress of IMRO to be held in the village Smilevo. On 10 April, Chekalarov and Sarafov were surprised by Ottoman troops who suddenly appeared on the hills around Smrdesh. In panic, Chekalarov sent messengers to neighbouring villages to gain reinforcements. Several hundred peasant recruits from the villages Vampeli, Kosinec and Dambeni arrived, appearing behind the soldiers and started shooting at them. While the Ottomans remained pinned down by gunfire from revolutionaries in Smrdesh and from the peasant rebels behind them, Chekalarov and Sarafov fled to the mountains. Chekalarov returned to Smrdesh on 14 May. In Smilevo, the central committee of IMRO voted to begin preparations for a mass uprising later that summer. Chekalarov's main base was destroyed after the burning of his village due to a skirmish with Ottomans. On 31 May 1903, Chekalarov participated in a battle in Lokvata, fought on a mountain slope by villagers from Dambeni, chetas (armed groups) and prominent komitadjis who inflicted disproportionate casualties on a much larger Ottoman force. His brother Foti died in the battle.

Ahead of the Ilinden uprising, his men clashed repeatedly with Ottoman troops. Between June and July, Chekalarov executed around ten civilians from villages neighbouring Smardesh for collaboration with the authorities. Chekalarov also clashed with former IMRO member Kottas and at the end of June, he attacked the village Roulia with his komitadjis and gained the lower part of the village, but Kottas held out in the upper part of the village with his men. During the uprising in August 1903, he commanded the insurgents in the region of Kastoria. On the first day of the uprising, Chekalarov murdered 26 Muslims at the village Zervaini. Chekalarov managed to occupy Neveska on 19 August. He was able to partially avenge the destruction of Smardesh in late August, when he and several hundred insurgents attacked Bildishta, which was seen as a centre of Muslim and Albanian attacks on Smardesh. IMRO insurgents also burned down several Albanian villages west of Smardesh. At the end of October, Chekalarov, like many of the leaders, acknowledged the defeat of the uprising. Chekalarov, dressed as an Aromanian, along with around 20 people, crossed the Greek border at Velemisti. In Greece, he was arrested along with the rest and held for two weeks, but they were able to arrive in Sofia at the end of November.

After the uprising, he fought against the Greek Struggle for Macedonia. In March 1908, he attended the Kyustendil Congress of IMRO. As a commander of a Bulgarian guerrilla band, Chekalarov supported the Hellenic Army in the First Balkan War in 1912-1913. Later he fought on the side of the Bulgarian Army on the front in Eastern Thrace in the composition of the Macedonian-Adrianopolitan Volunteer Corps. He was killed by Greek troops during the Second Balkan War at Belkamen (modern Drosopigi, Florina, Greece) on 9 July 1913 and his head was publicly displayed in Florina.

== Legacy ==
In 1934, a Bulgarian village was renamed Chakalarovo in honour of Vasil Chekalarov. In the early 1950s the Yugoslav government submitted a memorandum to the UN, where the population in Bulgarian Macedonia was declared a "Yugoslav Macedonian minority", persecuted by the authorities in Sofia. A lot of old IMRO revolutionaries, including Chekalarov's wife Olga, declared themselves against these Yugoslav allegations.

His diary, describing the period from 1901 to 1903, whose originals were preserved by a relative of his, was published in 2001 in Sofia. Gane Todorovski wrote a poem about him. An equestrian statue depicting him was placed in Skopje in 2013 as part of the Skopje 2014 project. Before the placement of the statue, he was unknown to the general public in North Macedonia. The Macedonian historiography and the Bulgarian historiography regard him as a hero. A street started bearing his name in Varna in 2018.
