= Dendrochori =

Dendrochori (Greek meaning tree village) may refer to several places in Greece:

- Dendrochori, Kastoria, a village in the Kastoria regional unit
- Dendrochori, Larissa, a village in the Larissa regional unit
- Dendrochori, Trikala, a village in the Trikala regional unit
- Dendrochori, Aetolia-Acarnania, a village in Aetolia-Acarnania
