= Krystallopigi =

Place in Greece

Krystallopigi Κρυσταλλοπηγή
- Municipal unit
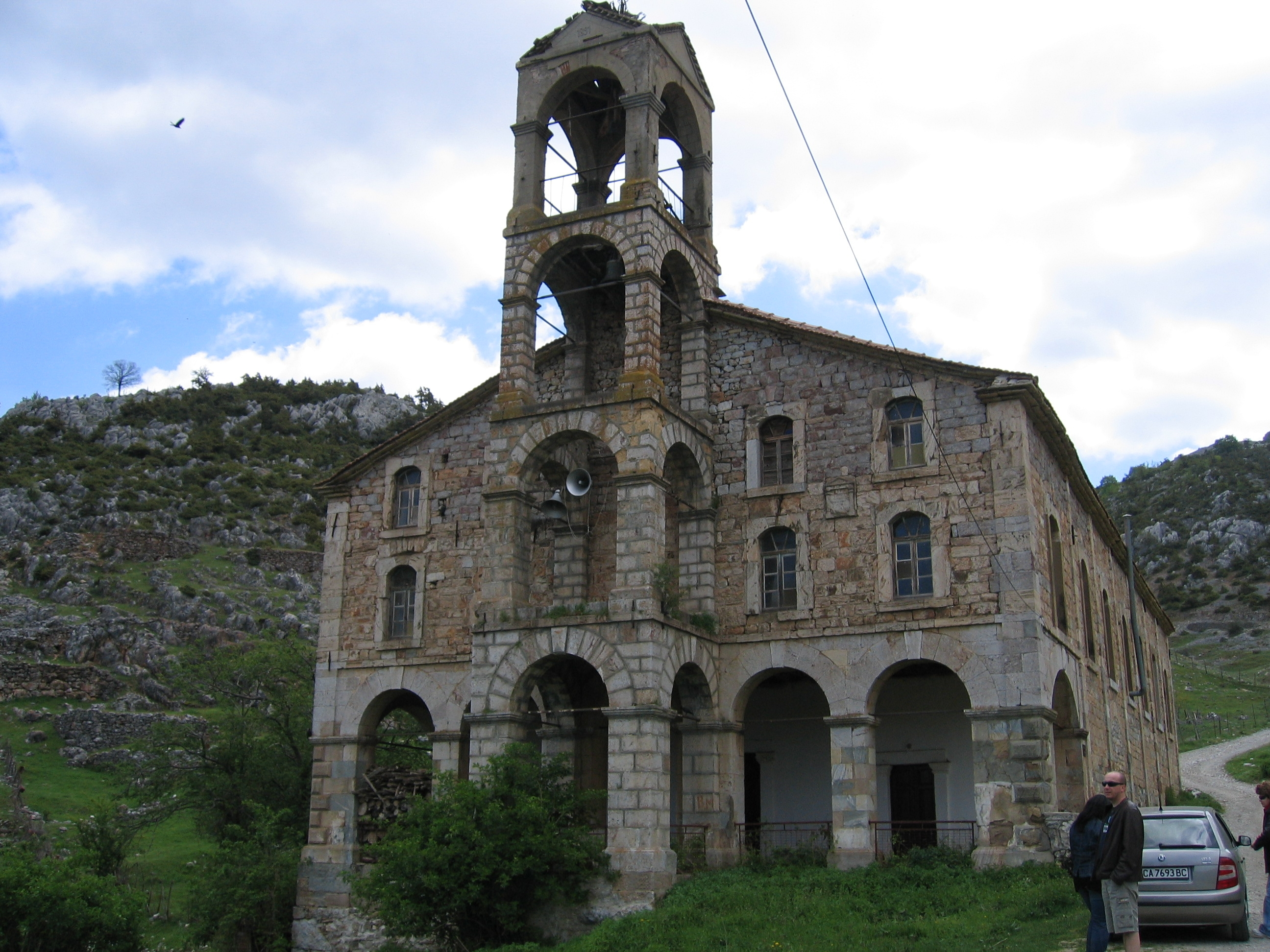

- Location within the regional unit

- Location within Greece
- Coordinates: 40°38′N 21°05′E
- Country: Greece
- Administrative region: West Macedonia
- Regional unit: Florina
- Municipality: Prespes

Area
  - Municipal unit: 102.0 km^{2} (39.4 sq mi)
- Elevation: 1,130 m (3,710 ft)

Population (2021)
  - Municipal unit: 145
  - Municipal unit density: 1.42/km^{2} (3.68/sq mi)
  - Community: 111
- Time zone: UTC+2 (EET)
  - Summer (DST): UTC+3 (EEST)
- Vehicle registration: ΡΑ

Krystallopigi (Greek: Κρυσταλλοπηγή) or Kroustallopigi (Κρουσταλλοπηγή), before 1926: Smardesi (Σμαρδέσι) is a former community in Florina regional unit, West Macedonia, Greece. Since the 2011 local government reform it is part of the municipality Prespes, of which it is a municipal unit. Krystallopigi is located close to the Greek–Albanian border and is 50 km (31 mi) from Florina.

The municipal unit has an area of 101.984 km^{2}. The population is 145 (2021). The main village is also called Krystallopigi. After the Greek Civil War, the village was resettled with Aromanians from Epirus. Today they still form the majority of the town's population. Nearby is located the depopulated village Vambel.

Krystallopigi borders Albania to the west; Prespes municipality to the north; Korestia municipality, Kastoria regional unit, to the east and southeast; and Kastraki community, Kastoria regional unit, to the south. A major road border crossing into Albania is located here. The Albanian side of the border crossing is known as Kapshtica, 9 km east from Bilisht.

== Name ==
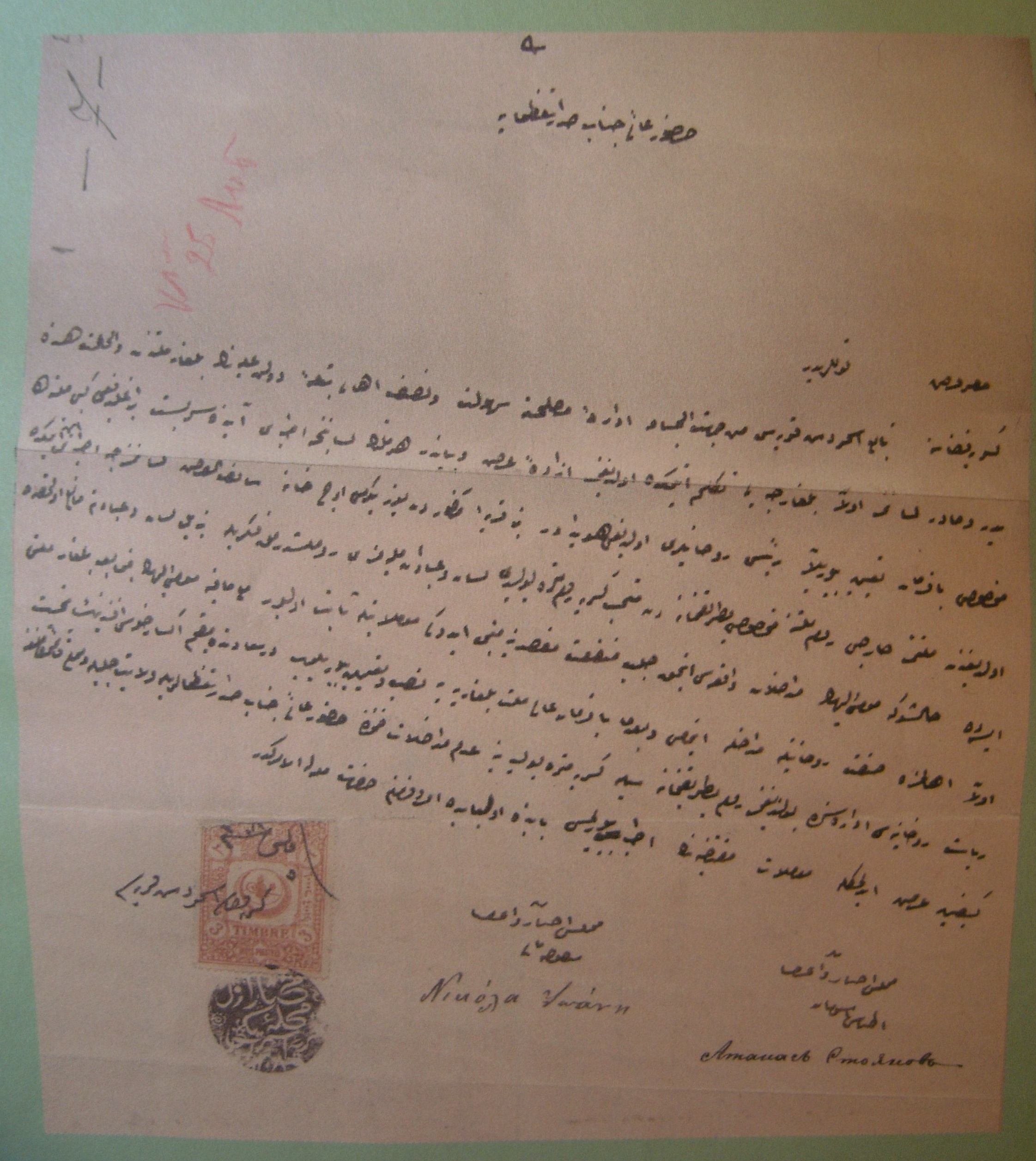
A request from local inhabitants to the Grand Vizier from 1892. There they insist to be transferred from the Greek Patriarchate to the Bulgarian Exarchate.

Until 1926, the village was known as Smardesi (Greek: Σμαρδέσι). In the Bulgarian it is known as Смърдеш, Smardesh or Smrdesh, while in Macedonian as Смрдеш, Smrdeš. The original name of the village is believed to be derived from the local Slavic name of a nearby mineral spring Smrdliva Voda meaning stinky water. The modern name Krystallopigi means "crystal spring".

== History ==
The village was mentioned in an Ottoman defter of 1530, under the name of Ismirdesh, and was described as having 53 households. Contemporary sources often classified the population of the village as Orthodox Christian and ethnically Bulgarian. There were 1,780 inhabitants in 1900. The church of St. George was built in 1891.

Many residents of Smardesh took part in the struggle of IMORO. There was an illegal foundry and depot for hand grenades in 1903. The village was burned by Turkish troops in May 1903. It was plundered and burned for the second time in 1903 during the Ilinden–Preobrazhenie Uprising. Before its destruction, the inhabitants spoke the Dolna Koreshcha variant of the Kostur dialect.

Immigrants from Smardesi in Toronto, Canada, participated in the early Bulgarian community to build church infrastructure. In mid–1941 Krystallopigi along with Slavic Macedonian inhabitants from several villages partook in a celebration commemorating the Battle of Lokvata, fought by Bulgarian revolutionaries (Komitadjis) against Ottoman soldiers in 1903.

During the Greek Civil War (1946-1949) Krystallopigi was destroyed and later rebuilt between 1957–1958. The rebuilt settlement is located east of the original location of the village. The Greek government assisted a group of nomadic transhumant Aromanians, known as the Arvanitovlachs to settle in Krystallopigi. Aromanians are the only inhabitants of the village.

Krystallopigi had 265 inhabitants in 1981. In fieldwork done by anthropologist Riki Van Boeschoten in late 1993, Krystallopigi was populated by Aromanians.

== Demographics ==
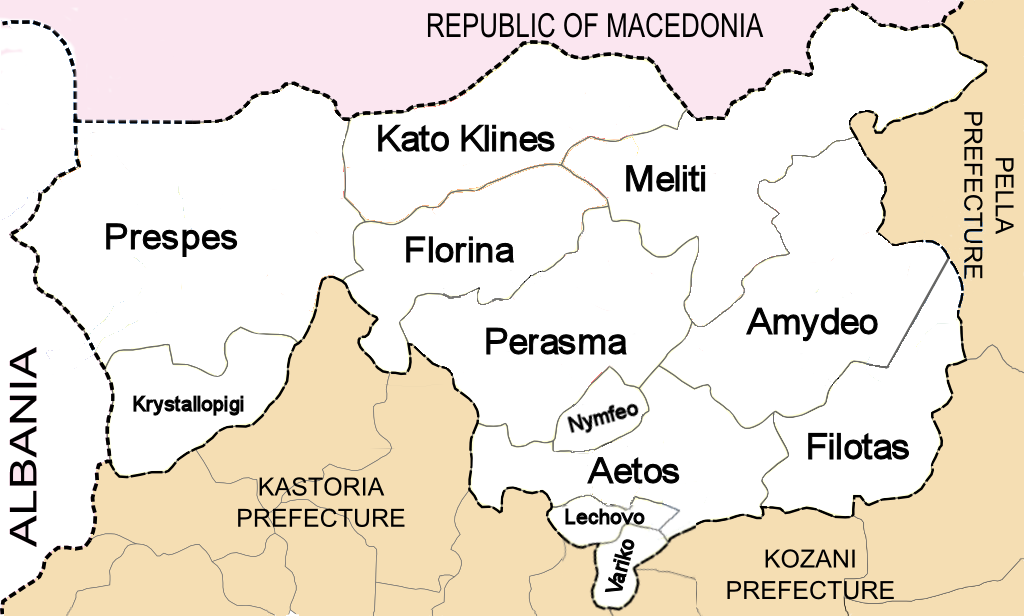
Map of Florina regional unit showing Krystallopigi municipal unit.

Historical population
Year	Pop.	±%
1913	1,488	—
1920	718	−51.7%
1928	598	−16.7%
1940	624	+4.3%
1961	364	−41.7%
1971	309	−15.1%
1981	265	−14.2%
2001	383	+44.5%
2011	359	−6.3%
2021	145	−59.6%

== Notable persons ==
- Vasil Chekalarov (1874–1913), Bulgarian revolutionary
- Atanas Koroveshov (1918–1945), partisan
