= Andrew Rossos =

Canadian-Macedonian historian

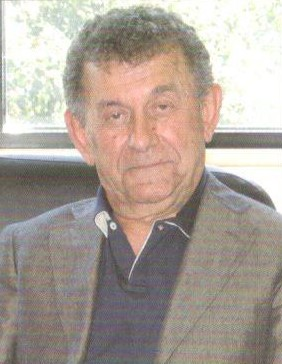
- Born: 28 February 1941 (age 85); Moschochori, Florina, Greece
- Occupation: Historian

Andrew Rossos (Macedonian: Ендру Росос, Greek: Ανδρέας Ρόσος; born 1941) is a Canadian-Macedonian Professor Emeritus of History at the University of Toronto.

== Early life and education ==
Rossos was born in 1941 in the village of Moschochori, Florina, Greece, from the Slavophone minority. During the Greek Civil War in 1948, he was evacuated to Czechoslovakia as a refugee child. Rossos attended primary school in Sobotin and Technical School in Prague. In 1958 he moved with the rest of his family to Canada and graduated from high school in Toronto. Rossos earned a bachelor's degree in history at Michigan State University in 1963 and did his postgraduate studies at the Stanford University, earning his PhD in 1971. Since then, he has worked at the University of Toronto and became a professor of history there in 1982.

== Career ==
At the end of 2008, his book Macedonia and the Macedonians: A History was published. He authored a monograph on Russian foreign policy in the Balkans titled Russia and the Balkans: Inter-Balkan Rivalries and Russian Foreign Policy, 1908–1914.

In his book, Macedonia and the Macedonians: A History, Rossos' account starts from 600 BC and ends in 2001 AD. He identifies two "golden ages" of the Macedonians, namely the periods during the Alexander the Great's empire, which he sees as non-Greek and "the first Macedonian state", and Tsar Samuil's Empire which he sees as another "Macedonian empire". He also identifies three "dark ages" of the Macedonians, namely thirteen centuries of Greek-Roman-Byzantine-Bulgarian rule, half a millennium under Ottoman rule and a "Greek-Serbian-Bulgarian occupation" from 1913 to 1944. Rossos describes World War II to today again as luminous. In the book, he also describes "innovative thrusts of Macedonian culture", such as the effect of Cyril and Methodius, who Rossos sees as ethnic Macedonians. The book is valuable for political and diplomatic history, despite being limited for claiming the existence of a sole ethnic Macedonian identity across the whole Macedonian region since antiquity and challenging the Greek origins of the pre-Slavic population, which is consistent with Macedonian scholarship.

In 2012, Andrew Rossos was elected to the Macedonian Academy of Sciences and Arts as a foreign member.

== Reception ==
Rossos is an adherent of some controversial views espoused by the historiography in North Macedonia. For example, he has adopted the fringe theory of the continuity between the ancient and the modern Macedonians. He also espoused that Macedonian national identity was already well developed before WWII, a dubious view, especially for the Bulgarian part of the Macedonian population. He has been described by anthropologist Loring Danforth as one of the more "moderate" Macedonian scholars who nevertheless implies a "vague form of historical or cultural continuity between the ancient and the modern Macedonians in what is ultimately a form of nationalist historiography". Per historian Stefan Troebst, Rossos has clearly and consciously taken sides with the historians and politicians of the Republic of Macedonia (now North Macedonia), and states that his works suffer from what he calls "Makedonianismus" (Macedonism). According to Danforth, "Rossos’s implicit suggestion of a continuity linking ‘the first Macedonian state’ of antiquity with the modern Macedonian state of the twentieth century could be interpreted as a subtle attempt to counter the more convincing Greek claims for cultural continuity with Alexander the Great and the ancient Macedonians". Professor of international relations Aristotle Tziampiris criticizes Rossos' claim of a "huge" Macedonian minority in Greece, possibly numbering to more than 100,000s, pointing out that the Rainbow Party, a party aiming primarily to exert pressure in order to secure minority rights and amend what it perceives as human rights violations against Slavic-speakers who self-identify as ethnic Macedonians, never gained more than 10,000 votes, or 0.1% of the entire Greek population.

== Bibliography ==
- "The Disintegration of Yugoslavia, Macedonia's Independence, and Stability in the Balkans." In War and Change in the Balkans: Nationalism, Conflict, and Cooperation, edited by Brad K. Blitz. Cambridge: Cambridge University Press, 2006.
- Rossos, Andrew (2000). "Great Britain and Macedonian Statehood and Unification, 1940–49". East European Politics and Societies. 14 (1): 119–142. doi:10.1177/0888325400014001006. S2CID 144297050.
- Rossos, Andrew (1997). "Incompatible Allies: Greek Communism and Macedonian Nationalism in the Civil War in Greece, 1943–1949". Journal of Modern History. 69 (1): 42–76. doi:10.1086/245440. S2CID 143512864.
- "The British Foreign Office and Macedonian National Identity, 1918-1941." In National Character and National Ideology in Interwar Eastern Europe, edited by Ivo Banac and Katherine Verdey. New Haven: Yale Center for International and Area Studies, 1995.
- "The Macedonians of Aegean Macedonia: A British Officer's Report, 1944". Slavonic and East European Review. 69 (2): 282–309. 1991.
- The British Foreign Office and Macedonian National Identity, 1918–1941 (Slavic Review, 1994)
- Incompatible Allies: Greek Communism and Macedonian Nationalism in the Civil War in Greece, 1943–1949
- Macedonia and the Macedonians: A History (2008)
