= Agios Dimitrios, Kastoria =

Agios Dimitrios
- Settlement
- Location within Greece
- Coordinates: 40°35′10″N 21°3′47″E
- Country: Greece
- Geographic region: Macedonia
- Administrative region: Western Macedonia
- Regional unit: Kastoria
- Municipality: Kastoria
- Municipal unit: Kastraki
- Community: Ieropigi
- Time zone: UTC+2 (EET)
  - Summer (DST): UTC+3 (EEST)

Agios Dimitrios (Greek: Άγιος Δημήτριος, before 1928: Λαμπάνιστα – Lampanista) is an abandoned village in Kastoria Regional Unit, Macedonia, Greece. It is part of the community of Ieropigi.

The 1920 Greek census recorded 253 people in the village. Following the Greek–Turkish population exchange, Greek refugee families in Lampanista were from Pontus (4) in 1926. The 1928 Greek census recorded 228 village inhabitants. In 1928, the refugee families numbered 5 (18 people).

In mid–1941 Agios Dimitrios along with Slavic Macedonian inhabitants from several villages partook in a celebration commemorating the Battle of Lokvata, fought by Bulgarian revolutionaries (Komitadjis) against Ottoman soldiers in 1903.

In 1945, Greek Foreign Minister Ioannis Politis ordered the compilation of demographic data regarding the Prefecture of Kastoria. The village Agios Dimitrios had a total of 223 inhabitants, and was populated by 210 Slavophones with a Bulgarian national consciousness. The inhabitants spoke the Dolna Koreshcha variant of the Kostur dialect.
