= Uprising of Petar and Boyan =

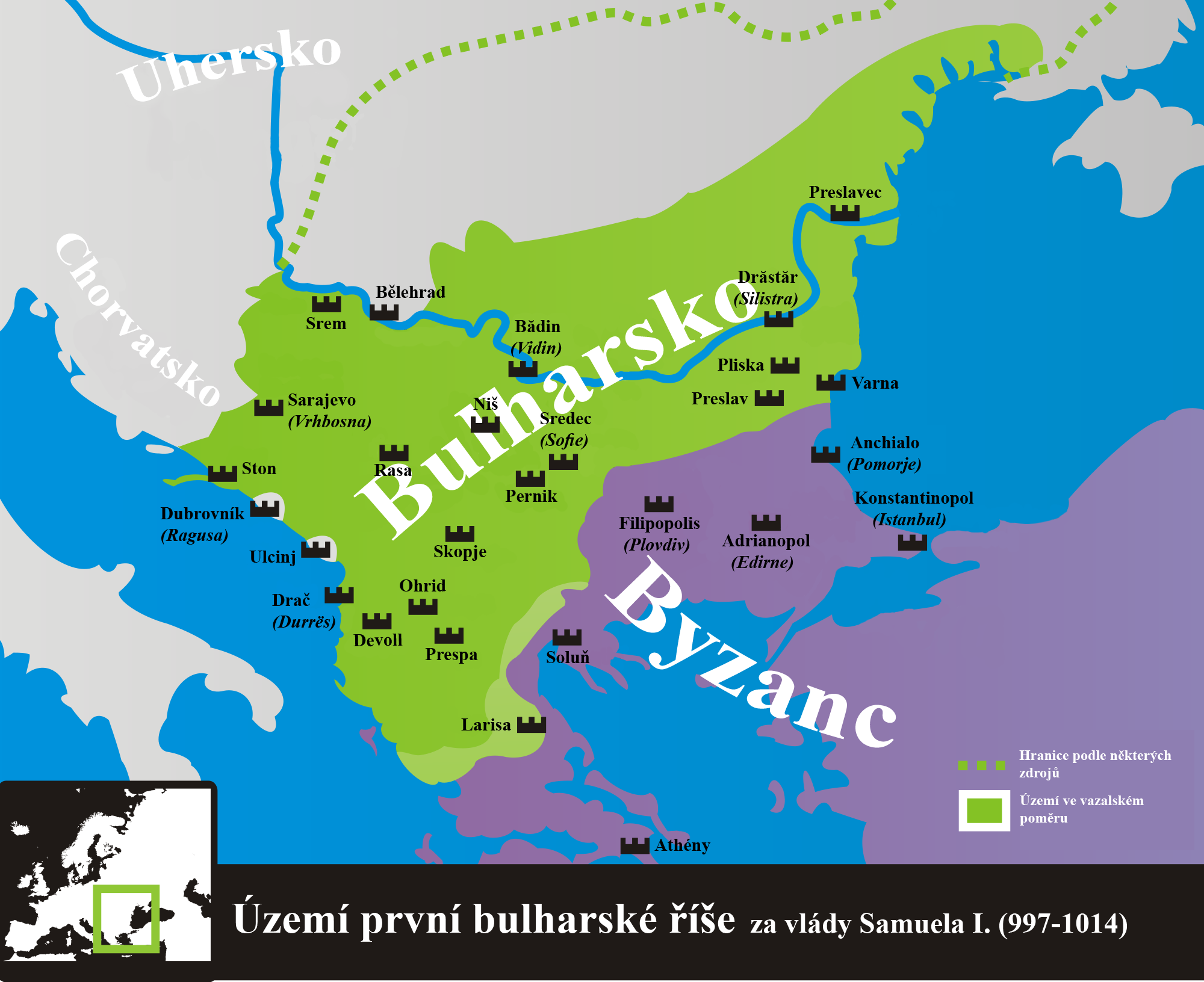
Bulgaria under Emperor Samuil.

Peter and Boyan were late-10th century Bulgarian nobles (boyars) from Byzantine-administered northeastern Bulgaria. They are mentioned in Annales seu cronicae incliti Regni Poloniae by Jan Długosz in the context of their successful struggle against Byzantium:

Two Bulgarian warlords – Peter and Boyan – began a war against the Greeks, and after securing a few victories, worried Constantine's country so much, that its power was shaken and diminished for a long time.

== Background ==
After the heavy blow dealt to the Bulgarian Empire by the Rus' Prince Svyatoslav I, in 971 the Byzantines, under the pretext of liberating Bulgaria from the Rus', captured the capital Preslav and expelled Svyatoslav's forces from the Balkans. However, following these events, Bulgarian Emperor (Tzar) Boris II was taken hostage to Constantinople by Byzantine Emperor John I Tzimiskes and forced to publicly abdicate his throne. The eastern portion of the Bulgarian Empire was annexed by Byzantium, while the western parts were left to their own devices and came under the control of the four sons of the Bulgarian governor of Sredets (modern Sofia) - count Nikola. The fours sons (David, Moisei, Aron, and Samuil) came to be collectively known by the Byzantines as the Cometopuli ("sons of the count"), and would lead Bulgarian resistance to Byzantine subjugation (formally in the name of the captive Boris II).

== The Uprising ==
After the death of John Tzimiskes in 976, the Cometopuli launched a joint offensive into Byzantine territory. The former Bulgarian heartland to the northeast rose up in revolt and overthrew the Byzantine administration. The uprising was led by the local nobles Peter and Boyan, who became allies of the Cometopuli and submitted to their rule. The newly liberated territories remained in Bulgarian hands until 1001.

It is speculated that Peter and Boyan may have taken part in Bulgarian incursions north of the Danube river, which are evidenced by some interpretations of the Toparcha Gothicus of 1003 - a Byzantine source by the then-governor of the Theme of Cherson.
