= Moschochori, Florina =

Moschochori Μοσχοχώρι
- Settlement
- Location within Greece
- Coordinates: 40°38.6′N 21°03.9′E
- Country: Greece
- Administrative region: West Macedonia
- Regional unit: Florina
- Municipality: Prespes

Population (1940)
  - Community: 488
- Time zone: UTC+2 (EET)
  - Summer (DST): UTC+3 (EEST)
- Vehicle registration: ΡΑ

Moschochori (Greek: Μοσχοχώρι, before 1927: Βαμπέλι - Vampeli; Bulgarian: Въмбел Vambel; Macedonian: В'мбел V'mbeli) is a depopulated village in the community of Krystallopigi, Greece. Its population was 488 at the 1940 census and it spoke the Dolna Korèshcha variant of the Kostur dialect. Moschochori is located close to the Greek–Albanian border and is 50 km (31 mi) from Florina.

The church of St. Demetrius was built in 1871.

== History ==
The village is mentioned for the first time in an Ottoman defter from 1530 under the name Vimbil. The term means "spring" in different Bulgarian dialects. It has a church dating from 1871. During Ottoman rule in the late 19th century, competition arose between Greeks and Bulgarians over the village. Initially the conflict was waged through educational and religious propaganda, with a fierce rivalry developing between supporters of the Ecumenical Patriarchate of Constantinople, who identified as Greek, and supporters of the Bulgarian Exarchate, which had been established by the Bulgarians in 1860. Under these conditions, in the early 20th century a vicious guerrilla war broke between Bulgarian and Greek bands within the area.

In the book Ethnography of the vilayets of Adrianople, Monastir and Salonika, published in Constantinople in 1878, that reflected the statistics of the male population of 1873, Vambel is listed as a village with 150 households with 420 inhabitants Bulgarians. According to Al. Synvet ("Les Grecs de l'Empire Ottoman. Étude Statistique et Ethnographique") in 1878 in Moschohori (Vambeli) lived 600 Greeks. In 1889 Stefan Verkovich (Топографическо-этнографическій очеркъ Македоніи“) wrote that the village had 135 Bulgarian families with 656 inhabitants. According to statistics of Vasil Kanchov ("Macedonia. Ethnography and statistics") in 1900 Vambel had 650 inhabitants, all Bulgarians. According to the secretary of the Bulgarian Exarchate Dimitar Mishev ("La Macédoine et sa Population Chrétienne") in 1905 in Moschohori (Vambel) lived 960 Bulgarians Exarchists. During the Ilinden uprising Vambel was burned from the Ottomans. After the uprising, the Balkan Wars and the First World War part of the population gradually took refuge in Bulgaria. In 1936 the population was 680 people.

During the Second World War here was founded a subdivision of the pro-Bulgarian Ohrana. In 1945, Greek Foreign Minister Ioannis Politis ordered the compilation of demographic data regarding the Prefecture of Kastoria. The village Moschochori had a total of 448 inhabitants, and was populated by 430 Slavophones with a Bulgarian national consciousness. It was heavily destroyed during the Greek Civil War (1946–1949) and afterwards the rest of its population were forced to relocate to different Communist countries: Soviet Union, Bulgaria, Poland, Czechoslovakia, Yugoslavia and the village was practically depopulated.

== Notable people ==
- Andrew Rossos (1941–) Macedonian Canadian historian
