= Kastraki, Kastoria =

Kastraki Καστρακί
- Municipal unit
- Location within the regional unit

- Location within Greece
- Coordinates: 40°35′N 21°06′E
- Country: Greece
- Administrative region: West Macedonia
- Regional unit: Kastoria
- Municipality: Kastoria

Area
  - Municipal unit: 78.4 km^{2} (30.3 sq mi)

Population (2021)
  - Municipal unit: 457
  - Municipal unit density: 5.83/km^{2} (15.1/sq mi)
- Time zone: UTC+2 (EET)
  - Summer (DST): UTC+3 (EEST)
- Vehicle registration: KT

Kastraki (Greek: Καστρακί) is a former community in Kastoria regional unit, West Macedonia, Greece. Since the 2011 local government reform it is part of the municipality Kastoria, of which it is a municipal unit. The municipal unit has an area of 78.415 km^{2}. Population 457 (2021). The seat of the community was in Ieropigi. The other village in the community is Dendrochori. The village Agios Dimitrios (Labanitsa) is abandoned today.

== See also ==
- Kastraki, Phocis
