= Dendrochori, Kastoria =

Dendrochori
- Community
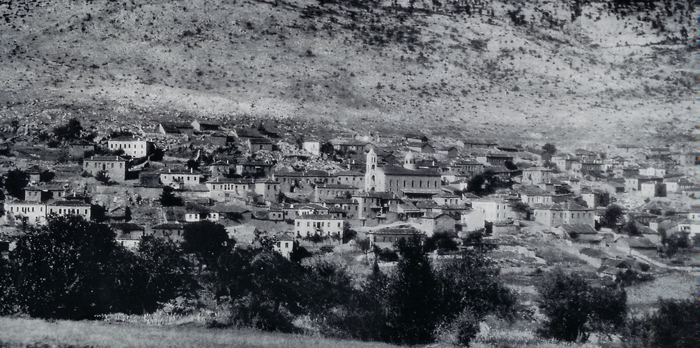

- Location within Greece
- Coordinates: 40°34′44″N 21°4′52″E
- Country: Greece
- Geographic region: Macedonia
- Administrative region: Western Macedonia
- Regional unit: Kastoria
- Municipality: Kastoria
- Municipal unit: Kastraki

Population (2021)
  - Community: 204
- Time zone: UTC+2 (EET)
  - Summer (DST): UTC+3 (EEST)

Dendrochori (Greek: Δενδροχώρι, before 1926: Δέμπενη – Dempeni; Bulgarian: Дъмбени, Dămbeni; Macedonian: Д’мбени, D'mbeni) is a village in Kastoria Regional Unit, Macedonia, Greece. Dendrochori is located approximately 10 km northwest of Kastoria and 6 km east of the center of the community Kastraki — the village Ieropigi. Dendrochori has 266 inhabitants (2011).

== History ==
According to narrative history, the village was founded by immigrants from villages Berik, Ano Sliveni (Gorno Sliveni), Saynovo, Vevi (Banitsa) and Agia Paraskevi (Sveta Petka).

In the book “Ethnographie des Vilayets d'Adrianople, de Monastir et de Salonique”, published in Constantinople in 1878, that reflects the statistics of the male population in 1873, Dëmbini was noted as a village with 280 households and 800 Bulgarians as inhabitants. In the same year all of the inhabitants were Greek Orthodox and none of them had turned to the Bulgarian Exarchate. In 1886 the Greek school of Dymbeni was still operating. In the early 20th century, a majority of the inhabitants numbering 250 families in the village became part of the Bulgarian Exarchate.

Dendrochori was a Macedonian Bulgarian village of 1650 inhabitants at the beginning of the 20th century. The inhabitants spoke the Dolna Korèshcha variant of the Kostur dialect. Until 1878 the teaching in the local school was in Greek language. In 1878 Trpo Popovski from neighbour village Kosinec (Ieropigi) started to teach the local pupils the Bulgarian language. There were two Bulgarian schools in the village in the beginning of 20th century.

Prior to the Ilinden Uprising, the Battle of Lokvata (May 1903) was fought on a nearby mountain slope by Bulgarian revolutionaries. Involved were inhabitants from the village, chetas (armed groups) and prominent Komitadjis from the surrounding area who inflicted disproportionate casualties on a much larger Ottoman force. The event became a rallying point and served as the basis for a commemorative poem by Lazar Poptraykov, a IMRO Komitadji and native of the village. Among the Slavic speaking villages, it was one of the earliest to rebel in the summer of 1903 against the Ottoman Empire in the Ilinden Uprising. During the conflict, the Ottoman army killed some inhabitants and razed most of village.

The Balkan Wars and the World War I made some inhabitants support and immigrate to Bulgaria. During the interwar period, villagers remained supportive of the Exarchate. From the 1930s and especially 1940s many of its citizens became active in Macedonian separatist and Communist groups, the latter due to the Communists' advocacy on behalf of equal rights for ethnic minorities. In mid 1941, the Battle of Lokvata at its location was commemorated honouring the fallen komitadjis with a large celebration by the village and by other Slavic Macedonians from surrounding villages.

In 1945, Greek Foreign Minister Ioannis Politis ordered the compilation of demographic data regarding the Prefecture of Kastoria. The village Dendrochori had a total of 800 inhabitants, and was populated by 780 Slavophones with a Bulgarian national consciousness. Some 31 inhabitants became members of the Macedonian Brigade and the village sided with the National Liberation Front on the Communist side during the Greek Civil War, and as a result was destroyed. Most villagers were forced into exile, later the village was rebuilt between 1957–1958 and the state repopulated it with Aromanians from Greek Epirus.

A diaspora formed from exiled Slavic speaking inhabitants from the village is spread around the world. The majority reside in North Macedonia and number 204 families. The number of families in other countries are 2 in Albania, 53 in Australia, 15 in Bulgaria, 53 in Canada, 12 in former Czechoslovakia, 4 in Romania, 4 in Serbia, 1 in Slovenia, 5 in the former Soviet Union and 64 in the US. In Greece, 34 families remain and are located in Athens, Florina, Kastoria, Lamia, Piraeus, Volos and Xanthi. The diaspora has retained links and bonds among themselves and memories of their former village, in particular the Battle of Lokvata.

== Notable people ==
- Lazar Poptraykov, Bulgarian Macedonian komitadji and poet
