= Ieropigi =

- Community
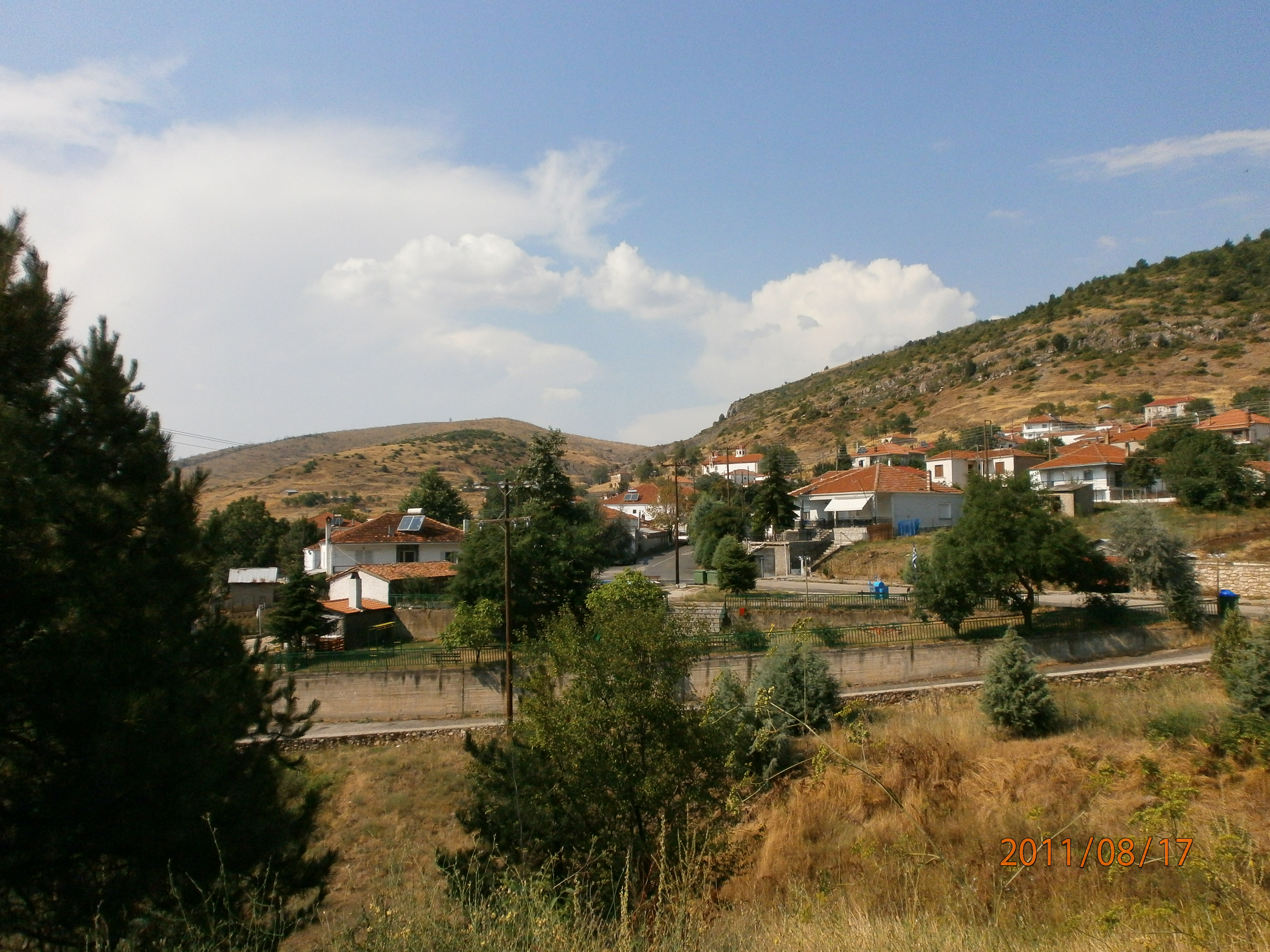

- Location within Greece
- Coordinates: 40°34′44″N 21°4′52″E
- Country: Greece
- Geographic region: Macedonia
- Administrative region: Western Macedonia
- Regional unit: Kastoria
- Municipality: Kastoria
- Municipal unit: Kastraki

Population (2021)
  - Community: 253
- Time zone: UTC+2 (EET)
  - Summer (DST): UTC+3 (EEST)

Ieropigi (Greek: Ιεροπηγή, before 1927: Κοστενέτσι – Kostenetsi; Bulgarian/Macedonian: Косинец - Kosinets/Kosinec) is a village in Kastoria Regional Unit, Macedonia, Greece. The community consists of the villages Ieropigi and Agios Dimitrios.

The 1920 Greek census recorded 563 people in the village. Following the Greek–Turkish population exchange, Greek refugee families in Kostenetsi were from Pontus (11) in 1926. The 1928 Greek census recorded 501 village inhabitants. In 1928, the refugee families numbered 12 (53 people).

In mid–1941 Ieropigi along with Slavic Macedonian inhabitants from several villages partook in a celebration commemorating the Battle of Lokvata, fought by Bulgarian revolutionaries (Komitadjis) against Ottoman soldiers in 1903.

In 1945, Greek Foreign Minister Ioannis Politis ordered the compilation of demographic data regarding the Prefecture of Kastoria. The village Ieropigi had a total of 458 inhabitants, and was populated by 400 Slavophones with a Bulgarian national consciousness. The inhabitants spoke the Dolna Korèshcha variant of the Kostur dialect

By the 1950s, the Greek government assisted a group of nomadic transhumant Aromanians to settle in depopulated villages of the area like Ieropigi. Aromanians are now the only inhabitants of the village.
