= Aaronios =

The Aaronios (Greek: Ἀαρώνιος) or Aaron (Ἀαρών) were a Byzantine noble family of Bulgarian origin, being descended from Emperor Ivan Vladislav of Bulgaria (r. 1015–1018).

After Ivan Vladislav's death before the walls of Dyrrhachium in 1018 and the collapse of the Bulgarian state, his widow, empress Maria, sought refuge in the Byzantine Empire. There Emperor Basil II (r. 976–1025) received her and her offspring and gave them high court titles and offices. The two eldest members of the family, Prousianos and Alousianos were later involved in rebellions. Presianos became implicated in a plot against Emperor Romanos III Argyros (r. 1028–1033) in c. 1029, and Alousianos was actively involved in the Uprising of Petar Delyan in 1040–1041. His daughter married Romanos Diogenes.

The third eldest son, Aaron, served as a high-ranking general and governor of important provinces on the Empire's eastern frontier in the 1040s and 1050s. Strictly speaking, the Aaronios line descended from him, but the name was extended to all descendants of Ivan Vladislav. His son Theodore was killed fighting in Armenia against the Seljuk Turks in 1055/6.

The daughter of the fourth son, Trajan, Maria, married Andronikos Doukas, with whom she had the megas doux John Doukas and Irene Doukaina, wife of Emperor Alexios I Komnenos (r. 1081–1118). Maria's aunt, Catherine, married Emperor Isaac I Komnenos (r. 1057–1059). The family became more obscure in the 12th century, but surviving members are still documented until the late 14th century, albeit in lower-ranking posts.

== Sources ==
- Kazhdan, Alexander, ed. (1991). The Oxford Dictionary of Byzantium. Oxford and New York: Oxford University Press. ISBN 0-19-504652-8.
