= Aaron (son of Ivan Vladislav) =

Younger son of the last tsar

- Died: after 1059
- Occupations: general and military governor
- Parents: Ivan Vladislav of Bulgaria (father); Maria (mother)
- Relatives: Presian, Alusian, Catherine (siblings), Theodore Aaronios (son)
- Family: Cometopuli dynasty/Aaronios family

Aaron (Church Slavonic: А҆арѡ́нъ; Bulgarian: Аарон; Ancient Greek: Ἀαρών) was a younger son of the last Tsar of the First Bulgarian Empire, Ivan Vladislav (r. 1015–1018). After the Byzantine conquest of Bulgaria he entered Byzantine service along with his brothers, and held a series of higher military commands in the eastern provinces of the Byzantine Empire during the 1040s and 1050s, rising from patrikios to protoproedros in the process. In this capacity, he fought in the first battles against the invading Seljuq Turks, and unsuccessfully opposed the uprising of his brother-in-law Isaac I Komnenos in 1057. The Aaronios noble family was named after him, and included his descendants, as well as the descendants of his siblings.

== Life ==
He was the third son of Ivan Vladislav and Maria. He had two older brothers, Presian and Alusian, as well as three younger ones, and six sisters. After the death of Ivan Vladislav in February 1018, Bulgarian resistance to the decades-long attacks of the Byzantine emperor Basil II (r. 976–1025) collapsed, and Aaron with his two older brothers fled to Mount Tmoros in Tomornitsa. Basil surrounded the mountain with troops, and the three brothers eventually surrendered, after receiving guarantees for their safety. Presian received the high title of magistros (suggesting that he was the eldest son, and his father's heir)), while Alusian and Aaron received the slightly lower title of patrikios. Presian was later involved in a plot to usurp the throne from Emperor Romanos III Argyros in c. 1029, resulting in him being blinded and exiled to a monastery, and the second brother, Alusian, was involved in the failed Uprising of Peter Delyan in 1040, usurping its leadership before betraying it to the Byzantines.

=== Military career ===
Aaron himself is known from both literary sources and his seals of office to have served as military governor (katepano) of Vaspurakan in c. 1046/47; at this time, as shown by his seals, he bore the titles of patrikios, anthypatos, and vestes) . During this time Aaron, alongside Katakalon Kekaumenos, the katepano of Ani, faced the first large-scale invasions of the Seljuq Turks into Byzantine-held Armenia. The first invasion, led by Hasan the Deaf, was destroyed by the two Byzantine commanders east of Lake Van in 1048.

Hasan's attack was soon followed by an even larger expedition, led by Ibrahim Inal, which the local Byzantine forces were unable to counter. According to the historian John Skylitzes, contrary to Kekaumenos, who wanted to confront the Turks as soon as possible, Aaron favoured a more defensive stance, withdrawing behind their fortifications and conserving their forces, while informing Emperor Constantine IX (r. 1042–1055) and requesting instructions. Aaron's opinion prevailed, and the Byzantines left the Turks unmolested while they awaited the arrival of reinforcements led by the Georgian prince Liparit. As a result of this inactivity, the Turks were able to raid widely and inflict much destruction, culminating in the dramatic Sack of Artze. After Liparit arrived, the combined army confronted the Turks in the Battle of Kapetron: in a fierce nocturnal engagement, Aaron and Kekaumenos, in command of the two flanks, pushed back and pursued the Turks "till cock's crow". In the centre, however, Inal managed to capture Liparit, which the two Byzantine commanders would not learn until the next day. Inal was able to retreat with his captives and booty to Seljuq territory, leaving the two Byzantine commanders with no option but to return to their respective bases.

He is further attested in inscriptions and seals as doux of Ani and Iberia, with the title of magistros, in c. 1055–1057, and is further identified with Aaron, a magistros and doux of Edessa attested through his seal, although this identification is not certain. During the uprising of the eastern generals under his brother-in-law Isaac I Komnenos in 1057, Aaron remained loyal to Emperor Michael VI (r. 1056–1057), and commanded the left flank of the Imperial army at the decisive Battle of Hades. During the battle, his men routed their opponents and pressed on to their camp, but Aaron hesitated to complete his victory, allowing the rebel army time to reverse the situation and defeat the Imperial forces. The rebel victory quickly led to the accession of Isaac I to the throne.

In c. 1059 he is attested in the testament of Eustathios Boilas as proedros (and presumably doux) in Mesopotamia, then held the office of protostrator along that of doux (the exact command is not specified), and finally, after 1059, the title of protoproedros.

== Family ==
Aaron gave his name to the noble Byzantine family of Aaron or Aaronios (plural: Aaronioi). The family was held to include not only Aaron's descendants, but all descendants of his father John Vladislav; including the Alousianoi, the descendants of his brother Alusian. His son Theodore, governor of Taron, was killed fighting against the Seljuk Turks in 1055/56. He had possibly one other son, Radomir Aaron. From Aaron's younger siblings, the family became closely intermarried with the Komnenos dynasty: his sister Catherine married Isaac Komnenos, the uncle of Emperor Alexios I Komnenos (r. 1081–1118), while the daughter of his younger brother Troian married Andronikos Doukas, the father-in-law of Alexios I.

== Sources ==
- Beihammer, Alexander Daniel (2017). Byzantium and the Emergence of Muslim-Turkish Anatolia, ca. 1040–1130. Taylor & Francis. ISBN 978-1-351-98386-0.
- Kazhdan, Alexander, ed. (1991). The Oxford Dictionary of Byzantium. Oxford and New York: Oxford University Press. ISBN 0-19-504652-8.
- Kühn, Hans-Joachim (1991). Die byzantinische Armee im 10. und 11. Jahrhundert: Studien zur Organisation der Tagmata (in German). Vienna: Fassbaender Verlag. ISBN 3-9005-38-23-9.
- Lilie, Ralph-Johannes; Ludwig, Claudia; Pratsch, Thomas; Zielke, Beate (2013). Prosopographie der mittelbyzantinischen Zeit Online. Berlin-Brandenburgische Akademie der Wissenschaften. Nach Vorarbeiten F. Winkelmanns erstellt (in German). Berlin and Boston: De Gruyter.
- Tăpkova-Zaimova, Vasilka (2018). Bulgarians by Birth: The Comitopuls, Emperor Samuel and their Successors According to Historical Sources and the Historiographic Tradition. Brill. ISBN 978-9-0043-5299-5.
- Wortley, John, ed. (2010). John Skylitzes: A Synopsis of Byzantine History, 811–1057. Cambridge: Cambridge University Press. ISBN 978-0-521-76705-7.
