= 1056 =

1056 in various calendars
- Gregorian calendar: 1056; MLVI
- Ab urbe condita: 1809
- Armenian calendar: 505; ԹՎ ՇԵ
- Assyrian calendar: 5806
- Balinese saka calendar: 977–978
- Bengali calendar: 462–463
- Berber calendar: 2006
- English Regnal year: N/A
- Buddhist calendar: 1600
- Burmese calendar: 418
- Byzantine calendar: 6564–6565
- Chinese calendar: 乙未年 (Wood Goat); 3753 or 3546 — to — 丙申年 (Fire Monkey); 3754 or 3547
- Coptic calendar: 772–773
- Discordian calendar: 2222
- Ethiopian calendar: 1048–1049
- Hebrew calendar: 4816–4817
- Hindu calendars
- Vikram Samvat: 1112–1113
- Shaka Samvat: 977–978
- Kali Yuga: 4156–4157
- Holocene calendar: 11056
- Igbo calendar: 56–57
- Iranian calendar: 434–435
- Islamic calendar: 447–448
- Japanese calendar: Tengi 4 (天喜４年)
- Javanese calendar: 959–960
- Julian calendar: 1056; MLVI
- Korean calendar: 3389
- Minguo calendar: 856 before ROC 民前856年
- Nanakshahi calendar: −412
- Seleucid era: 1367/1368 AG
- Thai solar calendar: 1598–1599
- Tibetan calendar: ཤིང་མོ་ལུག་ལོ་ (female Wood-Sheep); 1182 or 801 or 29 — to — མེ་ཕོ་སྤྲེ་ལོ་ (male Fire-Monkey); 1183 or 802 or 30

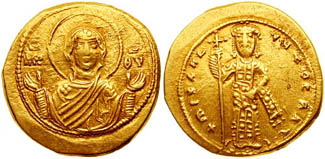
Coin of Emperor Michael VI "the Old", Byzantine emperor 1056–57

Year 1056 (MLVI) was a leap year starting on Monday of the Julian calendar.

== Events ==
=== By place ===
==== Byzantine Empire ====
- August 31 – Empress Theodora (a sister of the former Empress Zoë) dies after a 18-month reign, by a sudden illness at Constantinople. She is succeeded by Michael VI Bringas ("the Old"), who had served as military finance minister under the former Emperor Romanos III. Michael is appointed through the influence of Leo Paraspondylos, Theodora's most trusted adviser. This ends the Macedonian dynasty.
- Theodosius, a nephew of the former Emperor Constantine IX, tries to usurp the Byzantine throne, and liberates all the prisoners who flock to his banner. With their support, he marches through the streets of Constantinople to the Palace. There, the Varangian Guard forms outside to stop him. Theodosius loses heart and heads for Hagia Sophia. Later he is captured, and exiled to Pergamon.

==== Europe ====
- October 5 – Henry III, Holy Roman Emperor ("the Black") dies after a 10-year reign at Bodfeld, an imperial hunting lodge (Königspfalz) in the Harz Mountains. He is succeeded by his 5-year-old only son Henry IV as "king of the Germans" and enthroned by Pope Victor II (also a German) at Aachen – while his mother, Empress Agnes of Poitou, becomes co-regent.
- Ottokar I, count of Steyr, becomes margrave of the Karantanian March (later known as Styria).

==== Britain ====
- June 16 – In response to the attack on Hereford Cathedral in 1055, Leofgar the bishop of Hereford takes an army into Wales to deal with the Welsh prince Gruffydd ap Llywelyn. He along with a large number of English troops is killed in battle at Glasbury-on-Wye by the Welsh. Earl Harold Godwinson raises an army to take revenge, but comes to peaceful terms with Gruffydd.

==== Northern Africa ====
- Battle of Tabfarilla in modern day Mauritania: The Almoravids are crushed by the Godala and their Emir.
- Yahya ibn Umar al-Lamtuni falls.

=== By topic ===
==== Religion ====
- The Pagoda of Fogong Temple at Shanxi in northern China is built during the Liao dynasty. Work begins on the Pizhi Pagoda of Lingyan Temple at Shandong under the opposing Song dynasty.
- Dromtön, an Atiśa chief disciple, founds Reting Monastery in the Reting Tsangpo Valley (north of Lhasa) as the seat of Kadam lineage of Tibetan Buddhism.
- The Muslims expel 300 Christians from Jerusalem, and European Christians are forbidden to enter the Church of the Holy Sepulchre.

== Births ==
- July 24 – Al-Muqtadi, caliph of the Abbasid Caliphate (d. 1094)
- Abdallah ibn Buluggin ("the Conqueror"), emir of Granada
- Baldwin II of Mons, count of Hainaut (approximate date)
- Ermengol IV, Count of Urgell (or Armengol), Spanish nobleman (d. 1092)
- Fujiwara no Kiyohira, Japanese nobleman and samurai (d. 1128)
- Hildegarde of Burgundy, French noblewoman (approximate date)
- Nestor the Chronicler, Russian monk and historian (d. 1114) (approximate date)
- Sæmundr fróði (Sæmundur Sigfússon), Icelandic priest and scholar (d. 1133)
- Zhou Bangyan, Chinese bureaucrat and ci poet (d. 1121)

== Deaths ==
- February 10 – Æthelstan, English bishop of Hereford
- February 11 – Herman II (or Heriman), archbishop of Cologne
- June 16 – Leofgar (or Leovegard), English bishop of Hereford, killed in battle
- August 31
  - Odda of Deerhurst, English nobleman
  - Theodora, empress regnant of the Byzantine Empire
- September 10 – William, margrave of the Nordmark
- October 5 – Henry III ("the Black"), Holy Roman Emperor (b. 1017)
- November 25 – Flann Mainistreach, Irish poet and historian
- Áed Ua Forréid, bishop of Armagh (Church of Ireland)
- Anselm of Liège, French chronicler (approximate date)
- Benedict IX, pope of the Catholic Church (approximate date)
- Ekkehard IV, Swiss monk and chronicler (approximate date)
- Hilal al-Sabi', Buyid historian, bureaucrat and writer
- Leo of Ohrid, Byzantine archbishop and theologian
- Yahya ibn Umar al-Lamtuni, Almoravid chieftain
