= Battle of Petroe =

Battle between two rival Byzantine armies in 1057

Coordinates: 40°29′13″N 29°41′26″E

| Date | 20 August 1057 |
| Location | Plain of Ha[i]des, near Nicaea |
| Result | Rebel victory |

Belligerents
| Imperial forces of Michael VI Stratiotikos | Rebel forces of Isaac I Komnenos |

Commanders and leaders
| Theodore; Aaron; Basil Tarchaneiotes | Isaac I Komnenos; Katakalon Kekaumenos; Romanos Skleros; Nikephoros Botaneiates |

Casualties and losses
| Heavy | Significant |
- Approximate location within modern Turkey

The Battle of Petroe, also known as the Battle of Hades, was fought on 20 August 1057 between two rival Byzantine armies: the loyalist forces of the Byzantine emperor Michael VI Stratiotikos (r. 1056–1057) under the proedros Theodore, and the supporters of the rebel general Isaac Komnenos.

Disgruntled by the neglect of army finances and the Emperor's unwillingness to consider their grievances, Komnenos and other leading commanders, including Nikephoros Bryennios and Nikephoros Botaneiates, began plotting against Michael VI, and on 8 June 1057, Komnenos was proclaimed emperor at his estates in Cappadocia. After his supporters rallied regiments from Anatolia to his cause, his army marched west towards Constantinople, and encountered the loyalist army, composed largely of regiments from Europe, near the city of Nicaea.

After confronting each other for several days, the two armies finally engaged at the plain of Hades. Although the right wing of the rebel army was beaten, Komnenos himself held firm in the centre. Victory was won by his left wing, led by Katakalon Kekaumenos, which routed the imperial right, reached and entered their camp, and destroyed their tents, causing the imperial army to break and run, leaving the way open to Constantinople. With the rebel army approaching the capital, Michael VI offered Komnenos the position of Caesar and heir-apparent, but he was quickly convinced to abdicate the throne. On the next day, 1 September 1057, Isaac Komnenos was crowned emperor in Constantinople. His reign was marked by his unsuccessful attempts to reform the administration and strengthen the empire, but the opposition he aroused led to his own abdication in November 1059.

== Background ==
The Byzantine Empire at the time of the Battle of Petroe.

When Empress Theodora, the last member of the Macedonian dynasty, died in 1056, the court circle around the Empress, dominated by her household eunuchs under Leo Paraspondylos, selected Michael VI Bringas as her successor. A career bureaucrat, Michael was a weak and pliant ruler dominated by the eunuchs. Given his advanced years and lack of children, his reign was perceived as weak and unlikely to last from the start, and was plagued by rebellions. Michael VI engaged in massive promotions of individuals, but restricted this to the civilian bureaucracy, and neglected the military. This was not a trivial matter: the debasement of the Byzantine currency under Constantine IX Monomachos (r. 1042–1054) had affected military pay—not coincidentally presided over by none other than Michael Bringas, who was then military logothete—and while civil officials were compensated by being raised to higher dignities, the army officers were not. This exacerbated the already simmering dislike of the military aristocracy for what, in the words of the Byzantinist Anthony Kaldellis, they considered as the "regime of eunuchs and civilian politicians" that had dominated the empire during the last decades of the Macedonian dynasty.

During Easter 1057, a delegation of leading generals under Isaac Komnenos, Katakalon Kekaumenos, Michael Bourtzes, Constantine Doukas and John Doukas, appeared before the Emperor to request similar promotions. According to the eyewitness Michael Psellos, the Emperor began abusing them at once; he then made Isaac, as the leader of the deputation, and his second, Kekaumenos, stand forth, and proceeded to denounce Isaac, claiming that he was responsible for "all but losing Antioch" and "corrupting his army", being a coward and incompetent, and of having misappropriated army funds for his own use. The effect of the Emperor's attitude on the army leadership was profound, and turned them against Michael. A second delegation, this time to Strabospondylos, was received in similar manner, and a plot was formed against the Emperor, with Isaac Komnenos as its leader.

The conspirators contacted the veteran general Nikephoros Bryennios, who had unsuccessfully tried to usurp the throne from Theodora, but had recently been recalled by Michael VI as commander of the Macedonian army, and he apparently agreed to support them. Soon after, Bryennios left with his troops for Asia Minor, to campaign against the Turks. Once in the Anatolic Theme, he quarrelled with the army treasurer, the patrikios John Opsaras. Bryennios not only imprisoned Opsaras, but also appropriated the army chest that Opsaras carried with him, and began to pay the soldiers as he saw fit. This act did not go unnoticed by another local commander, the patrikios Lykanthes, who regarded it as an attempt at rebellion. Lykanthes marched against Bryennios, arrested him and handed him over to Opsaras, who had Bryennios blinded.

== Initial moves ==
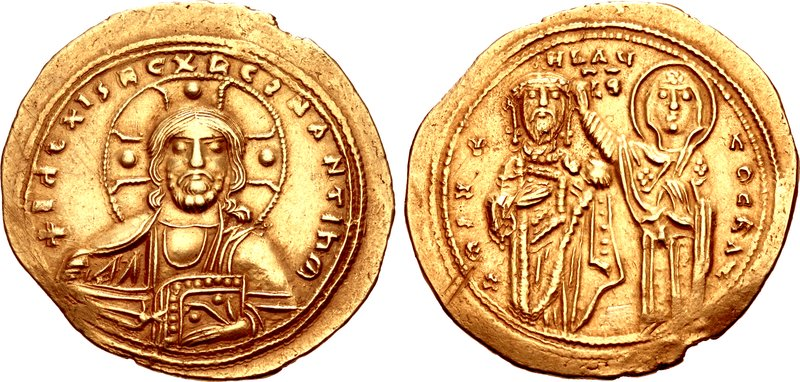
A gold histamenon showing Michael VI in imperial regalia, being crowned by the Theotokos

Fearing that their plot was about to be discovered, the eastern generals felt forced to act. The conspirators resident in the Anatolic Theme, Romanos Skleros, Michael Bourtzes, Nikephoros Botaneiates and the sons of Basil Argyros, hastened to find Isaac Komnenos at his estates near Kastamon in Paphlagonia, and on 8 June 1057, at a place called Gounaria, proclaimed him emperor. It is unclear whether any of the rebels held command of troops; rather, according to Kaldellis, "they had to canvass for support among the officers and soldiers and forge orders of imperial appointment for themselves". Thus the near-contemporary historian John Skylitzes reports that Kekaumenos had to forge imperial letters to mobilize the regiments (tagmata) of the Armeniac Theme, ostensibly to march against the Seljuk chieftain Samouch. Of these regiments, three were composed of mercenaries—two Frankish and one Russian—and two were native Byzantine—those of Koloneia and Chaldia. Gathering these forces on the plain of Nikopolis, Kekaumenos marched west to join Komnenos.

At the same time, the western regiments, and the eastern ones of the Anatolic Theme and of Charsianon, remained loyal to Michael VI. The Emperor placed this force under the command of Theodora's eunuch favourite, the proedros Theodore, who was the domestikos ton scholon (commander-in-chief) of the east, and the magistros Aaron, Isaac's brother-in-law; unlike previously, he now "showered the commanders and the soldiers with honours, gifts and extravagant grants of money" to secure their allegiance. The loyalist army crossed over into Anatolia at Chrysopolis and assembled at Nicomedia, controlling the direct route to the capital. Advance detachments were sent to demolish the Sangarius Bridge, while the army established a fortified camp at Mount Sophon (modern Sapanca Dağı). Leaving his family with his brother at the fortress of Pemolissa on the banks of the Halys River, Komnenos in turn slowly advanced west towards Constantinople. Finding the imperial army blocking the direct route to the capital, Komnenos turned south and seized Nicaea as his base of operations. He then established his own fortified camp some 12 stadia (c. 2.2 km, 1.4 mi) north of the city.

== Battle ==
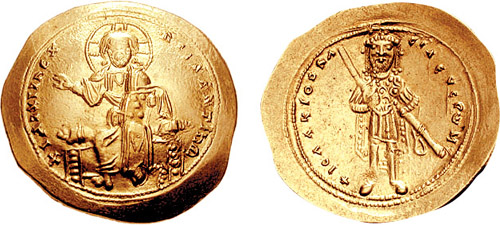
Gold histamenon struck by Isaac I Komnenos. His martial posture, bearing a naked sword, is unique among Byzantine imperial coinage.

Both sides sent soldiers out to forage and collect wood, and over several days, the soldiers from both camps, often friends or relatives, met one another and tried to persuade the other side to defect. Initially, the commanders of the two armies tried to take advantage of this, sending "men skilled in argument" to induce the other side to defect, but without much effect. Eventually Isaac Komnenos ordered his men to stay closer to their camp, and to be more careful in contact with the loyalists. This was interpreted by the loyalist soldiers as a sign of weakness, and they urged the proedros Theodore to fight. Reluctantly, the latter agreed to leave Sophon and encamp at Petroe, some 15 stadia (c. 2.8 km, 1.7 mi) from the rebel camp.

Finally, on 20 August, Komnenos marched out his forces and arrayed them for battle on a plain called, according to Michael Attaleiates, Polemon or Hades (Haides according to Skylitzes). Kekaumenos commanded the left wing; Romanos Skleros the right; and Komnenos positioned himself in the centre. On the imperial side, the magistros Aaron was stationed on the left wing with Lykanthes, Pnyemios the Iberian (commander of the forces of Charsianon) and the patrikios Randolf the Frank as his lieutenants; Basil Tarchaneiotes (the stratelates of the western armies) was positioned on the right; and the centre was commanded by the proedros Theodore.

In the ensuing battle, the imperial left wing under Aaron completely routed the rebel right wing. Pursuing them to the rebel camp, he captured Romanos Skleros there and was on the cusp of seizing the rebel camp and victory along with it: Skylitzes reports that Komnenos was on the verge of fleeing to Nicaea. However, Aaron hesitated, and allowed the rebel army time to reverse the situation. In the centre, Komnenos held out against heavy loyalist pressure. Psellos reports that four "Tauroscythian" (an anachronistic term for the Russians) mercenaries tried to kill him, but failed; indeed, by attacking him simultaneously from two sides, their lances got stuck in his armour and kept him aloft, balanced in the middle. On the rebel left, Kekaumenos routed the loyalist right, breaching their camp and destroying their tents. As the camp was situated on a height and was widely visible, this encouraged the rebels and dejected the loyalists, who collapsed and fled. Although Skylitzes writes that "many more were taken prisoner than were killed" in the subsequent pursuit, the loyalists suffered many killed, including the generals Maurokatakalos, Pnyemios and Katzamountes. Nikephoros Botaneiates won particular renown at this point: Randolf the Frank was caught up in the rout when he saw Botaneiates leading an attacking division. Shouting a war cry, Randolf turned and attacked Botaneiates; the two engaged in single combat until Randolf's sword broke and he was captured.

== Aftermath ==
While the remnants of the imperial army withdrew to the capital, Komnenos moved to occupy Nicomedia. There he was met on 24 August by envoys of the Emperor: Michael Psellos, and the proedroi Constantine Leichoudes and Theodore Alopos, who offered him the title of Caesar—at that time the highest title of the Byzantine court, signifying the designated heir-apparent—if he would cease his rebellion. Although these proposals were publicly rejected, privately Komnenos showed himself more open to negotiation, and he was promised the status of co-emperor. During the course of these secret negotiations, a riot in favour of Komnenos broke out in Constantinople. By the time the envoys returned to the capital on 29 August, they had espoused the rebels' cause, and, aided by patriarch Michael Keroularios, they began to conspire in his favour. On 31 August, Keroularios convinced Michael VI to abdicate in favour of Komnenos, who entered Constantinople on 1 September and was crowned emperor the same day.

With the Macedonian dynasty extinct, Isaac thus became the first military strongman to usurp power outright since the 9th century; other powerful generals, such as Romanos I Lekapenos (r. 920–944) or Nikephoros II Phokas (r. 963–969) had also usurped the throne under the Macedonian emperors, but they had reigned alongside the legitimate rulers. This was reflected in the coinage struck in his name, which uniquely showed him holding a drawn sword; while it may have simply indicated his intention to restore "capable military rule" (Kaldellis), it came to be understood as a claim to rule by right of conquest, and even as expressing an impious belief "that his accomplishments came not from God but from his own prowess". Isaac attempted to reform the bureaucracy and the empire's fiscal system, as well as to restore its military strength, but his reforms aroused much opposition; increasingly isolated politically, and probably disheartened, during an illness in November 1059 he abdicated in favour of Constantine Doukas.

== Sources ==
=== Primary sources ===
- Kaldellis, Anthony; Krallis, Dimitris, eds. (2012). Michael Attaleiates: The History. Cambridge, MA and London: Harvard University Press. ISBN 978-0-674-05799-9.
- Sewter, Edgar Robert Ashton, ed. (1953). The Chronographia of Michael Psellus. New Haven, Connecticut: Yale University Press. OCLC 422765673.
- Wortley, John, ed. (2010). John Skylitzes: A Synopsis of Byzantine History, 811–1057. Cambridge: Cambridge University Press. ISBN 978-0-521-76705-7.

=== Secondary sources ===
- Kaldellis, Anthony (2017). Streams of Gold, Rivers of Blood: The Rise and Fall of Byzantium, 955 A.D. to the First Crusade. New York: Oxford University Press. ISBN 978-0-1902-5322-6.
- Kazhdan, Alexander, ed. (1991). The Oxford Dictionary of Byzantium. Oxford and New York: Oxford University Press. ISBN 0-19-504652-8.
- Treadgold, Warren (1997). A History of the Byzantine State and Society. Stanford, California: Stanford University Press. ISBN 0-8047-2630-2.
- Vogt, Albert (1923). "The Macedonian Dynasty from 976 to 1057 A.D.". The Cambridge Medieval History, Vol. IV: The Eastern Roman Empire (717–1453). Cambridge: Cambridge University Press. pp. 83–118. OCLC 895446365.
