= Presian =

Presian may refer to:

- Presian of Bulgaria, khan of Bulgaria in 836–852
- Presian (son of Ivan Vladislav) (died 1060/61), heir of the last tsar of the First Bulgarian Empire
