= Emperor Isaac =

Emperor Isaac may refer to:

- Isaac I Komnenos, Byzantine emperor (1057–1059)
- Isaac II Angelos, Byzantine emperor (1185–1195, 1203–1204)
