= Ivan Vladislav of Bulgaria =

Tsar of Bulgaria from 1015 to 1018

Ivan Vladislav Иван Владислав
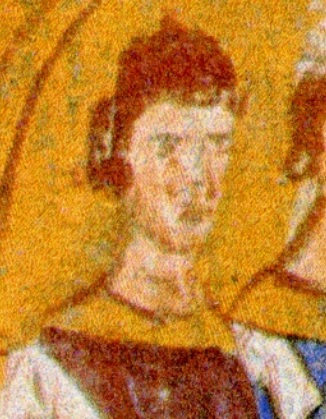
- Ivan Vladislav in the Madrid Skylitzes (12th century)

Tsar of Bulgaria
- Reign: August 1015 – February 1018
- Predecessor: Gavril Radomir of Bulgaria
- Died: February 1018; Dyrrhachium
- Spouses: Maria
- Issue: Presian; Aron; Alusian; Troian; Catherine
- Dynasty: Cometopuli
- Father: Aron

Ivan Vladislav (Church Slavonic: Їѡаннъ Владиславъ; Bulgarian: Иван/Йоан Владислав; died February 1018) served as the emperor (tsar) of the First Bulgarian Empire from approximately August or September 1015 until February 1018. The precise year of his birth remains elusive; he was born at least ten years prior to 987, but likely not much earlier than that.

Saved from death by his cousin Gavril Radomir, the Bulgarian Emperor, in 976, Ivan Vladislav murdered him in October 1015 and seized the Bulgarian throne. Due to the desperate situation of the country following the decades-long war with the Byzantine Empire, and in an attempt to consolidate his position, he tried to negotiate truce with the Byzantine emperor Basil II. After the failure of the negotiations he continued the resistance, attempting unsuccessfully to push the Byzantines back. During his period of rule, Ivan Vladislav tried to strengthen the Bulgarian army, reconstructed many Bulgarian fortresses and even carried out a counter-offensive, but he died at the Battle of Dyrrhachium in 1018. After his death his widow, Empress Maria, the Patriarch and most of the nobility finally surrendered to Basil II, who soon suppressed the last remnants of resistance and brought about the end of the First Bulgarian Empire.

Ivan Vladislav left a mixed heritage, varying from a reputation of being a ruthless murderer to a hero defending his country as well as he could. The descendants of Ivan Vladislav entered the Byzantine nobility and rose to the highest ranks of the hierarchy. Two women of his family became empresses of the Byzantine Empire and others became military commanders or high-ranking officials. He was an ancestor of the Byzantine emperor John II Komnenos.

== Biography ==
=== Early life ===
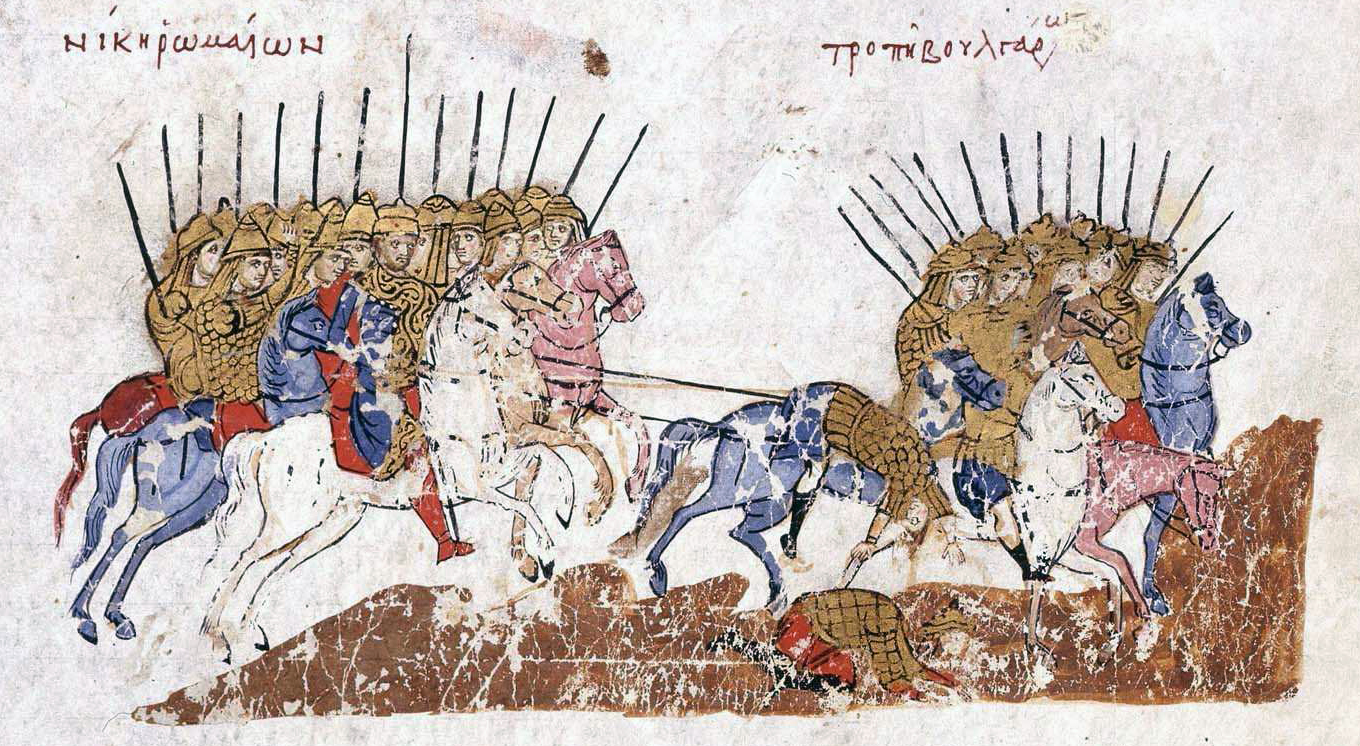
A victory of the Byzantines over the Bulgarians, from the Madrid Skylitzes. After 1001 Basil II launched annual campaigns on Bulgarian territory, reversing the odds of war into the Byzantines' favour. Many Bulgarian fortresses had been conquered by force or treason by the time Ivan Vladislav came to the throne.

Ivan Vladislav was the son of Aron, the brother of Emperor Samuel (r. 997–1014) of the Cometopuli dynasty. In 976 or 987 Samuel ordered his brother Aron executed for treason together with his entire family near Razmetanitsa. Ivan Vladislav was the only survivor, being spared through the intercession of his cousin, Samuel's son Gavril Radomir. His life during the subsequent decades and until his accession is unknown.

=== Assumption of power ===
By 1015, Bulgaria had been embroiled in almost thirty years of war with the Byzantine Empire, and Gavril Radomir had succeeded Samuel, who died on 6 October 1014 after the disastrous Battle of Kleidion. However, from the outset Radomir's position was insecure: Ivan Vladislav, as a son of the elder of the Cometopouli brothers, could lay claim on the throne based on seniority. During that time the Byzantine Emperor Basil II campaigned deep into Bulgarian territory. He retook the previously lost town of Voden (Edessa) and laid siege to the massive fortress of Maglen, situated to the north-west. Gavril Radomir did not have enough forces and was unable to interfere and could only watch the course of the events from the nearby Lake Ostrovo. His inability to cope with the Byzantine threat aroused discontent among the nobility and Ivan Vladislav became their chosen leader. The fall of Maglen sealed Gavril Radomir's fate—in the late summer of 1015, while hunting near Ostrovo (Arnissa), he was murdered by his cousin, perhaps at the behest of Byzantine agents. Ivan Vladislav then seized the Bulgarian throne and took steps to ensure his position against potential rivals.

=== First months of reign ===
After assuming the throne, Ivan Vladislav immediately sent a delegation to Basil II, which arrived five days after the fall of Maglen. In his letter, Ivan Vladislav notified Basil that he had personally murdered Gavril Radomir and had seized all the power in the country and promised Basil deep humility and obedience, an act of submission which some in the nobility supported. After Ivan Vladislav firmly secured his hold on the throne, however, he openly declared to be against any kind of compromise with the Byzantines and quickly began to follow the determined policy of his predecessors against the ongoing Byzantine conquest. Basil II soon understood that Ivan Vladislav's letter was a ruse and plotted a retaliatory action, bribing the kavkhan Theodore, who was in Byzantine captivity, to murder the Bulgarian ruler. Theodore in turn paid a trusted man in Ivan Vladislav's employ to commit the murder, but in the event the assassin actually killed Theodore himself. In the meantime Basil II continued his march, forcing the Bulgarian emperor to retreat to the Albanian mountains, and advanced into the heart of the Bulgarian state. The Byzantines took the capital Ohrid and burned the imperial palaces; news, however, arrived that Ivan Vladislav had laid siege to Dyrrhachium and that to the south the Bulgarian general Ibatzes had defeated the Byzantine rear army in a battle near Bitola. With his supply routes cut, Basil II had to retreat back to Thessalonica leaving a small garrison in Ohrid, which was swiftly retaken by the Bulgarians. Back in his base at Mosynopolis, Basil divided the Byzantine army to harass the areas of Strumitsa and Sofia. In January 1016 the Byzantine emperor returned to Constantinople.

=== Consolidation ===
Meanwhile, Ivan Vladislav consolidated his positions in the mountains of Albania and Macedonia. As early as October 1015 he began the reconstruction of many strongholds destroyed during the war, including the fortress at Bitola (as testified in the Bitola inscription). In 1016 he invited his vassal Prince Jovan Vladimir of Doclea, who was married to Gabriel Radomir's sister Theodora Kosara, to come to his court. The emperor probably desired to seize the prince and so secure his western flank. The Prince was determined to attend the invitation of Tsar, but his wife Theodora Kosara did not trust the murderer of her brother, and fearing for her husband's life persuaded him not to go. Ivan Vladislav however vowed not to threaten his vassal's life, and sent him a golden cross as a proof of good will. Jovan Vladimir still hesitated, saying that God was nailed to a wooden not golden cross, but Ivan Vladislav repeated his vow and gave him a guarantee of safe-conduct, also guaranteed by the Bulgarian patriarch David. Eventually Jovan Vladimir travelled to the court of the Tsar in Prespa, but upon his arrival on 22 May, he was immediately beheaded, and the emperor refused to allow the burial of his body. It was not until a number of miraculous events related to the corpse of the prince were observed that Vladislav returned the body to Kosara.

In the spring of 1016 Basil II led his armies along the Struma valley and besieged the strong fortress of Pernik. The fort's defence was headed by the capable commander Krakra, who remained loyal to the Bulgarian cause. As all the previous attempts against Pernik, the 88-day siege was a failure, costing the Byzantines many casualties before they were forced to retreat south and regroup at Mosynopolis.

=== Fighting in 1017 ===
In the early days of 1017 the Byzantine emperor renewed his campaigns. He sent David Arianites and Constantine Diogenes to pillage along the River Vardar and captured the castle of Longos. After that he marched south and besieged Kastoria. Under the walls of the town Basil II received messages from Tzitzikios, the Byzantine strategos of Dorostolon (Silistra), that Ivan Vladislav had sent Krakra to negotiate assistance from the Pechenegs and that they were crossing the Danube. The Byzantine emperor immediately abandoned the siege and hurried northwards, but in the vicinity of Lake Ostrovo he learned that the Pechenegs were unwilling to risk war. Returning south, Basil II captured Setina, where Samuel used to have a palace and acquired for himself the large amount of provisions that were stored there. Ivan Vladislav, who was closely monitoring the Byzantine movements, ambushed the troops who were under the command of Constantine Diogenes, who would have perished had not Basil II come to relieve him. According to John Skylitzes, the Emperor charged alone in front of his army to Diogenes' rescue. When the Bulgarians saw him, they shouted "Run, the Emperor" ("Βεγεῖτε Τσαῖσαρ") and retreated in panic. Contented with their victory, the Byzantines moved on to Voden and returned to Constantinople.

=== Death ===
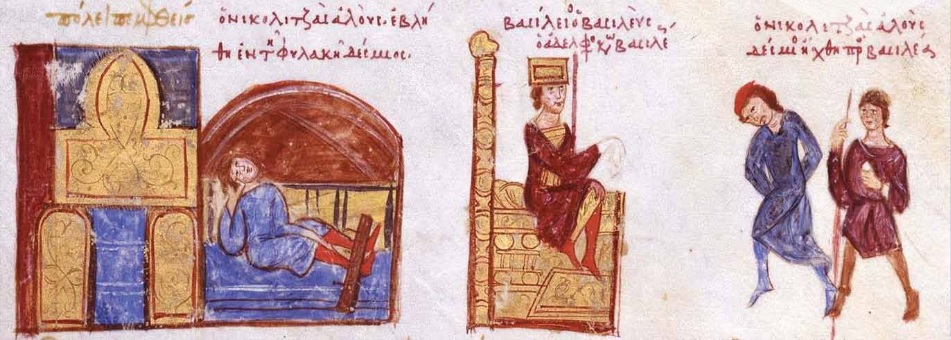
The capture of Nikulitsa by the Byzantines. The death of Ivan Vladislav was a blow for the Bulgarian resistance. Only a few nobles continued the struggle with the Byzantines such as Ibatzes and Nikulitsa.

In the early 1018 Ivan Vladislav besieged Dyrrhachium, but in February he was killed under the walls of the city. The accounts of his death are contradictory. According to some he became victim of a plot and was killed by his servants; according to others, he perished in battle. The Bulgarian additions to the Skylitzes Chronicle are more detailed, saying that Ivan Vladislav dueled with the strategos of Dyrrhachium, the patrikios Niketas Pegonites, on horseback, and while fighting, two Byzantine infantrymen from the audience rushed to the emperor and wounded him mortally in the belly. A later Byzantine historian claimed that the duel was fair and Pegonites stabbed Ivan Vladislav in the chest with his spear, killing him instantly. The Chronicle of the Priest of Duklja reports an altogether different story: while having a meal in his camp, the emperor was attacked by an unknown soldier, in whom Ivan Vladislav seemed to have recognized the murdered Jovan Vladimir. Terrified, he cried for help but no one rushed to his rescue and the unknown soldier mortally wounded the Bulgarian ruler.

His death marked the effective end of the Bulgarian Empire. Ivan Vladislav's sons were young and inexperienced, and even the strongest Bulgarian leaders doubted the advisability of further resistance. Upon learning of the death of the Tsar, Basil II left Constantinople. In Adrianople he was met by the brother of Krakra who acknowledged Byzantine authority. His example was followed by the larger part of the Bulgarian nobility who pledged loyalty to Basil II, giving up their fortresses. In Serres, Krakra along with the commanders of 35 castles met the emperor and surrendered, and in Strumitsa he received a message sent by the Empress-dowager Maria to negotiate the surrender of the capital and the country. Basil II richly awarded those who surrendered, allowing them to keep their lands, wealth and titles. Short-lived resistance continued under Ivan Vladislav's eldest son Presian and his brothers, but they also surrendered by the end of 1018.

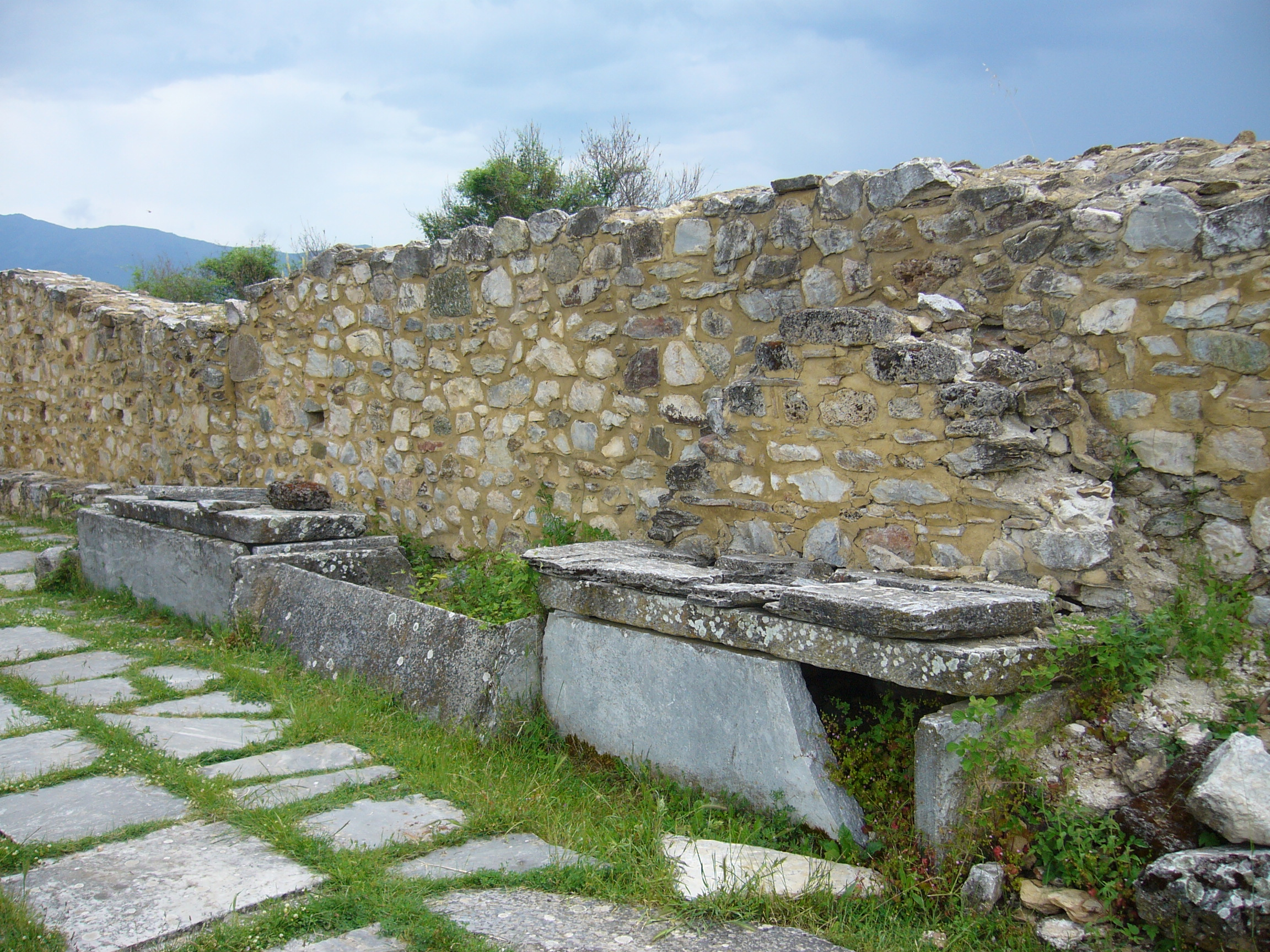
The sarcophagi of Bulgarian Tsars Samuil, Gavril Radomir and Ivan Vladislav in Agios Achilios, Greece.

== Legacy ==
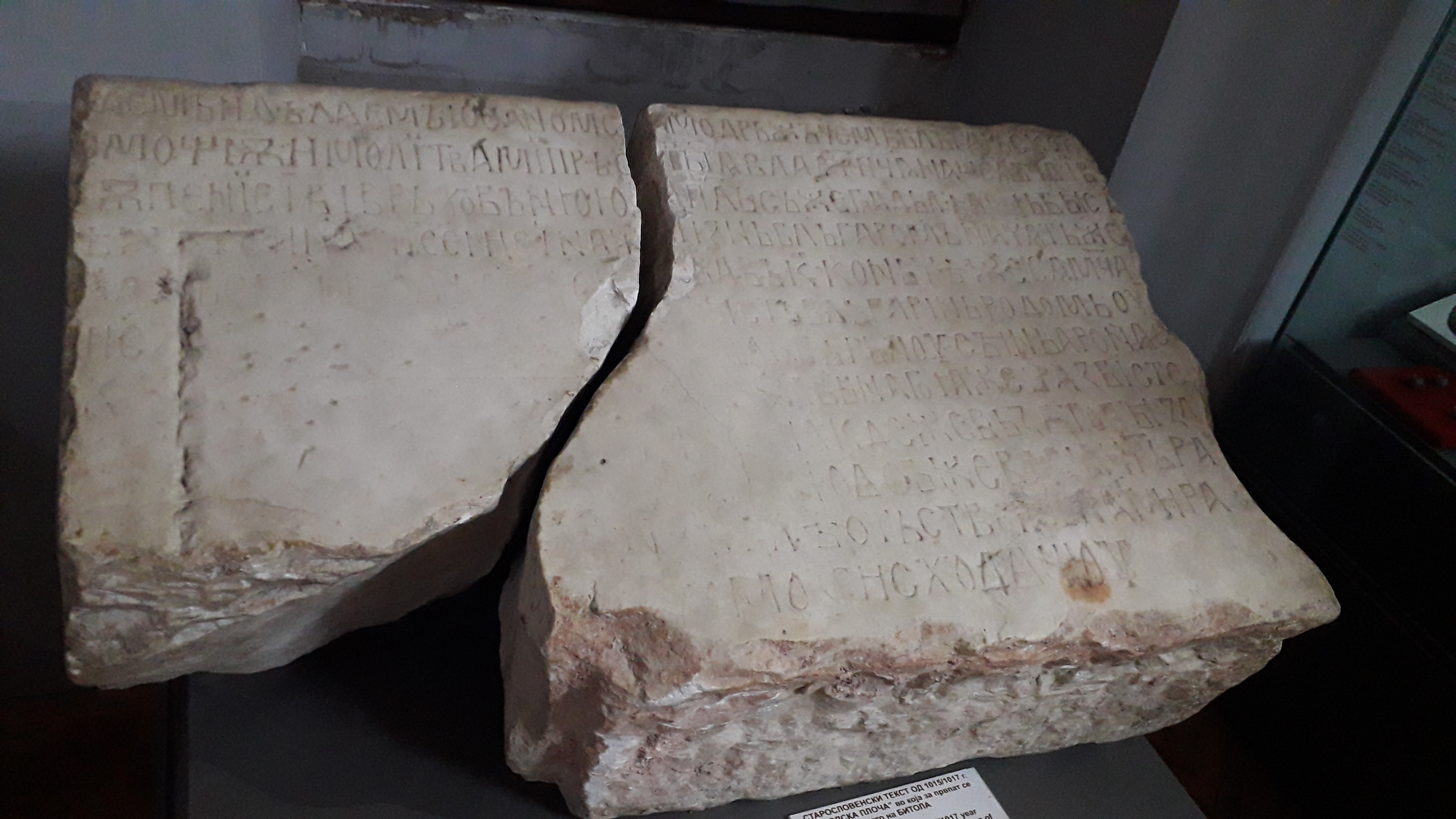
The Bitola inscription is a medieval stone inscription written in Old Church Slavonic during the Ivan Vladislav's reign. He is titled "autocrat of the Bulgarians", "born Bulgarian" and notes that he renewed the fortress of Bitola for "a salvation and sanctuary of the Bulgarians".

Living more than one hundred years after Ivan Vladislav, the historian known as the Priest of Duklja, who wrote from a Dukljan perspective, was outraged by the murder of Jovan Vladimir, and wrote that after the Tsar died, he was "forever connected with the angels of Satan". Many modern Bulgarian historians, including Vasil Zlatarski, also criticize the emperor, claiming that his actions hastened the fall of Bulgaria and that instead of raising the morale of the nation he turned into a murderer and was unable to cope with the intrigues and the corruption in court. Steven Runciman is also critical of the emperor, noting that his assassination of Gavril Radomir unleashed a general confusion where each noble started looking out for his own personal interests, but nevertheless credits him with "a considerable ruthless energy". Jordan Andreev is more favourable to Ivan Vladislav, noting that he had reasons for his acts—he had to revenge the murder of his family according to the old Bulgarian pagan beliefs, but he only killed Gavril Radomir and his wife without harming the rest of Gavril Radomir's family. He had to cope with Jovan Vladimir who, as a husband of one of Samuel's daughters, was a threat to his position, and had also attempted a compromise with the Byzantines. According to Andreev, Ivan Vladislav's struggle to defend the Bulgarian state and his heroic death serve to mitigate his ill deeds. He cites a Byzantine historian who claimed that during Ivan Vladislav's reign the Byzantine state "hanged in the balance, because that barbarian like Goliath resisted the Romans and they were all despaired by that invincible foe." The Polish historian Kazimierz Zakrzewski also writes with sympathy for the last ruler of the First Empire, in light of the fact that Ivan Vladislav managed to sustain a guerilla war which he skilfully ran until his death.

Ivan Vladislav Point on Rugged Island in the South Shetland Islands, Antarctica, is named after Ivan Vladislav of Bulgaria.

== Family ==
Ivan Vladislav married Maria, possibly the daughter of Tsar Boris II of Bulgaria and a Byzantine noblewoman, by whom he left progeny. Maria was named zoste patrikia by Basil II, and the descendants of Ivan Vladislav entered Byzantine service, becoming part of the Byzantine nobility and forming close ties with the Komnenos clan in particular. Both his daughter Catherine and an unnamed (possibly Anna) granddaughter married (future) Byzantine emperors. His second son Alusian took part in the Uprising of Petar Delyan against Byzantine rule but eventually betrayed the Bulgarian cause.

Maria and Ivan Vladislav had several children, including:

1. Presian, later Byzantine magistros
2. Alusian, Byzantine patrikios in 1019, strategos of Theodosiopolis in Anatolia, briefly emperor of Bulgaria in 1041
3. Aaron, Byzantine general
4. Trayan / Troianus, father of Maria of Bulgaria, who married Andronikos Doukas.
5. Catherine (Ekaterina), who married the future Byzantine Emperor Isaac I Komnenos

Family tree of Ivan Vladislav
Comita Nikola	Ripsimia
David	Moses	Aron	Samuel (reign 997–1014)	Agatha daughter of John Chryselios
Gavril Radomir († 1015, reign 1014–1015)	Theodora Kosara	Miroslava
Maria	Ivan Vladislav (reign 1015–1018)
Alusian	Aaron	Radomir	Catherine wife of Isaac I Komnenos
Presian	Trayan	Unknown son	5 unknown daughters
Anna first wife of Romanos IV Diogenes	Basil	Theodore	Maria wife of Andronikos Doukas	Manuel	Maria
Samuel commander in Armenia	Radomir
Constantine Diogenes husband of Theodora Komnene, the sister of Alexios I Komnenos	Aaron Aaronios conspired against Alexios I Komnenos in 1107	Irene Doukaina wife of Alexios I Komnenos	Theodora	John Doukas megas doux
Anna wife of George Palaiologos	Michael Doukas protostrator

== Notes ==
a: Andreev does not specify in the book the name the Byzantine historian he has cited.

== Sources ==
- Andreev, Jordan; Milcho Lalkov (1996). The Bulgarian Khans and Tsars (in Bulgarian). Abagar. ISBN 954-427-216-X.
- Fine, John V. A. (1994) [1987]. The Late Medieval Balkans: A Critical Survey from the Late Twelfth Century to the Ottoman Conquest. Ann Arbor, Michigan: University of Michigan Press. ISBN 978-0-472-10079-8.
- Gyuzelev, Vasil (1986). The Middle Ages in Bulgaria (in Polish) (Polish ed.). Warsaw: Książka i Wiedza. ISBN 83-05-11583-6.
- Kazhdan, Alexander, ed. (1991). The Oxford Dictionary of Byzantium. Oxford and New York: Oxford University Press. ISBN 0-19-504652-8.
- Runciman, Steven (1930). "The End of an Empire". A History of the First Bulgarian Empire. London: George Bell & Sons. OCLC 832687.
- Stawowy-Kawka, Irena (2000). History of Macedonia (in Polish). Wrocław: Ossolineum. ISBN 83-04-04549-4.
- Settipani, Christian (2006), Continuité des élites à Byzance durant les siècles obscurs. Les princes caucasiens et l'Empire du VIe au IXe siècle, Paris: De Boccard.
- Wasilewski, Tadeusz (1988). History of Bulgaria (in Polish). Wrocław: Ossolineum. ISBN 83-04-02466-7.
- Zlatarski, Vasil (1971) [1927]. История на българската държава през средните векове. Том I. История на Първото българско царство, Част II. От славянизацията на държавата до падането на Първото царство (852—1018) [History of Bulgaria in the Middle Ages. Vol. 1. History of the First Bulgarian Empire, Part 2.From the Slavicization of the state to the fall of the First Empire (852—1018)]. Sofia: Nauka i izkustvo. OCLC 67080314.

Preceded by Gabriel Radomir	Emperor of Bulgaria; 1015–1018	Byzantine conquest of Bulgaria
