= Maria (wife of Ivan Vladislav) =

Maria of Bulgaria

Empress consort of Bulgaria
- Tenure: 1015–1018
- Born: c. 960; Bulgaria
- Died: after 1029; Thracesian Theme
- Spouse: Ivan Vladislav, Tsar of Bulgaria
- Issue: Presian II; Aron; Alusian, Tsar of Bulgaria; Troian; Catherine, Byzantine Empress
- House: Krum's dynasty
- Father: Boris II

Maria (Church Slavonic: Маrі́а Bulgarian: Мария) was the last empress consort (tsaritsa) of the First Bulgarian Empire. She was the wife of Tsar Ivan Vladislav of Bulgaria and was involved in political manoeuvring.

== Life ==
Maria was a daughter of Boris II, tsar of Bulgaria from 969-977 (though he spent 971-977 as a captive of the Byzantines). It is believed that Maria was married to Ivan Vladislav in the late 10th century.

Her husband's father was Aron, the brother of Tsar Samuel (Samuil) of Bulgaria; Samuil had succeeded her father. In 987 Samuel ordered his brother Aron executed for treason together with his entire family. The massacre was survived only by Ivan Vladislav, who was saved through the intercession of his cousin, Samuel's son Gabriel Radomir.

Tsar Samuil died in 1014 and the Bulgarian throne was inherited by his son Gavril Radomir. In 1015 Ivan Vladislav avenged the deaths of his innocent siblings by murdering his savior Gavrail Radomir, while the latter was hunting near Ostrovo (Arnissa), and seized the Bulgarian throne.

Maria's husband followed the determined policy of his predecessors to resist the ongoing Byzantine conquest over Bulgaria, but he was killed before the walls of Dyrrhachium in the winter of 1018. After his death the widowed empress Maria and much of the Bulgarian nobility and court submitted to the advancing Basil II and negotiated guarantees for the preservation of their lives, status, and property. Maria together with her children were sent to Constantinople, where she adopted the name Zoe and was granted the title zostē patrikia (lady-in-waiting to the Empress) in 1019. Her family was integrated into the Byzantine court and inter-married with some of the most prominent Byzantine noble families.

In 1029 Maria together with her son Presian entered a conspiracy against emperor Romanos III Argyros. The plot was discovered, Presian was blinded and Maria was exiled to a monastery in the Thracesian Theme.

== Origins ==
No primary source mentions the ancestry of Maria, but Christian Settipani has noted the possibility that she may be the daughter of Tsar Boris II of Bulgaria and a Byzantine noblewoman. Boris II was the eldest surviving son of Tsar Peter I of Bulgaria and Maria (renamed Eirene) Lekapena, a granddaughter of Emperor Romanos I Lekapenos of Byzantium. Boris resided in Constantinople twice, initially as a hostage and then as a royal captive of Emperor John I Tzimiskes, when the emperor divested Boris II of his royal title and compensated him with the rank of a Byzantine magistros. During his sojourn in Constantinople Boris II had a relationship with an unknown woman by whom he left several children. Settipani believes that one of these children may have been Maria since:

- A union between the Krum and Kometopoulos dynasties is suggested by the later claim of Tsar Kaloyan of Bulgaria that Tsars Peter I (father of Boris II) and Samuel of Bulgaria, were his ancestors; a claim which was investigated and confirmed by Pope Innocent III.
- One of the sons of Ivan Vladislav and Maria was named Presian / Prousianos (briefly Tsar of Bulgaria in 1018), which was also the name of the great-grandfather of Tsar Peter I, suggesting that the blood of the Krum dynasty had been transmitted to the children of the couple.
- A Bulgarian priest, Paisij de Chilendar, identifies Maria as "a Greek woman, daughter of a magistros", the title of Boris II in Constantinople, although Settipani notes that the reliability of this late source is unclear.
- Maria led the negotiations to submit to Byzantine sovereignty following the death of her husband whilst he was besieging Dyrrhachium, suggesting that she possessed the requisite status and prestige, both for the Bulgarians and the Byzantines, to do so. Her hypothetical descent from Emperor Romanos I of Byzantium via her grandmother, Maria Lekapena, wife of Tsar Peter I, would explain her authority in the eyes of her former enemies as well as the lenient terms of the Bulgarian surrender.
- The honourable treatment which she and her family subsequently received in Constantinople, the allocation of prestigious titles to both her and her children, and the eminent marriages her descendants concluded within the Byzantine high nobility despite the enmity between her husband and Byzantium, all suggest that she was of very high descent and held in high regard by the Byzantines.

Settipani notes that the various indications given above support the hypothesis, in the absence of any primary sources that could offer greater certainty, that she may have been a daughter of Tsar Boris II and therefore also a granddaughter of Maria Lekapena of Byzantium.

== Family ==
Maria and Ivan Vladislav had several children, including:

1. Presian, later Byzantine magistros
2. Alusian, who was briefly emperor of Bulgaria in 1041
3. Aaron, Byzantine general
4. Trayan / Troianus, father of Maria of Bulgaria, who married Andronikos Doukas.
5. Catherine (Ekaterina), who married the future Byzantine Emperor Isaac I Komnenos

=== Descendant tree ===
Family
Maria	Ivan Vladislav (1015–1018)
Alusian magistros	Aaron prōtoproedros	Radomir	Catherine wife of Isaac I Komnenos
Presian magistros	Trayan	unknown son	5 daughters
[Anna] wife of Romanos IV Diogenes	Basil stratēgos	Theodore stratēgos	Maria wife of Andronikos Doukas	Manuel Komnenos	Maria Komnene
Samuil vestētōr	Radomir proedros
Constantine married Theodora, sister of Alexios I	Aron Theodore	Irene Doukaina wife of Alexios I	Theodora Doukaina	John Doukas governor of Bulgaria (1090–1092)
Maria (Anna) Doukaina wife of George Palaiologos	Michael Doukas prōtostratōr

== Sources ==
- Златарски, Васил, История на българската държава през средните векове, Том I. История на Първото българско царство. Част II. От славянизацията на държавата до падането на Първото царство (852—1018). 4.Приемниците на цар Самуил и покорението на България от Василий II Българоубиец.
- Cheynet, Jean-Claude, Pouvoir et Contestations a Byzance (963-1210), Paris: Publications de la Sorbonne, 1996.
- Norwich, John Julius, Byzantium: The Apogee, Alfred A. Knopf, 1992, ISBN 0-394-53779-3
- Runciman, Steven, The First Bulgarian Empire. 1930.
- Skylitzes, Synopsis Historiarum.
- Settipani, Christian, Continuité des élites à Byzance durant les siècles obscurs. Les princes caucasiens et l'Empire du VIe au IXe siècle, Paris: De Boccard, 2006.

Preceded by Irene of Larissa	Empress consort of Bulgaria; 1015–1018	Vacant Byzantine conquest of Bulgaria Title next held by Elena-Evgenia
