= Nikephoros Bryennios =

Nikephoros Bryennios or Nicephorus Bryennius (Greek: Νικηφόρος Βρυέννιος) may refer to:

- Nikephoros Bryennios (ethnarch) (fl. 1050s), Byzantine general
- Nikephoros Bryennios the Elder (fl. 1070s), Byzantine general, son of the above, who made an attempt on the throne of Michael VII Doukas in 1077-1078
- Nikephoros Bryennios the Younger (1062–1137), son or grandson of the preceding, Byzantine general, statesman and historian
