= Manuel Erotikos Komnenos =

Byzantine general

- Μανουήλ Ἐρωτικός Κομνηνός
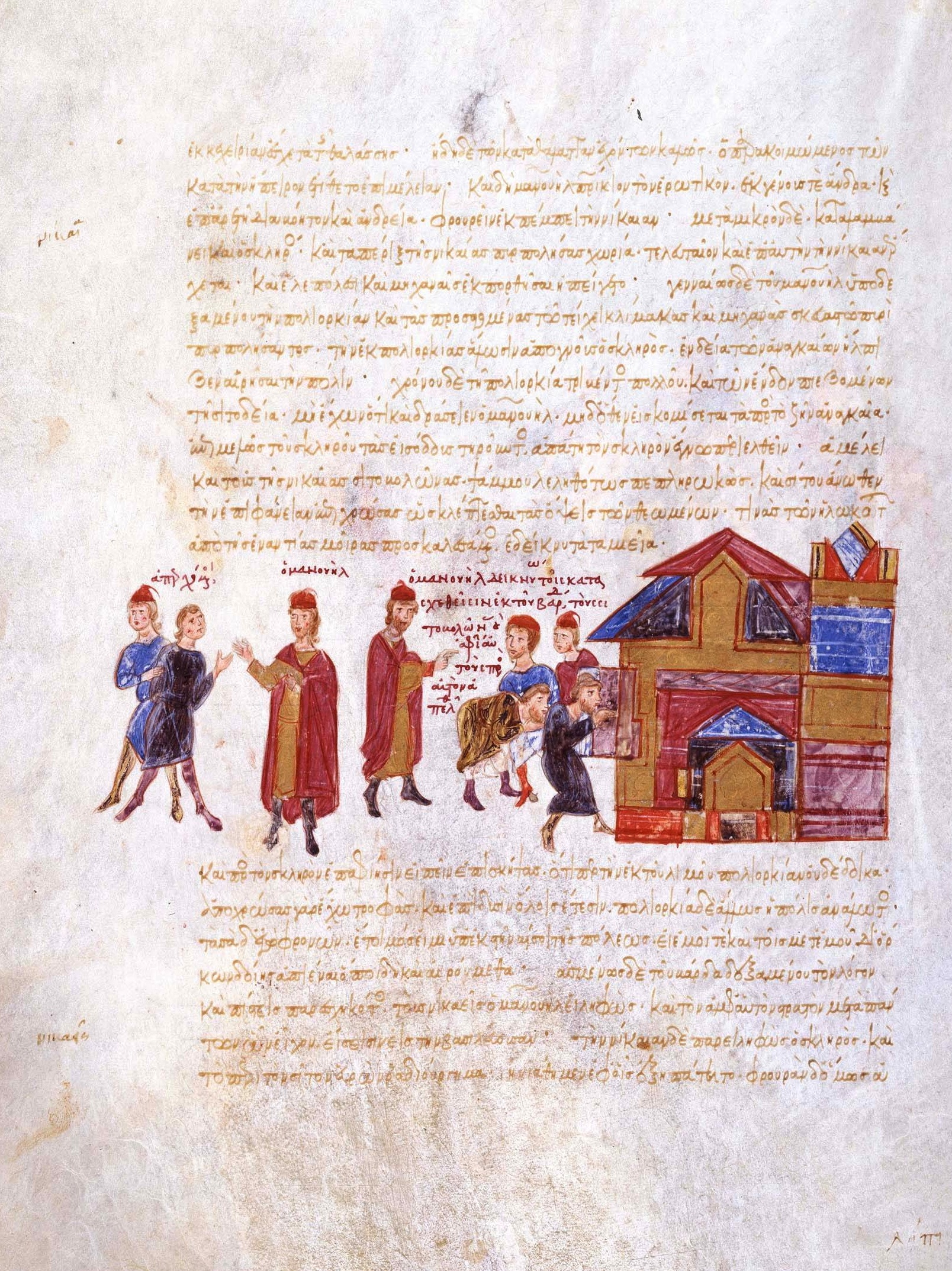
- Manuel displaying the full granaries of Nicaea to Skleros's envoys, miniature from the Madrid Skylitzes
- Born: 955/960
- Died: 1020
- Relatives: Isaac I Komnenos, John Komnenos (sons)
- Military career
- Conflicts: Rebellions of Bardas Skleros

Manuel Erotikos Komnenos (Greek: Μανουήλ Ἐρωτικός Κομνηνός, romanized: Manouēl Erōtikos Komnēnos; 955/960 – c. 1020) was a Byzantine military leader under Basil II, and the first fully documented ancestor of the Komnenos dynasty. His origin and parentage is obscure. He is only mentioned in the sources as leading the defence of Nicaea in 978 against the rebel Bardas Skleros, and as an imperial envoy to him 11 years later. He had three children, late in life. The eldest, Isaac, became emperor in 1057–1059, and the youngest, John, was the progenitor of the Komnenian dynasty as the father of Alexios I Komnenos.

== Biography ==
Nothing is known of Manuel's early life. From the fact that he was militarily active in 978, and given that he was able to have children as late as c. 1015, a date of birth of c. 955/960 has been suggested and generally accepted by modern scholars. His parents' identity is obscure: as Manuel's own firstborn son was named Isaac (Isaakios), the Greek scholar Konstantinos Varzos considered it likely that his father had the same name, since according to Greek custom the eldest male child is named after its paternal grandfather. Nothing is known otherwise about his life and career. According to Varzos, Manuel inherited his surname of "Komnenos" from his father, while his equally obscure mother was an unnamed lady of the Erotikos family, possibly related to the 11th-century rebel Theophilos Erotikos. The French scholar Jean-Claude Cheynet, on the other hand, proposed that Manuel was a member of the Erotikos family, and that he was the first to have changed the surname to Komnenos. Modern scholarship commonly accepts Michael Psellos's comment that the family originated from the village of Komne in southern Thrace. Varzos also considers Manuel a brother of the protospatharios Nikephoros Komnenos, who was named governor of the Armenian region of Vaspurakan soon after its annexation in 1021, but although possible, such a relationship cannot be proven.

Manuel is mentioned for the first time in 978, when he led the defence of Nicaea against the rebel general Bardas Skleros, who had risen up against Emperor Basil II (r. 976–1025). Although his great-granddaughter, the princess Anna Komnene, claims in her Alexiad that he had been named strategos autokrator (commander-in-chief) of the East and sent with full powers to deal with the revolt, it is far more likely that he was merely a local commander. Manuel maintained the city's defence with some success, even though the besiegers managed to undermine and collapse one of its towers, until the lack of food became acute. At that point Manuel was able to fool Skleros, by pretending that he had mountains of wheat and was considering joining him, into allowing him and the inhabitants to depart freely for Constantinople. Manuel re-appears in 989, when he was sent as an envoy to Skleros, who had once more risen in revolt against Basil II, to persuade him to surrender. Manuel was successful in his task, and the elderly rebel ended his revolt and gave himself up on 11 October. The titles by which he is recorded were patrikios, anthypatos, and vestes.

Manuel owned lands in Kastamon, on the Black Sea coast of north-central Anatolia, inherited after his death by his eldest son, and which became the stronghold of the family in the 11th century. Manuel Erotikos Komnenos died probably around 1020. At that time, his children were still young, so he entrusted them to the care of Emperor Basil II.

== Family ==
Manuel's wife is virtually unknown. She was likely named Maria, as were two of her granddaughters, and probably died c. 1015. They had two sons and one daughter:

1. Isaac I Komnenos (c. 1007 – 1061), married Catherine of Bulgaria, daughter of the last Bulgarian Tsar, and a distinguished general. He became emperor in 1057 at the head of a cabal of Anatolian generals, but resigned in 1059 and retired to a monastery.
2. an unnamed daughter (born c. 1012), married Michael Dokeianos, who served as Catepan of Italy and was killed by the Pechenegs in 1050.
3. John Komnenos (c. 1015 – 12 July 1067), married Anna Dalassene, and served during his brother's reign as Domestic of the Schools. He fathered several children who also became senior military leaders. His third son, Alexios I Komnenos, became emperor in 1081, founding the Komnenian dynasty.

== Sources ==
- Kazhdan, Alexander, ed. (1991). The Oxford Dictionary of Byzantium. Oxford and New York: Oxford University Press. ISBN 0-19-504652-8.
- Koytcheva, Elena (2014). "The Forefather of the Komnenian Dynasty. His Name and Career". In Schwarcz, Andreas; Soustal, Peter; Tcholakova, Antoaneta (eds.). Das mittelalterliche Bulgarien, Byzanz und Europa. Vienna: LIT Verlag. pp. 89–100. ISBN 978-3-643-50591-0.
- Lilie, Ralph-Johannes; Ludwig, Claudia; Pratsch, Thomas; Zielke, Beate (2013). Prosopographie der mittelbyzantinischen Zeit Online. Berlin-Brandenburgische Akademie der Wissenschaften. Nach Vorarbeiten F. Winkelmanns erstellt (in German). Berlin and Boston: De Gruyter.
- Varzos, Konstantinos (1984). Η Γενεαλογία των Κομνηνών [The Genealogy of the Komnenoi] (PDF) (in Greek). Vol. A1. Thessaloniki: Centre for Byzantine Studies, University of Thessaloniki.
