= Theodosios Monomachos =

- Usurper of the Byzantine Empire
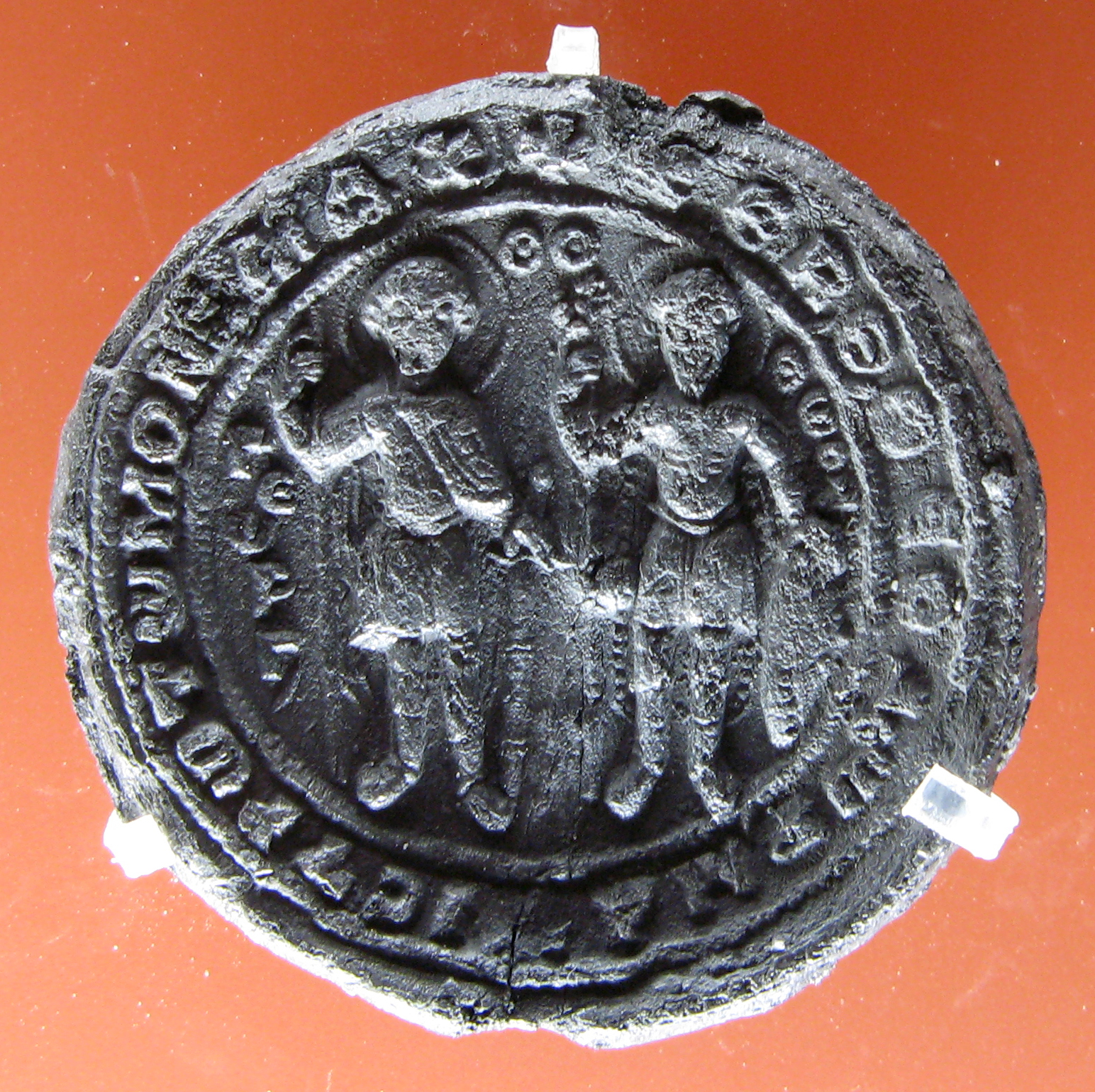
- Seal
- Reign: 1056
- Predecessor: Theodora
- Successor: Michael VI

Theodosios Monomachos, Latinized as Theodosius Monomachus (Greek: Θεοδόσιος Μονομάχος), was a senior Byzantine noble and the nephew of Emperor Constantine IX Monomachos. When Constantine's successor, the Empress Theodora, died in 1056, Monomachos tried to usurp the throne but failed miserably, was exiled and became a figure of mockery in the empire.

== Career ==
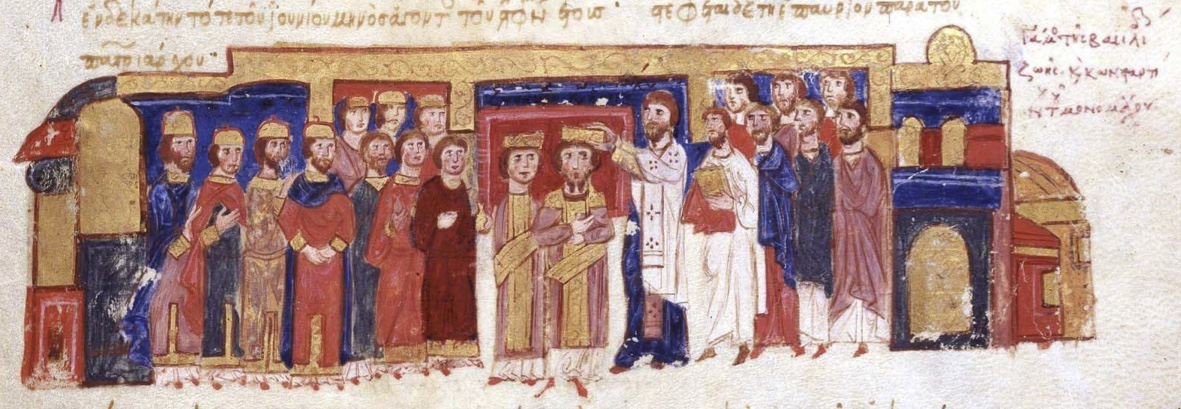
Constantine Monomachos, Theodosios's uncle, is crowned emperor.

Theodosios Monomachos was the grandson of another Theodosios Monomachos, an important bureaucrat under Basil II and Constantine VIII and the nephew of Emperor Constantine IX Monomachos, ruler of the Byzantine Empire. In 1056 he was serving as president of the Byzantine Senate, an important administrative role reserved for senior members of the aristocracy.

== Bid for the throne ==
=== Background ===
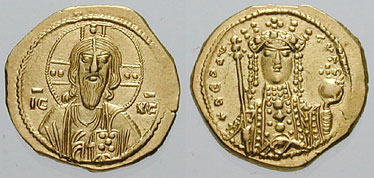
Gold tetarteron showing Christ on the left and Theodora as sole ruler on the right

Constantine IX died on 11 January 1055 without a legitimate heir. As he lay dying, he was persuaded by his councillors to ignore the rights of the elderly Empress Theodora and to pass the throne to the doux (Duke) of the Theme of Bulgaria, Nikephoros Proteuon. The plan was forestalled by Theodora, who vigorously asserted her right to rule. She came out of retirement, convened the Senate and was proclaimed "emperor" by the imperial guard, shortly before Constantine died. Theodora was in good health, active and disinclined to face her own mortality, despite being seventy-six years old. The patriarch Michael Keroularios advocated that she should advance a subject to the throne through marriage to her, something which would have assured the succession. Theodora refused to consider a token marriage or to name an heir to the throne. She became gravely ill with an intestinal disorder in late August 1056. On 31 August her advisors selected Michael Bringas, an aged civil servant and former military finance minister, to be emperor. According to Michael Psellus (1017/18–1078/96) his main attraction was that "he was less qualified to rule than he was to be ruled and directed by others". Theodora was unable to speak but her ministers decided that she had nodded at an appropriate moment; the Patriarch refused to believe it.

=== Failed putsch ===
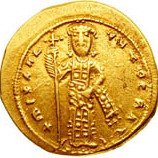
Gold tetarteron of Emperor Michael VI

When Theodosios Monomachos heard that Theodora was dying he assumed that he would be selected as the next emperor. Hearing of the stalemate he decided to force the issue. He armed his household slaves and stormed the prison, arming the inmates. With this core of support and assisted by his son he rallied a mob behind him and marched through the streets of Constantinople to the Palace. There his supporters in the imperial court hoped to present their colleagues with a fait accompli, similar to that of Theodora's the year before. When the Varangian Guard, the imperial bodyguards, heard of this they formed up outside the Palace to stop him. They were reinforced by a hastily mustered group of sailors from the nearby imperial docks. Monomachos lost heart and headed for Hagia Sophia, the main cathedral, to enlist the support of the Patriarch.

By the time he arrived, many of his followers had drifted away. Horrified at the near riot on the streets, the Patriarch had barred the cathedral doors against him. The Patriarch hurried to the Palace, where Bringas was crowned as Michael VI; Theodora died later the same day. Theodosios and his son were captured sitting on the outside steps of the church, abandoned by all. Surprisingly, this action was treated as street theatre rather than treason; Michael VI merely banished them to Pergamum. This increased the new emperor's popularity with the citizens of the city; they openly mocked Theodosios, composing insulting verses about his failed coup and calling out "The moron Monomachus did whatever he thought of". He was remembered on the streets of Constantinople as "Monomachus the moron".

== Sources ==
=== Primary Sources ===
- John Zonaras, Extracts of History
- John Skylitzes, Synopsis of Histories

=== Secondary Sources ===
- George Finlay, History of the Byzantine Empire from 716 – 1057, William Blackwood & Sons, 1853 Edinburgh; London OCLC 602496075
- Garland, Lynda (1999). Byzantine Empresses: Women and Power in Byzantium, AD 527–1204. London and New York: Routledge. ISBN 978-0-415-14688-3.
- Norwich, John Julius (1993), Byzantium: The Apogee, London: Penguin, ISBN 0-14-011448-3
- Treadgold, Warren T. (1997), A History of the Byzantine State and Society, Stanford, CA: Stanford University Press, ISBN 978-0-8047-2630-6
