= Catherine of Bulgaria =

Byzantine empress from 1057 to 1059

Catherine
- Augusta

Byzantine Empress consort
- Tenure: 1057–1059
- Spouse: Isaac I Komnenos
- Father: Ivan Vladislav of Bulgaria
- Mother: Maria

Catherine of Bulgaria (Church Slavonic: Єкатерїна, Greek: Αἰκατερίνη, romanized: Aikaterini, Bulgarian: Екатерина, romanized: Ekaterina; died after 1059) was empress consort to Byzantine emperor Isaac I Komnenos and co-regent of Constantine X for a period after the abdication of her spouse in 1059. She was a daughter of Ivan Vladislav of Bulgaria and his wife Maria, and thus a sister of Presian and Alusian. Catherine was also a paternal aunt of Maria of Bulgaria.

== Life ==
Catherine was a daughter of Ivan Vladislav (reigned 1015–18), the last Tsar of Bulgaria. She married the general Isaac Komnenos. After he became emperor in 1057, Isaac raised her to Augusta.

Isaac abdicated the throne on November 22, 1059. He retired to the Stoudios Monastery and spent the remainder of his life, until his death in late 1060 or 1061, as a monk. Following her husband's abdication, she appears to have co-reigned for a while with Constantine X, but eventually she too retired to the Myrelaion monastery under the monastic name of Xene.

== Family ==
Catherine had at least two children with Isaac:

- Manuel Komnenos (ca. 1030 – 1042/57), probably the "son of Komnenos" recorded as having been engaged to the daughter of the protospatharios Helios. He died sometime between 1042 and 1057.
- Maria Komnene (born ca. 1034), her beauty is remarked upon by Psellos, but she remained unmarried, and retired with her mother to the Myrelaion.

== Bibliography ==
- Kazhdan, Alexander, ed. (1991). The Oxford Dictionary of Byzantium. Oxford and New York: Oxford University Press. ISBN 0-19-504652-8.
- Sewter, Edgar Robert Ashton, ed. (1953). The Chronographia of Michael Psellus. New Haven, Connecticut: Yale University Press. Archived from the original on 2014-08-14.
- Varzos, Konstantinos (1984). Η Γενεαλογία των Κομνηνών [The Genealogy of the Komnenoi] (PDF) (in Greek). Vol. A. Thessaloniki: Centre for Byzantine Studies, University of Thessaloniki. OCLC 834784634. Archived from the original (PDF) on 2019-04-01.

Catherine of Bulgaria Comitopuli dynasty Born: 11th century Died: after 1059
Royal titles
Preceded by Zoe Porphyrogenita	Byzantine Empress consort 1057–1059	Succeeded by Eudokia Makrembolitissa
