= Leo Paraspondylos =

Leo Paraspondylos (Greek: Λέων Παρασπόνδυλος) was a high-ranking 11th-century Byzantine official, who served as chief minister to Empress Theodora and Emperor Michael VI.

== Biography ==
Leo's surname is in all probability a sobriquet; he seems to have belonged to the Spondylos family, and was possibly a relative of the general Michael Spondyles. He is attested as an official under Michael IV the Paphlagonian (r. 1034–41), and rose in office to become the Empire's chief minister (paradynasteuon) under Theodora (r. 1042–56) and Michael VI (r. 1056–57), holding the posts of synkellos and protosynkellos.

Leo's contemporary, historian and fellow public servant Michael Attaleiates, considered him an excellent administrator, but it was Paraspondylos' refusal to meet the demands of the Empire's leading generals in 1057 that led to their rebellion and the overthrow of Michael VI and the installation of one of their own number, Isaac I Komnenos (r. 1057–59), on the throne. After the rebel victory, Paraspondylos was dismissed from office and exiled from Constantinople, possibly being forcibly tonsured. Although occasionally critical of his rough manners, Michael Psellos intervened on his behalf with Isaac I Komnenos, to little avail. Nothing further is known of Leo thereafter.
