= Presian (son of Ivan Vladislav) =

Bulgarian prince, Byzantine general

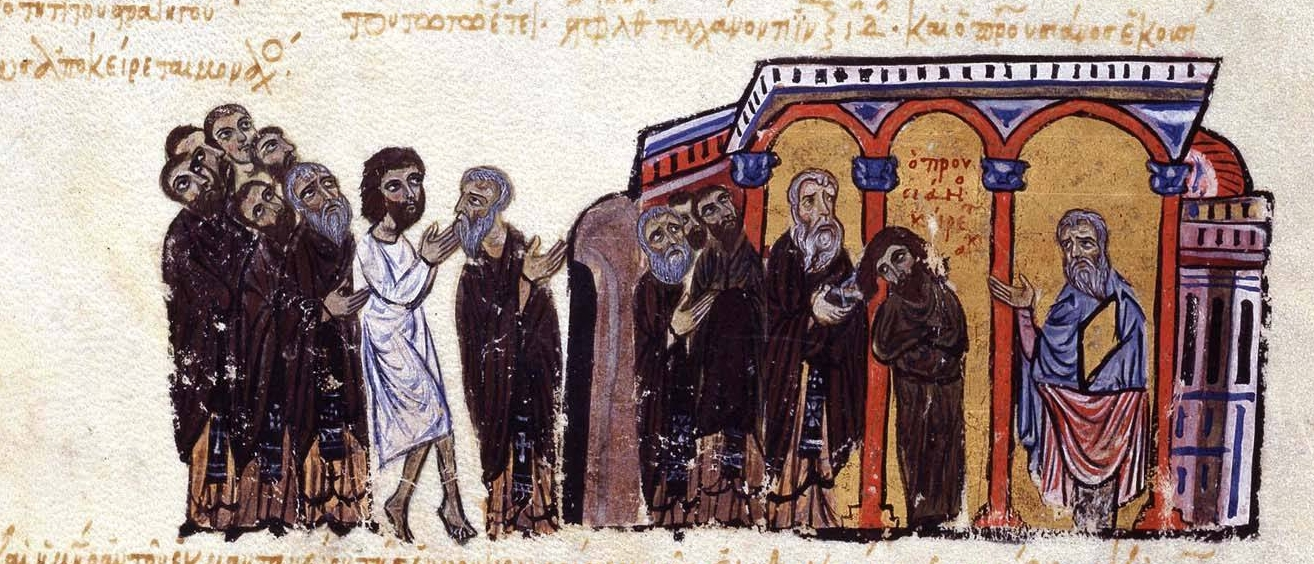
- Tonsure of Presian, from the Madrid Skylitzes manuscript, Fol. 203v
- Born: 996/97 (uncertain)
- Died: 1060/61 (uncertain)
- Burial place: Michalovce, Slovakia (uncertain)
- Occupation: military governor of the Bucellarian Theme
- Parents: Ivan Vladislav of Bulgaria (father); Maria (mother)
- Relatives: Alusian, Aaron, Catherine (siblings)
- Family: Cometopuli dynasty

Presian, sometimes referred to as Presian II (Bulgarian: Пресиян II; Greek: Προυσιάνος, romanized: Prousianos) was probably the oldest son of the last tsar of the First Bulgarian Empire, Ivan Vladislav (r. 1015–1018), who after the Byzantine conquest of Bulgaria entered Byzantine service, until his involvement in a conspiracy to usurp the throne in c. 1029. He was blinded and tonsured, after which he disappears from the historical record. It is possible, however, that in later life he emigrated to Hungary, as a tombstone of a certain "Prince Presian" has been found, in what is now Slovakia, giving his date of death as 1060/61.

== Life ==
He was probably the oldest son of Ivan Vladislav and Maria. He had five younger brothers as well as six sisters. After the death of Ivan Vladislav in February 1018, Bulgarian resistance to the Byzantine emperor Basil II (r. 976–1025) collapsed, and Presian with two of brothers, Alusian and Aaron, fled to Mount Tmoros in Tomornitsa. The mountain was surrounded by Basil with guards, until the three brothers surrendered after receiving guarantees for their safety. Prusian received the high title of magistros (by which it is surmised that he was the eldest and his father's heir-apparent), (Note: Probably not coincidentally, the title of magistros had also been given to the Bulgarian tsar Boris II, when he had been deposed and his realm first annexed by the Emperor John I Tzimiskes in 971.) while Alusian and Aaron received the title of patrikios. Their mother, along with the rest of their siblings, had made terms and surrendered to Basil II at Ohrid.

At about the same time, he also married into the Byzantine aristocracy himself, wedding the sister of Romanos Kourkouas.

Under Constantine VIII (r. 1025–1028), Presian served as governor (strategos) of the Bucellarian Theme. During his tenure he quarrelled with Basil Skleros, to the extent that both men exchanged blows. Emperor Constantine then banished both men to the Princes' Islands: one of them to the island of Plate, the other to Oxeia. Skleros was accused of planning to flee, and was blinded as a result; according to John Skylitzes, Presian narrowly escaped the same fate himself, but was released instead.

Under Romanos III Argyros (r. 1028–1034), Presian was accused of plotting, along with Constantine VIII's daughter Theodora, to overthrow the Emperor. He was banished to the Monastery of Manuel, and after the charges against him were proved to be true, he was blinded, and his mother, who had received the high title of zoste patrikia, expelled from Constantinople. In 1030/31 he was tonsured as a monk.

== Possible grave ==
His subsequent fate is unknown, but the gravestone of a certain "Prince Presian" found in Michalovce, Slovakia (then part of the Kingdom of Hungary), may indicate that he could have emigrated to Hungary, where he died in 6569 AM (1060/61 CE). The gravestone gives his date of birth as 6505 AM (996/97 CE). The identification of "Prince Presian" with the son of Ivan Vladislav is disputed, however.

== See also ==
- Presian I of Bulgaria

== Sources ==
- Hupchick, Dennis P. (2017). The Bulgarian-Byzantine Wars for Early Medieval Balkan Hegemony: Silver-Lined Skulls and Blinded Armies. Springer. ISBN 978-3-3195-6206-3.
- Kazhdan, Alexander, ed. (1991). The Oxford Dictionary of Byzantium. Oxford and New York: Oxford University Press. ISBN 0-19-504652-8.
- Lilie, Ralph-Johannes; Ludwig, Claudia; Pratsch, Thomas; Zielke, Beate (2013). Prosopographie der mittelbyzantinischen Zeit Online. Berlin-Brandenburgische Akademie der Wissenschaften. Nach Vorarbeiten F. Winkelmanns erstellt (in German). Berlin and Boston: De Gruyter.
- Pavlov, Plamen (1993). Княз Пресиан II - последният владетел на Първото българско царство и претендент за византийската корона (996/7 - 1060/61). V. Tarnovo-St. Zagora. OCLC 174155115.
- Tăpkova-Zaimova, Vasilka (2018). Bulgarians by Birth: The Comitopuls, Emperor Samuel and their Successors According to Historical Sources and the Historiographic Tradition. Brill. ISBN 978-9-0043-5299-5.
