= Nikephoros Bryennios (ethnarch) =

- Born: Adrianople (modern-day Edirne, Turkey)
- Relatives: Nikephoros Bryennios the Elder (son); Nikephoros Bryennios the Younger (grandson or great-grandson)
- Military career
- Allegiance: Byzantine Empire
- Rank: Ethnarches

Nikephoros Bryennios (Greek: Νικηφόρος Βρυέννιος), Latinized as Nicephorus Bryennius, was an important Byzantine general who was involved in rebellions against the empress Theodora and later the emperor Michael VI Stratiotikos.

== Career ==
Nikephoros Bryennios hailed from Adrianople and by the middle of the 11th century had risen to become the ethnarch responsible for commanding foreign mercenaries in the Macedonian Theme. He first appears in 1050, when he inflicted a heavy defeat on the Pechenegs, who had been raiding the Empire's Balkan provinces for years. This victory put an end to these raids for some time. In early 1055, as Emperor Constantine IX Monomachos (r. 1042–1055) lay dying, he was persuaded by his councillors, chiefly the logothetes tou dromou John, to pass the throne to the doux of Bulgaria, Nikephoros Proteuon. However, their plans were preempted by Constantine's aged sister-in-law Theodora, the last descendant of the Macedonian dynasty, who was brought out of her retirement in a convent and proclaimed "emperor" by the imperial guard shortly before Constantine's death. A purge of senior officials and the leadership of the European military units followed. Bryennios, whom the western tagmata apparently wanted to proclaim him emperor instead, was also dismissed and exiled.

Returning to the court after Theodora's death, he became embroiled in the military aristocratic unrest surrounding the reign of Michael VI. Although Michael VI restored his rank, he refused to hand over the confiscated estates and fortune. Ordered in 1057 to take 3,000 men to reinforce the army at Cappadocia, Nikephoros left the capital in a fit of rage and began plotting to overthrow Michael VI. On his arrival, he attacked and beat a representative of the emperor who countermanded Nikephoros's orders before throwing him in prison, which his officers took as a sign that Nikephoros was about to rebel. Releasing the imprisoned officer, they captured Nikephoros, blinded him and sent him to Constantinople. His capture precipitated the revolt that brought Isaac I Komnenos to the throne.

== Family ==
Nikephoros Bryennios had one wife, named Anna, who had the rank of kouropalatissa. They had two sons:

- Nikephoros Bryennios the Elder, a general who rose in revolt against Michael VII Doukas in 1077 and continued his rebellion against Nikephoros III. He was defeated by Alexios Komnenos at the Battle of Kalavrye and blinded. He was the father or grandfather of the historian and Caesar Nikephoros Bryennios the Younger.
- John, who supported his brother's grab for the throne, being named by him as his domestikos ton scholon. In the aftermath of the revolt's failure, John was captured by the Varangian Guard and subsequently murdered.

== Sources ==
- Finlay, George (1853). History of the Byzantine Empire from 716–1057. William Blackwood & Sons.
- Garland, Linda (1999), Byzantine Empresses: Women and Power in Byzantium AD 527–1204, Routledge, ISBN 978-0-415-14688-3
- Kazhdan, Alexander, ed. (1991). The Oxford Dictionary of Byzantium. Oxford and New York: Oxford University Press. ISBN 0-19-504652-8.
- Treadgold, Warren (1997). A History of the Byzantine State and Society. Stanford, California: Stanford University Press. ISBN 0-8047-2630-2.
