= Isaac I Komnenos =

Byzantine emperor from 1057 to 1059

- Emperor and Autocrat of the Romans
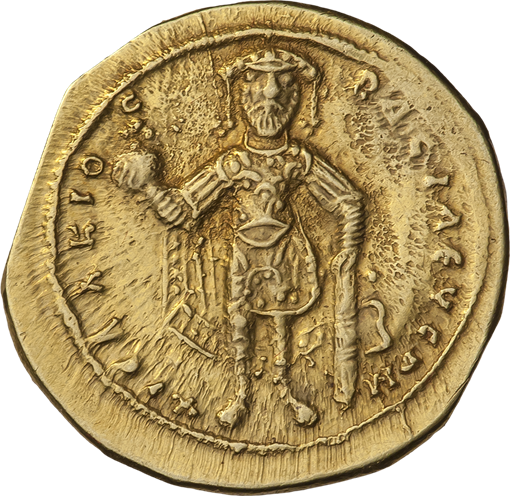
- Gold tetarteron of Isaac I Komnenos, showing the Emperor wielding a globus cruciger and holding a sheathed sword

Byzantine emperor
- Reign: 8 June 1057 – 22 November 1059
- Coronation: 1 September 1057
- Predecessor: Michael VI
- Successor: Constantine X
- Born: c. 1007
- Died: 1 June 1060 (aged 53); Monastery of Stoudios, Constantinople (now Istanbul, Turkey)
- Spouse: Catherine of Bulgaria
- Issue: Manuel Komnenos; Maria Komnene
- Dynasty: Komnenian
- Father: Manuel Erotikos Komnenos
- Mother: Maria?

Isaac I Komnenos or Comnenus (Ancient Greek: Ἰσαάκιος Κομνηνός, romanized: Isaákios Komnēnós; c. 1007 – 1 June 1060) was Byzantine emperor from 1057 to 1059, the first reigning member of the Komnenian dynasty.

The son of the general Manuel Erotikos Komnenos, he was orphaned at an early age, and was raised under the care of Emperor Basil II. He made his name as a successful military commander, serving as commander-in-chief of the eastern armies between c. 1042 and 1054. In 1057 he became the head of a conspiracy of the dissatisfied eastern generals against the newly crowned Michael VI Bringas. Proclaimed emperor by his followers on 8 June 1057, he rallied sufficient military forces to defeat the loyalist army at the Battle of Hades. While Isaac was willing to accept a compromise solution by being appointed Michael's heir, a powerful faction in Constantinople, led by the ambitious Patriarch of Constantinople, Michael Keroularios, pressured Michael to abdicate. After Michael abdicated on 30 August 1057, Isaac was crowned emperor in the Hagia Sophia on 1 September.

As emperor, he rewarded his supporters, but also embarked on a series of fiscal measures designed to shore up revenue and eliminate the excesses allowed to flourish under his predecessors. His aim was to fill the treasury and restore the Byzantine army's effectiveness to preserve the empire. The reduction of salaries, harsh tax measures and confiscation of Church properties aroused much opposition, particularly from Patriarch Keroularios, who had come to think of himself as a king-maker. In November 1058, Keroularios was arrested and exiled, and died before a synod to depose him could be convened.

The eastern frontier held firm during Isaac's reign, Hungarian raids were resolved by a treaty in 1059, while the restive Pechenegs were subdued by Isaac in person in summer 1059. Shortly after, Isaac fell ill, and on the advice and pressure of Michael Psellos, he abdicated his throne in favour of Constantine X Doukas, retiring to the Stoudion monastery where he died later in 1060.

== Biography ==
=== Origin and early career ===
The Byzantine Empire in the first half of the 11th century.

Isaac was the son of Manuel Erotikos Komnenos, who reportedly served as strategos autokrator of the East under Emperor Basil II and defended Nicaea against the rebel Bardas Skleros in 978. His mother's name was Maria, about whom nothing else is known. Manuel's native language was Greek and modern scholarship considers the family to have been of Greek origin. It is said that the family name was derived from the city of Komne, near Adrianople in Thrace (theme). Isaac was born c. 1007.

As Maria had died early, on his deathbed in 1020, Isaac's father commended his two surviving sons Isaac and John to the care of Emperor Basil II. According to Nikephoros Bryennios the Younger, the two children were raised with the utmost solicitude and the best tutors at the Stoudion monastery, with care taken to teach them military exercises and hunting. As soon as they came of age, Isaac and his brother joined the imperial bodyguard, the Hetaireia.

At a young age, perhaps as early as 1025, Isaac married Catherine of Bulgaria (born c. 1010), a daughter of Ivan Vladislav (r. 1015–1018), the last Tsar of the First Bulgarian Empire. From c. 1042 he held the post of stratopedarches of the East—likely denoting that he was domestikos ton scholon, commander-in-chief, of the eastern field army, but this title is not explicitly attested—and the ranks of magistros and vestes. He was dismissed by Empress Theodora in 1054, and replaced by her eunuch confidant, the proedros Theodore.

=== Revolt of the eastern generals ===
==== Michael VI and the military leadership ====
When Michael VI Bringas came to the throne in 1056, Isaac was chosen to lead a deputation of eastern generals to the new emperor. Michael VI engaged in mass promotions of individuals—in the eyes of the contemporary courtier Michael Psellos, to an excessive degree—and the military sought to partake in the emperor's bounty. This was not a trivial matter: the debasement of the Byzantine currency under Constantine IX Monomachos (r. 1042–1054) had affected military pay—not coincidentally presided over by none other than Michael Bringas, who was then military logothete—and while civil officials were compensated by being raised to higher dignities (which commanded higher salaries, rogai), the army was not. This exacerbated the already simmering dislike of the military aristocracy for the "regime of eunuchs and civilian politicians" that had dominated the empire during the last decades of the Macedonian dynasty.

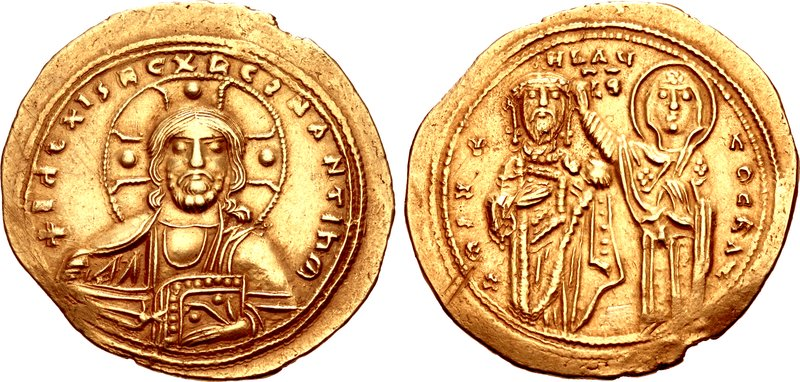
Gold tetarteron of Michael VI.

At Easter 1057, the traditional time when the emperor paid title holders their stipends, the delegation presented itself before the emperor. Along with Isaac, the delegation included the magistros Katakalon Kekaumenos, who had just been dismissed as doux of Antioch; the vestarches Michael Bourtzes, whose namesake grandfather had captured Antioch for Byzantium a century earlier; Constantine Doukas, married to a niece of the Patriarch of Constantinople Michael Keroularios; his brother John Doukas, a friend of Psellos; and others not explicitly named. As the historian Anthony Kaldellis comments, this was a formidable assemblage, as the families represented in it, all of them descended from military men promoted by the warrior-emperor Basil II, would define "the future of the empire for the next thirty years, indeed for the next century and more".

Psellos himself was an eyewitness at the reception of the generals' delegation, and claims that the emperor began abusing them at once; he then made Isaac, as the leader of the deputation, and his second, Kekaumenos, stand forth, and proceeded to denounce him, claiming that he was responsible for "all but losing Antioch" and "corrupting his army", being a coward and incompetent, and of having misappropriated army funds for his own use. John Skylitzes, who wrote later in the century, reports that the emperor treated the generals courteously, but agrees that he refused outright to consider the honours they claimed for themselves, notably the promotion of Isaac and Kekaumenos to the rank of proedros.

The effect of the emperor's attitude on the army leadership was profound, and turned them against Michael. A second delegation to the chief minister, the protosynkellos Leo Paraspondylos, was received in similar manner, and according to Psellos Isaac could barely restrain his colleagues from attacking the emperor then and there, in his own throne room. At length, a plot was formed against the emperor, and despite Isaac's own reluctance, according to Psellos, he was nominated as its leader.

The conspirators contacted the veteran general Nikephoros Bryennios, who had unsuccessfully tried to usurp the throne from Theodora but had recently been recalled by Michael VI as commander of the Macedonian army, and he apparently agreed to support them. Soon after, however, Bryennios left with his troops for Asia Minor, to campaign against the Turks. Once in the Anatolic Theme he quarreled with the army treasurer, threw him in prison, and appropriated the funds to pay his soldiers as he saw fit. This was seen by another local commander as a sign of rebellion; Bryennios was arrested and blinded.

==== Proclamation of Isaac as emperor and the Battle of Hades ====
Fearing that their plot was about to be discovered, the eastern generals hastened to act: the conspirators resident in the Anatolic Theme, Romanos Skleros, Michael Bourtzes, Nikephoros Botaneiates and the sons of Basil Argyros, hastened to find Isaac Komnenos at his estates near Kastamon in Paphlagonia, and on 8 June 1057, at a place called Gounaria, proclaimed him emperor. It is unclear whether any of the rebels held command of troops; rather, according to Kaldellis, "they had to canvass for support among the officers and soldiers and forge orders of imperial appointment for themselves". Thus Skylitzes reports that Kekaumenos had to forge imperial letters to mobilize the regiments of the Armeniac Theme. With this force he went to join Komnenos. Leaving his family for safety with his brother at the fortress of Pemolissa on the banks of the Halys River, Komnenos advanced west towards Constantinople.

At the same time, the western regiments, and some of the eastern ones too, remained loyal to Michael VI. The emperor placed them under the command of Theodora's eunuch favourite, the proedros Theodore, and Aaron, Isaac's brother-in-law; unlike previously, he now showered his commanders with honours to secure their allegiance. The loyalist army assembled at Nicomedia, controlling the direct route to the capital. Therefore Komnenos turned south and seized Nicaea as his base of operations.

The two armies met at the Battle of Hades, near Nicaea. In a hard-fought battle with many casualties, the loyalist left defeated the right wing of the rebel army. On the other flank, Kekaumenos broke through the loyalists to capture their camp and decide the battle, while Isaac held the centre.

==== Negotiations and downfall of Michael VI ====
Michael VI then attempted to negotiate with the rebels, sending Psellos, Leo Alopos, and the former mesazon of Constantine IX, Constantine Leichoudes, to Isaac's camp. Michael offered to adopt Isaac as his son and to grant him the title of Caesar, making him effectively his successor, but this was rejected in a public audience. Psellos claims that Isaac was inclined to accept, but the pressure of the assembled troops, who vocally refused it, forced him to agree with his supporters. At a private meeting afterwards Isaac insisted that he had accepted the title of emperor only under the pressure of his followers, and secretly accepted the offer provided that Michael would also share "some, at any rate, of his imperial power", so that he could make appointments and reward his followers, especially in the military.

The envoys returned to Constantinople, and rapidly secured Michael's consent to the proposal; the Emperor explicitly agreed to pardon Isaac's followers, and to accord Isaac additional honours above those of Caesar, setting him up almost as a co-emperor (symbasileus). As a sign of good faith, furthermore, Paraspondylos was dismissed from office. When the envoys returned to Isaac with this news, he publicly accepted the proposal and prepared to enter the capital.

Back in Constantinople, however, a crowd of officials assembled in the Hagia Sophia and began protesting that by making a deal, the Emperor was forcing them to renounce their oaths to oppose the rebels. Going a step further, they began themselves acclaiming Isaac as emperor. After a short while, on 30 August, Michael Keroularios and the clergy joined their cause, raising suspicions that this "spontaneous" assembly had been planned by the ambitious and wily Patriarch all along. Pressured by Keroularios and wanting to avoid bloodshed in the city, Michael agreed to abdicate. He was quickly tonsured and retired to a monastery. On the next day, 31 August, Isaac and his entourage crossed the Bosporus into Constantinople and entered the palace; on 1 September, he was crowned emperor by the Patriarch in the Hagia Sophia.

=== Reign ===
The first act of the new emperor was to reward his partisans: his fellow conspirators were named to high offices—his own brother John was named domestikos ton scholon of the West and received the high title of kouropalates, which was also awarded to Kekaumenos and Bryennios. The troops that had followed him received a donative and were quickly sent back east, to avoid any trouble with the populace of Constantinople. Patriarch Michael Keroularios was also rewarded for his support, by receiving sole authority for all personnel and financial matters of the Church, which were previously under the purview of the emperor, while the Patriarch's nephews received high court titles.

==== Fiscal reforms ====
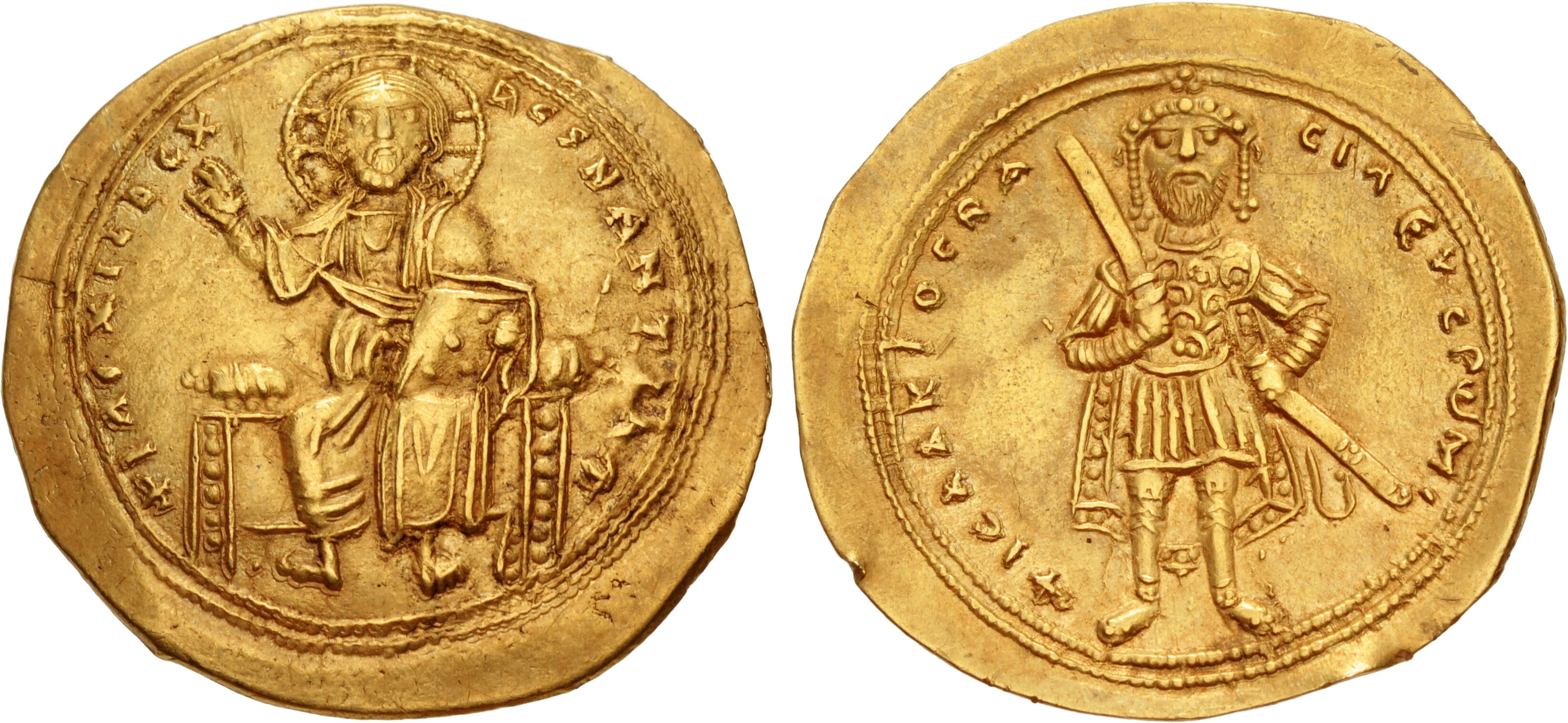
Gold histamenon struck by Isaac. His martial posture, bearing a naked sword, is unique among Byzantine coinage. (Note: Constantine IX Monomachos was the first emperor to introduce the sword as an element, being depicted holding a spear and a sheathed sword in his silver miliaresia. Isaac's depiction with a drawn sword on the prestigious gold coinage was novel and, following the outcry it raised, abandoned by subsequent rulers. The iconography of Isaac's coinage may have drawn inspiration from similar portrayals of caliphs in gold dinars.)

Isaac's rise to power was a turning point in Byzantine history, marking the definitive end of the long-lived Macedonian dynasty. Although powerful generals had previously suborned power, they had ruled alongside the Macedonian emperors; Isaac was the first military strongman to usurp power outright since the 9th century. This was reflected in the coinage struck in his name, which uniquely showed him holding a drawn sword; while it may have simply indicated his intention to restore "capable military rule" (Kaldellis), it came to be understood as a claim to rule by right of conquest. Certainly it highlighted Isaac's determination to make reforms and restore the effectiveness of the army.

The task he faced was truly herculean, as the politically weak emperors of the previous thirty years had fostered corruption and inefficiency, handing out titles and their attendant state salaries (rogai) in exchange for support. The devaluation of the coinage under Constantine IX had been a first reaction to the brewing crisis, but Isaac was the first emperor in this period who certainly faced a budget deficit. To fund his cherished army, Isaac was therefore obliged to begin strict economies: he reduced or abolished the rogai of those who had been awarded titles, enforced a stricter and more efficient collection of taxes, reclaimed misappropriated imperial estates, and cancelled grants of such lands and tax exemptions made under Constantine IX and Michael VI, particularly those that had been granted to monasteries and churches, using a law of Nikephoros II Phokas. Even though salaries of officials, especially members of the Senate, were cut, Isaac's efforts were enthusiastically received even among some senior members of the civil bureaucracy, judging by the comments of Psellos and Michael Attaleiates.

[Isaac Komnenos] was eager to lose no time in cutting out the dead wood which had long been accumulating in the Roman Empire. We can liken it to a monstrous body, a body with a multitude of heads, an ugly bull-neck, hands so many that they were beyond counting, and just as many feet; its entrails were festering and diseased, in some parts swollen, in others wasting away, here afflicted with dropsy, there diminishing with consumption. Now Isaac tried to remedy this by wholesale surgery.

— Michael Psellos, Chronographia, VII.51

==== Downfall of Keroularios ====
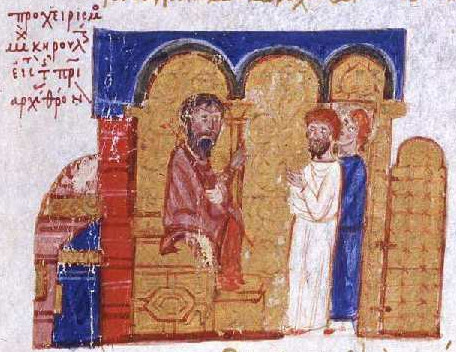
Patriarch Michael Keroularios on his throne, from the Madrid Skylitzes

The only point of criticism raised by Psellos is his haste and severity, judging that by a more gradual and judicious, step by step approach, he would have reaped greater success with far less opposition. Thus his appropriation of Church lands provoked the reaction of Michael Keroularios, with whom Isaac's relations had been steadily deteriorating. The Patriarch's role in Isaac's accession and his extensive new powers over the Church quickly went to his head. He is said to have admonished and berated the emperor, even going as far as threatening to destroy him "like an oven he had made". He is also alleged to have worn imperial purple boots, a privilege restricted to the emperor, and which may indicate, according to Kaldellis, that Keroularios was influenced by Papal theories and conceived of the secular and clerical powers as co-equal, a traditional Byzantine approach known as a symphonia.

Finally, on 8 November 1058, while Keroularios was visiting a church outside the city walls, and hence was away from his supporters in the urban mob, Isaac sent the Varangian Guard to arrest him and take him to Prokonnesos, where he was placed under house arrest. Isaac applied considerable pressure on Keroularios to resign, but the latter steadfastly refused. In the end, the emperor decided to convene a synod against the Patriarch. This too was to take place away from the capital, somewhere in Thrace, with Psellos, who had himself been earlier persecuted by Keroularios, as the chief accuser. In the event, Keroularios died on 21 January 1059, before the synod could take place. Isaac appointed the bureaucrat Constantine Leichoudes as the new patriarch.

==== Military situation ====
The rebellion and civil war that brought Isaac to the throne had concentrated Byzantium's military might away from its borders. The contemporary Armenian historian Aristakes Lastivertsi reports that the Georgian lord Ivane took advantage of this opportunity to capture two Byzantine frontier forts as well as an imperial tax collector, and lay siege to Theodosiopolis. The Byzantine doux at Ani drove him off, but Ivane then called upon some Turks for assistance. About a month after Isaac's coronation, these raiders reached Melitene, whose inhabitants were allowed to depart before the city was plundered by the Turks. Local Byzantine troops managed to blockade the mountain passes, forcing the raiders to winter in the region of Chorzane. In spring 1058, the Turks were ambushed and defeated while they attacked the fort of Mormrans, leaving most of their captives behind. At about the same time or shortly after, another Turkish raid into Taron was heavily defeated by the Byzantine defenders. Melitene was repaired and refortified, and made the seat of a doux.

Constantine IX had famously abolished the military obligations of the Armenian thematic troops in exchange for cash payments, a step widely regarded, both by contemporaries and modern historians, as having catastrophic consequences for Byzantium's eastern defences, especially against the mounting Turkish threat. The Turks had taken Vaspurakan during the regency following Constantine's death, exposing the Anatolian interior to their raids. While Isaac does not appear to have acted to restore the thematic armies, according to Kaldellis, the reaction of the local forces to these events does not appear to indicate a degradation of Byzantium's defensive abilities in the East, but rather the continued and successful application of old-established counter-raiding principles as codified in Nikephoros Phokas's De velitatione bellica a century earlier.

Isaac led only one military expedition, in late summer of 1059, into the Balkan provinces that had been suffering raids by the Hungarians and the Pechenegs. The details of the campaign are obscure, but the two had possibly entered into an alliance. At Serdica, the emperor made a treaty with the Hungarians—who appear to have kept the fortress town of Sirmium—before moving against the Pechenegs in the area of Moesia. Most of the Pechenegs submitted again to imperial authority. The only major combat was against the fortified stronghold of Selte, a recalcitrant Pecheneg chief, whom the Byzantines quickly defeated and captured.

On its return march the army was caught in a sudden storm on 24 September. Many men and supplies were lost, while Isaac barely escaped death when a tree struck by lightning fell next to him. This was followed by the false rumour that a tax assessor in the eastern provinces was plotting rebellion, and Isaac hastened back to the capital. Despite these events, Psellos claims that at this point Isaac's character changed markedly, and that he became "more haughty to such an extent that he held everyone else in contempt", including his own brother.

==== Illness, abdication, and death ====
Isaac was a passionate hunter with both the horse and the falcon, spending much time at a hunting lodge outside Constantinople. On a hunt he fell ill. As the fever lasted for several days, Isaac, fearing he would die soon, named Constantine Doukas as his successor on 22 November 1059, (Note: In earlier studies the date of Isaac's abdication was commonly accepted as 25 December 1059. In 1966, Paul Gautier revised the date to 22 November, with the proclamation and coronation of Constantine Doukas taking place on 23 November. Varzos, Vol. A1, 1984, p. 43 (note 12)) and agreed to resign and retire to a monastery. Psellos claims that he was the main author of this nomination, even against the initial opposition of Empress Catherine.

According to Psellos, Isaac began to recover soon after Doukas's nomination, and started reconsidering his decision. Psellos again took the decisive step of having Doukas publicly acclaimed as emperor on 23 November, with Psellos putting the purple sandals on his feet. Isaac then resigned himself to his fate, and was tonsured as a monk, retiring to the Stoudion monastery. Psellos's prominent role in these events may simply be exaggeration and self-promotion, especially as he was writing this part of his history during the reign of Constantine Doukas and his son Michael VII Doukas (r. 1071–1078). No contemporary or later source, not even during the Komnenian dynasty (1081–1180), described or implied a coup by Doukas and his supporters, and the legality of the transition was never questioned.

Empress Catherine remained at the palace, and was even allowed to be mentioned first in the imperial acclamations, with Doukas coming second. This joint reign lasted for a brief while, before she too retired to the Myrelaion monastery under the monastic name of Xene. Isaac lived the remainder of his life as a simple monk in Stoudion, readily performing menial tasks until he died in 1060, probably on 1 June.

== Family ==
Isaac was married to Catherine of Bulgaria, a daughter of Ivan Vladislav, the last ruler of the First Bulgarian Empire. Isaac raised her to the position of Augusta. The couple had at least two children:

- Manuel Komnenos (c. 1030 – c. 1042/57), probably the "son of Komnenos" recorded as having been engaged to the daughter of the protospatharios Helios. He died sometime between 1042 and 1057.
- Maria Komnene (born c. 1034), her beauty is remarked upon by Psellos but she remained unmarried and retired with her mother to the Myrelaion.

== Sources ==
- Cheynet, Jean-Claude (1996). Pouvoir et Contestations à Byzance (963–1210) (in French). Paris: Publications de la Sorbonne. ISBN 978-2-85944-168-5.
- Gautier, Paul, ed. (1975). Nicéphore Bryennios: Histoire. Corpus Fontium Historiae Byzantinae (in French). Brussels: Byzantion. OCLC 814361996.
- Grotowski, Piotr L. (2007). "Military Equipment as a Symbolic Form in Byzantium". Byzantinoslavica. 65: 91–116. ISSN 0007-7712.
- Guilland, Rodolphe (1967). "Le Domestique des Scholes". Recherches sur les institutions byzantines [Studies on the Byzantine Institutions]. Berliner byzantinische Arbeiten 35 (in French). Vol. I. Berlin and Amsterdam: Akademie-Verlag & Adolf M. Hakkert. pp. 426–468. OCLC 878894516.
- Guilland, Rodolphe (1967). "Le Stratopédarque et le Grand statopédarque". Recherches sur les institutions byzantines [Studies on the Byzantine Institutions]. Berliner byzantinische Arbeiten 35 (in French). Vol. I. Berlin and Amsterdam: Akademie-Verlag & Adolf M. Hakkert. pp. 498–521. OCLC 878894516.
- Kaldellis, Anthony; Krallis, Dimitris, eds. (2012). Michael Attaleiates: The History. Cambridge, MA and London: Harvard University Press. ISBN 978-0-674-05799-9.
- Kaldellis, Anthony (2017). Streams of Gold, Rivers of Blood: The Rise and Fall of Byzantium, 955 A.D. to the First Crusade. New York: Oxford University Press. ISBN 978-0190253226.
- Kazhdan, Alexander, ed. (1991). The Oxford Dictionary of Byzantium. Oxford and New York: Oxford University Press. ISBN 0-19-504652-8.
- Schreiner, Peter (1975). Die byzantinischen Kleinchroniken [Byzantine small chronicles]. Corpus Fontium Historiae Byzantinae (in Greek). Vol. 1. Vienna: ÖAW. ISBN 978-3-7001-0206-9.
- Sewter, Edgar Robert Ashton, ed. (1953). The Chronographia of Michael Psellus. New Haven, Connecticut: Yale University Press. OCLC 427306.
- Treadgold, Warren (1997). A History of the Byzantine State and Society. Stanford, California: Stanford University Press. ISBN 0-8047-2630-2.
- Varzos, Konstantinos (1984). Η Γενεαλογία των Κομνηνών [The Genealogy of the Komnenoi] (PDF) (in Greek). Vol. A1. Thessaloniki: Centre for Byzantine Studies, University of Thessaloniki.
- Wortley, John, ed. (2010). John Skylitzes: A Synopsis of Byzantine History, 811–1057. Cambridge: Cambridge University Press. ISBN 978-0-521-76705-7.

Isaac I Komnenos Komnenian dynasty Born: c. 1007 Died: 1060
Regnal titles
Preceded by Michael VI	Byzantine emperor 1057–1059	Succeeded by Constantine X Doukas
