= Maria of Bulgaria =

Byzantine noblewoman

Maria
- Died: after 1095
- Noble family: Doukas (by marriage); Cometopuli (by birth)
- Spouse: Andronikos Doukas
- Issue Detail: Michael Doukas; Constantine Doukas; John Doukas (megas doux); Irene Doukaina
- Father: Troian of Bulgaria
- Mother: ... Aballantissa, daughter of Romanos Aballantes

Maria of Bulgaria (died 21 November, after 1095), known as Maria Doukaina (Greek: Μαρία Δούκαινα) in the Byzantine sources, was the wife of protovestiarios and domestikos ton scholon Andronikos Doukas and mother of Empress Irene Doukaina.

== Life ==
Maria was a daughter of Troian of Bulgaria by an unnamed Byzantine Aballantissa noblewoman, daughter of Strategos Romanos Aballantes, descended from the families of Kontostephanos and Phokas, and thus a granddaughter of Ivan Vladislav and Maria, the last rulers of the First Bulgarian Empire.

Maria married Andronikos Doukas well before 1066. Her husband was a son of the Caesar John Doukas, a major power player in Byzantine politics of the era, and Eirene Pelagonitissa. He was also a nephew of Constantine X and first cousin of Michael VII.

Maria was endowed with an inheritance of vast land holdings around Lake Ohrid, and her considerable income was used to support her husband's lavish lifestyle and political ambitions. As the last descendants of the ruling family of Bulgaria, Maria and her daughters Irene and Anna, who married the first notable member of the Palaiologos family, carried not only immense wealth but also legitimisation of Byzantine authority over the Bulgarian population: her (and her daughters') prominent marriages are evidence for the eventual integration of the descendants of the Cometopuli dynasty into the court nobility in Constantinople. As mother of the Empress Irene Doukaina, Maria was a woman of some influence in the early years of the reign of Alexios I Komnenos, although she, as a widow, shunned the Imperial court and chose to live in her Lake Ohrid estate. Her granddaughter Anna Komnene praises her beauty and wisdom in the Alexiad.

In 1077–1081, she extensively rebuilt and restored the Chora Church, to more or less its present shape.

== Family ==
Maria of Bulgaria and Andronikos Doukas had seven children:

- Michael Doukas
- Constantine Doukas
- Stephen Doukas
- John Doukas
- Irene Doukaina, who married Emperor Alexios I Komnenos.
- Anna Doukaina, who married George Palaiologos
- Theodora Doukaina, a nun

== Sources ==
- Kouroupou, Matoula; Vannier, Jean-François (2005), "Commémoraisons des Comnènes dans le typikon liturgique du monastère du Christ Philanthrope (ms. Panaghia Kamariotissa 29)", Revue des études byzantines (in French) (63): 41–69, doi:10.3406/rebyz.2005.2305
- Polemis, Demetrios I. (1968). The Doukai: A Contribution to Byzantine Prosopography. London: Athlone Press.
