= Michael VI Bringas =

Byzantine emperor from 1056 to 1057

- Emperor and Autocrat of the Romans
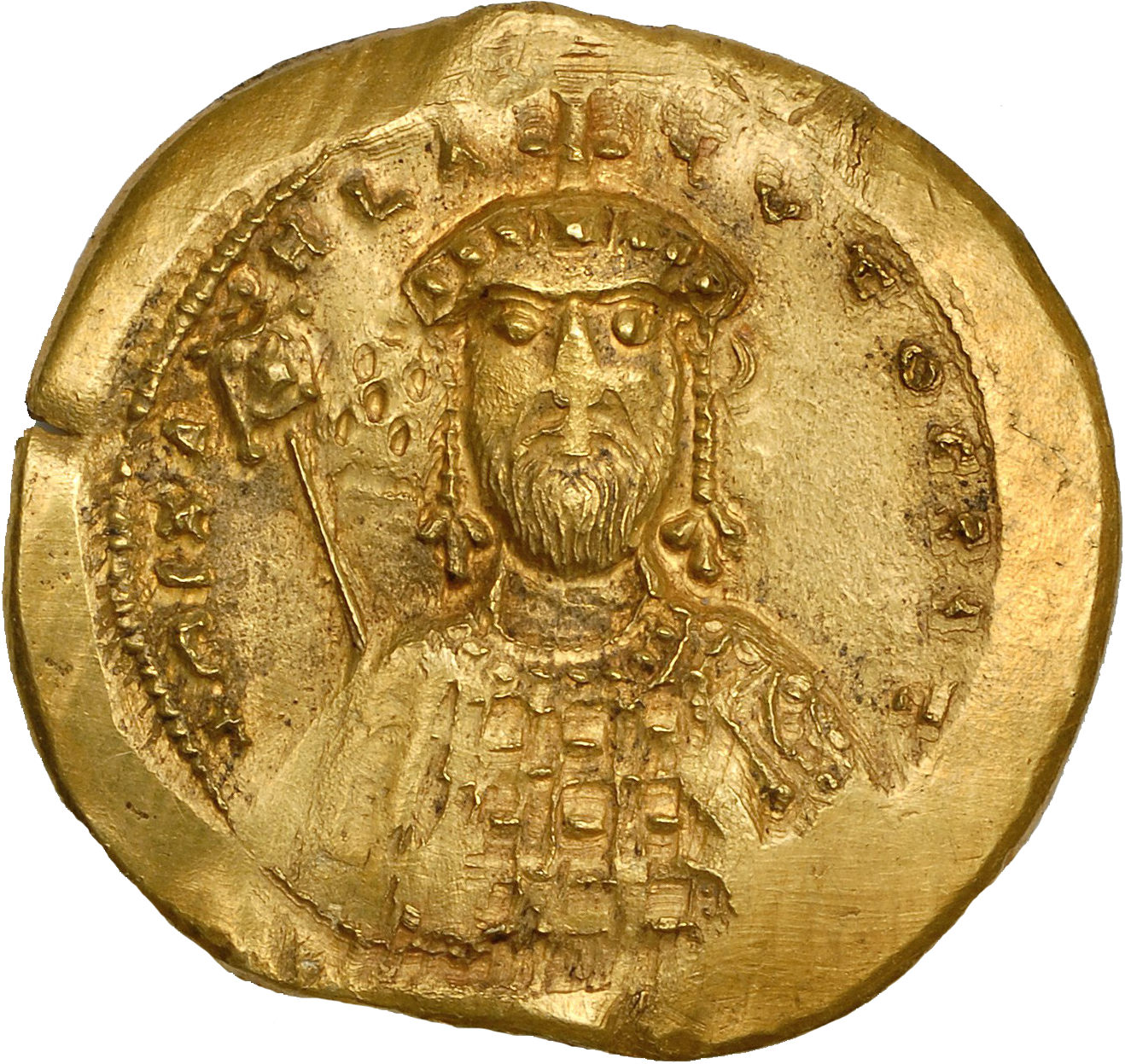
- Gold tetarteron of Michael's reign

Byzantine emperor
- Reign: 31 August 1056 – 30 August 1057
- Coronation: c. 22 August 1056 (Note: The chronology of events at the end of the Macedonian dynasty is somewhat uncertain. Following ancient Roman tradition, most writers preferred to record the duration of an emperor's reign rather than provide exact calendar dates. One chronicle records Michael's coronation as 22 August, but gives Theodora's death as 27 August (instead of the accepted 31 August). Sources agree that he was crowned co-emperor a few days before her death.)
- Predecessor: Theodora Porphyrogenita
- Successor: Isaac I Komnenos
- Died: after 1057

Michael VI Bringas (Greek: Μιχαήλ Βρίγγας, romanized: Mikhaḗl Brîngas; died c. 1057), also called Stratiotikos (Greek: Στρατιωτικός, "the military one, the warlike") and the Old (Greek: Γέρων, Geron), reigned as Byzantine emperor from 1056 to 1057.

== Career ==
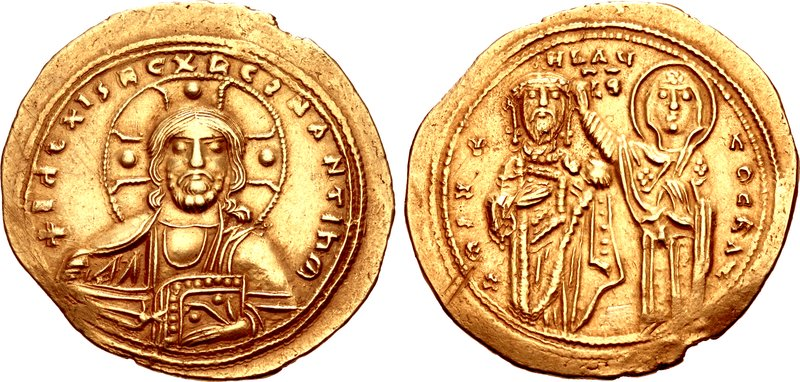
Histamenon of Michael VI Bringas.

Apparently a relative of the powerful courtier Joseph Bringas (influential during the reign of Romanos II), Michael Bringas was an elderly patrician (hence the nickname "Geron") and a member of the court bureaucracy when he ascended to the throne. He had formerly served as a military finance minister (logothetes tou stratiotikou, hence the epithet Stratiotikos). (Note: Despite his nickname stratiotikos lit. 'military man', Michael was not an active army officer until 1056, but instead a logothetes, responsible for the pay and provisioning of the imperial soldiers, see Theotokis & Mesko 2020, p. 59, note 43) Michael Bringas was chosen for his pliability by the advisors of empress Theodora as her successor shortly before her death on 31 August 1056. They had decided that the dying Macedonian empress had nodded her approval as she was unable to speak, however this is disputed as even the Patriarch Michael I Cerularius refused to believe such a thing had occurred. The appointment had been secured through the influence of Leo Paraspondylos, Theodora's most trusted adviser, who remained chief minister.

Although Michael managed to survive a conspiracy organized by Theodosios, a nephew of the former emperor Constantine IX Monomachos, he was faced with the disaffection of the military aristocracy. His most costly error was to ignore the perceived rights of the general Nikephoros Bryennios, who had been demoted and reduced to poverty after falling out with the Empress Theodora; Michael restored Bryennios's military rank, but not his confiscated wealth and estates. Michael compounded his error by rebuffing Bryennios after he had already ordered the restored general to lead a division of 3,000 men to reinforce the army in Cappadocia. From here Bryennios began plotting to overthrow Michael VI, and it was his capture that precipitated the military nobility to rally around the general Isaac Komnenos, who was proclaimed emperor in Paphlagonia on 8 June 1057.

Soon after, the government's army was routed at the Battle of Petroe (20 August 1057) near Nicaea, and Isaac Komnenos advanced on Constantinople. Michael VI attempted to negotiate with the rebels through the famous courtier Michael Psellos, offering to adopt Isaac as his son and to grant him the title of kaisar (caesar), but his proposals were publicly rejected. Privately Isaac showed himself more open to negotiation, and he was promised the status of co-emperor. However, during the course of these secret negotiations, a riot in favor of Isaac broke out in Constantinople. Patriarch Michael I convinced Michael VI to abdicate in Isaac's favor on 30 August 1057. The emperor duly followed the patriarch's advice and became a monk. He retired to his private home and died there shortly thereafter.

== Sources ==
=== Primary sources ===
- Michael Psellus, Chronographia.
- Thurn, Hans, ed. (1973). Ioannis Scylitzae Synopsis historiarum. Berlin; New York: De Gruyter. ISBN 978-3110022858.

=== Secondary sources ===
- Norwich, John Julius (1993), Byzantium: The Apogee, Penguin, ISBN 0140114483
- Kazhdan, Alexander, ed. (1991), Oxford Dictionary of Byzantium, Oxford University Press, ISBN 978-0195046526
- Theotokis, Georgios; Mesko, Marek (2020). War in Eleventh-Century Byzantium. Taylor & Francis. ISBN 9780429576881.
- Finlay, George (1853). History of the Byzantine Empire from 716–1057. Edinburgh: William Blackwood & Sons. OCLC 906577940.

== See also ==
- List of Byzantine emperors

== Notes ==
Regnal titles
Preceded by Theodora	Byzantine emperor 1056–1057	Succeeded by Isaac I
