= Theodore Aaronios =

Theodore Aaronios was one of the latter members of the Aaronios family in the 11th century Byzantine Empire.

Theodore served as governor of Taron. He was killed in battle with the Turks in 1055.
