= Alusian of Bulgaria =

Bulgarian and Byzantine noble

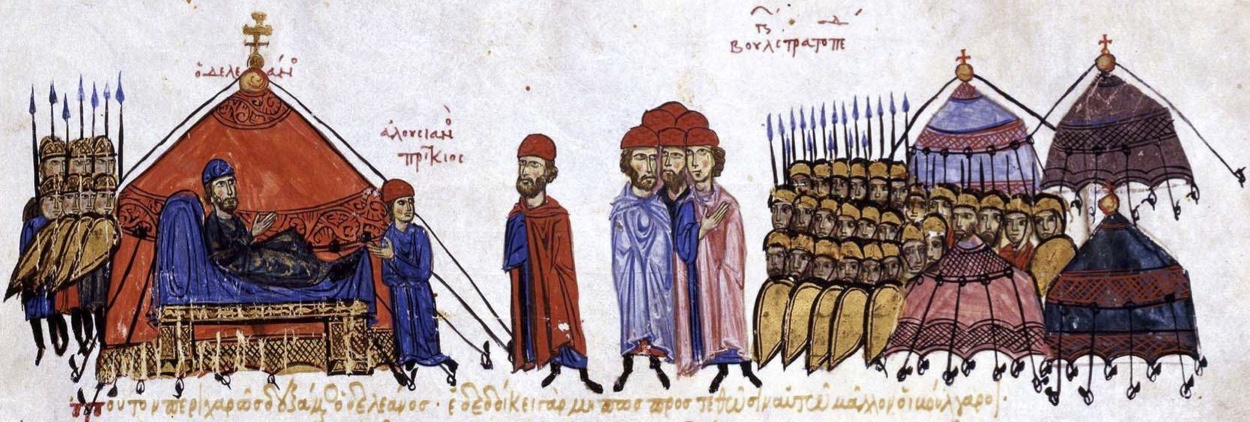
Alusian (centre) appears before Peter Delyan and the Bulgarian camp. Miniature from the Skylitzes Chronicle.

Alusian (Bulgarian: Алусиан, Greek: Ἀλουσιάνος) was a Bulgarian and Byzantine noble who ruled as emperor (tsar) of Bulgaria for a short time in 1041.

== Life ==
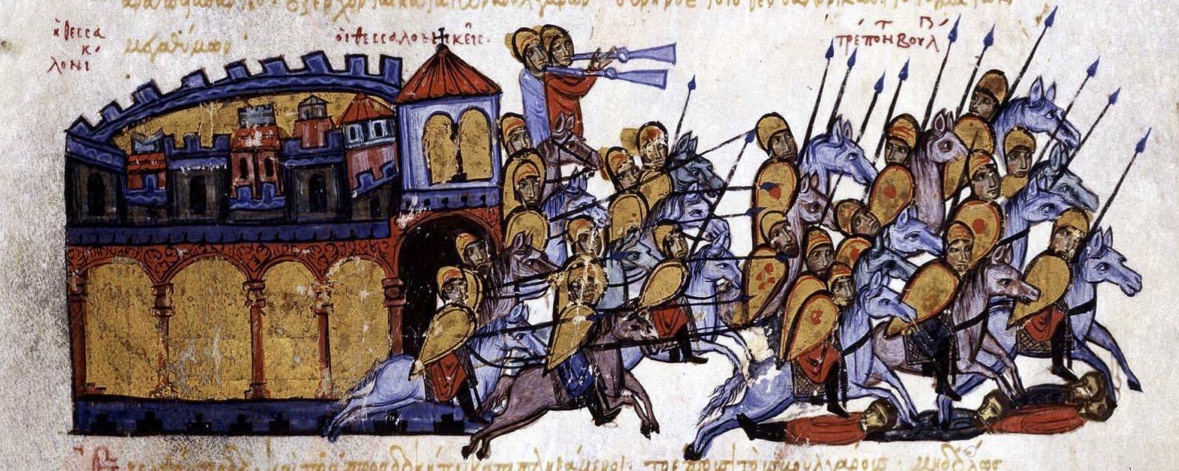
After its unsuccessful attack on Thessalonica, the Bulgarian army under Alusian flees. Miniature from the Skylitzes Chronicle.

Alusian was the second son of Emperor Ivan Vladislav of Bulgaria (r. 1015–1018) by his wife Maria. Together with his older brother Presian II, he attempted to resist Bulgaria's annexation by the Byzantine Empire in 1018 but eventually had to surrender to Emperor Basil II (r. 976–1025) in the same year in Tomornitsa.

In the Byzantine Empire Alusian joined the ranks of the court aristocracy and was appointed governor (stratēgos) of the theme of Theodosioupolis. Alusian increased his wealth by marrying a wealthy member of the Armenian nobility, but in the later 1030s, he lost the favor of Emperor Michael IV the Paphlagonian (r. 1034–1041) and his brother, the powerful parakoimomenos John the Orphanotrophos. Alusian was deprived of certain estates and fined a hefty amount for alleged misdeeds.

Hearing of the successful uprising of his second cousin Peter Delyan against the emperor in 1040, Alusian fled the Roman court and joined Peter's ranks. Alusian was welcomed by Peter, who gave him an army with which to attack Thessalonica. The siege however was raised by the Byzantines, and the Bulgarian army was defeated. Alusian barely escaped and returned to Ostrovo.

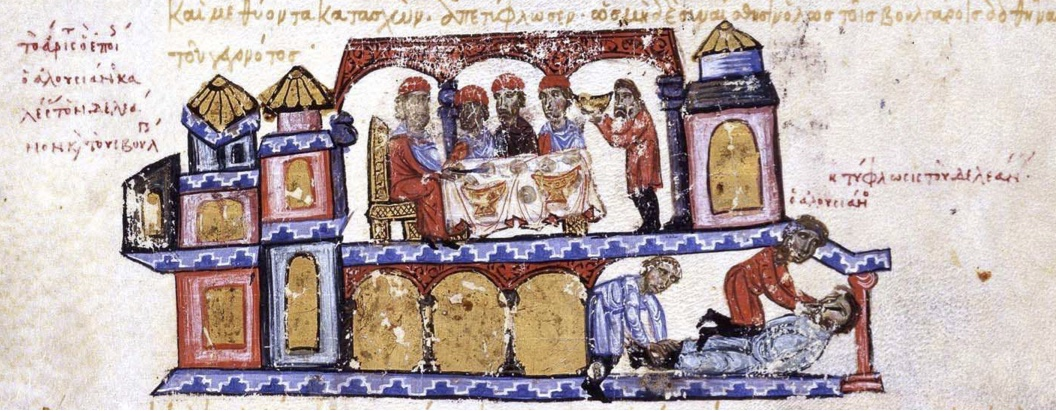
Alusian invites Peter Delyan to a banquet and has him blinded. Miniature from the Skylitzes Chronicle.

One night in 1041, during dinner, Alusian took advantage of Peter's inebriation, cut off his nose, and blinded him with a kitchen knife. Since Alusian was of the blood of Tsar Samuel (r. 997–1014), he was quickly proclaimed emperor in Peter's place by his troops but conspired to desert to the Byzantines. As the Bulgarian and Byzantine troops were preparing for battle, Alusian deserted to the enemy, surrendering the blinded Peter Delyan to the emperor. As a reward, his possessions and lands were restored to him. He was given the high court rank of magistros. The same title had been granted earlier to other deposed emperors of Bulgaria, namely Boris II in 971 and Presian II in 1018.

Alusian's subsequent fate is unknown, but his descendants, the Alousianoi, continued to prosper in the ranks of the Byzantine aristocracy until the 14th century.

== Family ==
By his marriage to an Armenian noblewoman from the theme of Kharsianon, Alusian had several children, including:

1. Basil, an Eastern Roman general, governor of Edessa
2. Samuel, an Eastern Roman officer in the Armeniac theme
3. Anne, who married the future Eastern Roman Emperor Romanos IV Diogenes

== Sources ==
- Fine, John Van Antwerp (1994), The Late Medieval Balkans: A Critical Survey from the Late Twelfth Century to the Ottoman Conquest, University of Michigan Press, ISBN 978-0-472-08260-5
- Kazhdan, Alexander, ed. (1991), Oxford Dictionary of Byzantium, Oxford University Press, ISBN 978-0-19-504652-6

Preceded by Peter II Delyan	Emperor of Bulgaria; 1041	Succeeded by Byzantine rule
