= Proedros =

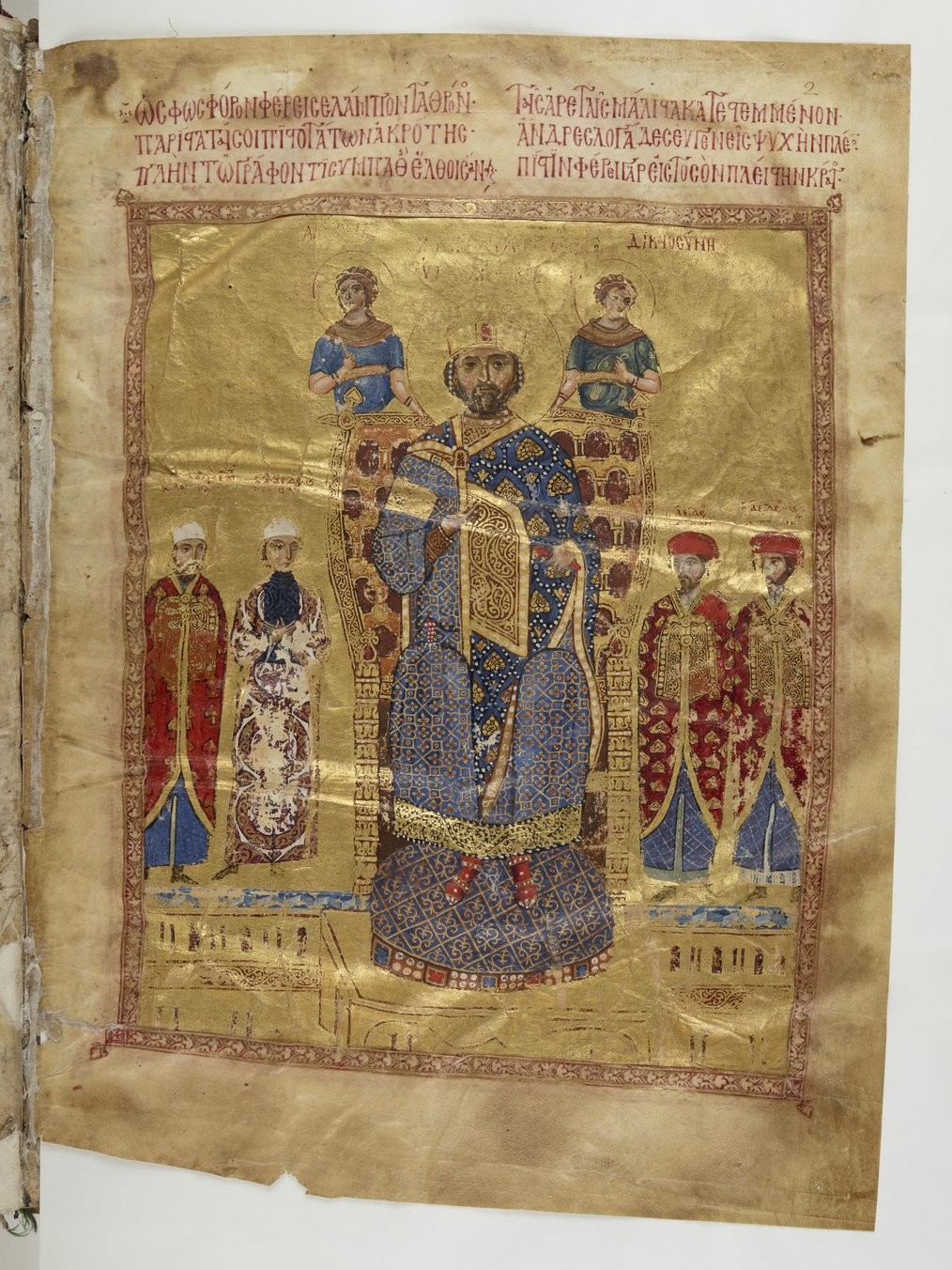
Emperor Nikephoros III flanked by his senior court dignitaries, all of them proedroi, in a manuscript from the 1070s. From left: the proedros and epi tou kanikleiou, the prōtoproedros and prōtovestiarios (a eunuch, since he is beardless), the emperor, the proedros and dekanos, and the proedros and megas primikērios.

Proedros (Greek: πρόεδρος, "president") was a senior Byzantine court and ecclesiastic title in the 10th to mid-12th centuries. The female form of the title is proedrissa (προέδρισσα).

== Court dignity ==
The title was created in the 960s by Nikephoros II Phokas and was first awarded to Basil Lekapenos, the eunuch parakoimōmenos. It was placed very high in the court hierarchy, coming immediately below the position of the zostē patrikia and before the magistros, meaning that it was the most senior non-imperial title open to males. The title apparently continued to be restricted to eunuchs until the mid-11th century, when it was opened up to the wider aristocracy and extensively awarded. The holder of this dignity was also the president of the Senate (ὁ πρόεδρος τῆς συγκλήτου), and the term proedros was often used to denote precedence in other offices, e.g. proedros of the notarioi for the prōtonotarios. The title was widely awarded in the 11th century, after it was opened up to non-eunuchs, prompting the creation of the prōtoproedros (πρωτοπρόεδρος, "first proedros") to distinguish the most senior amongst its holders. The title, along with most of the middle Byzantine court nomenclature, fell into gradual disuse in the Komnenian period, and disappeared in the latter 12th century. According to the De Ceremoniis (I.97) of Emperor Constantine VII Porphyrogennetos (r. 913–959), the clothing and insignia of the proedros in the 960s were: "a rose-colored and gold-embroidered tunic, a gem-encrusted belt, and a white chlamys [cloak] trimmed with golden bands and with two gold tablia [square patches] and decoration of ivy leaves."

== Ecclesiastic office ==
The term proedros was often used for a bishop, who was naturally the president of the local clergy, and in some rare cases for metropolitan bishops. In the 13th century, however, it acquired a more specific meaning: it was given to bishops who at the same time held jurisdiction over a vacant episcopal see. As the proedros of the vacant episcopal see, that bishop ran its administration, but was differentiated from the regular bishop, since he was never officially installed into that episcopal see. As in the court, the term proedros was also used to denote precedence among a group of officials.

== See also ==
- Prokathemenos
- Praeses
- Primicerius

== Sources ==
- Kazhdan, Alexander, ed. (1991). The Oxford Dictionary of Byzantium. Oxford and New York: Oxford University Press. ISBN 0-19-504652-8.
- Spatharakis, Ioannis (1976). The Portrait in Byzantine Illuminated Manuscripts. Leiden: E. J. Brill. ISBN 978-90-04-04783-9.
