= Byzantine conquest of Bulgaria =

Invasion of the First Bulgarian Empire (968–1018)

- Part of the Byzantine–Bulgarian wars
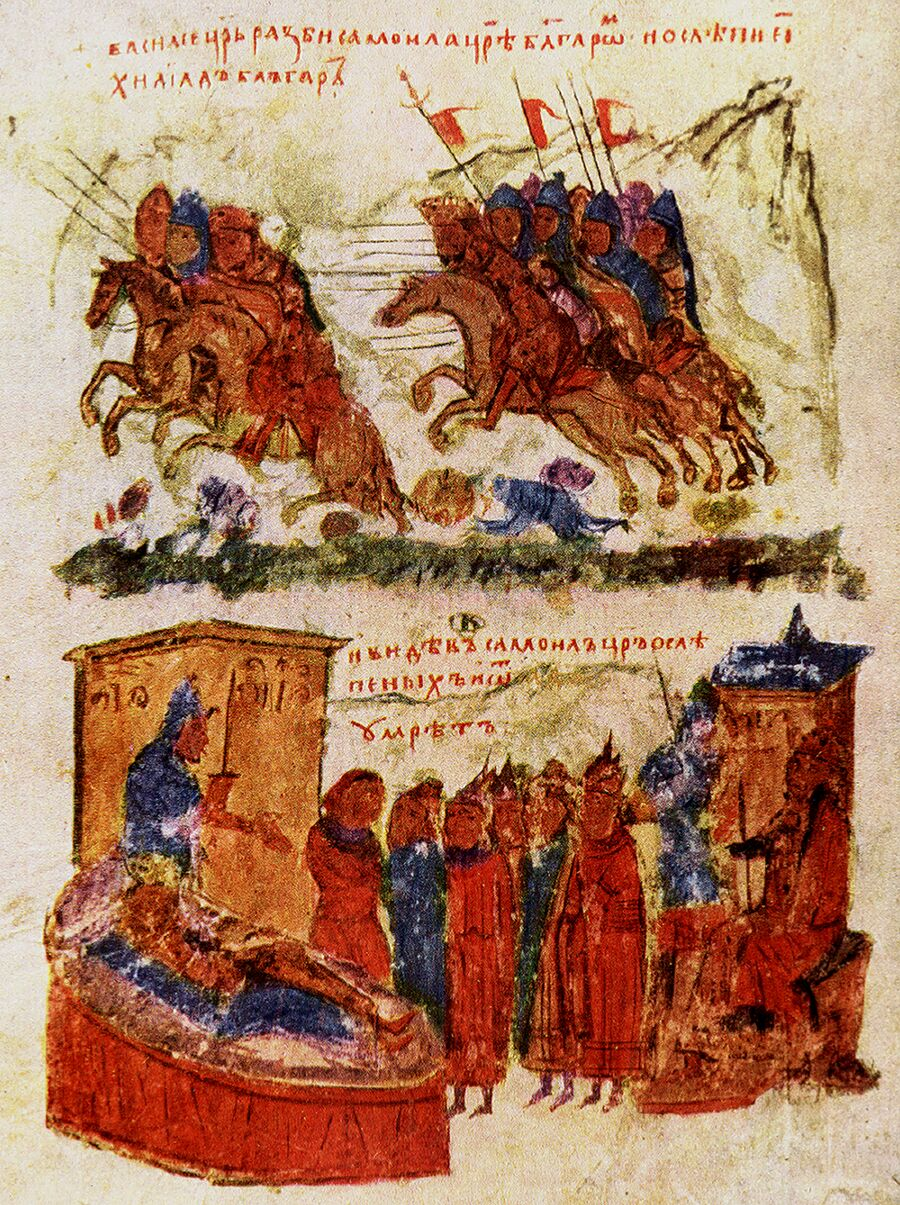
- The Byzantines defeat the Bulgarians at Kleidion and Tsar Samuel becomes unconscious at the sight of his blinded army. Scene from the Manasses Chronicle.
Date	968–February 1018 (50 years)
Location	Balkan Peninsula
Result	Byzantine victory
Territorial changes	Dissolution of the First Bulgarian Empire; Byzantium re-establishes control over Bulgaria and much of the Balkan Peninsula, Pechenegs settle in Wallachia.

Belligerents
Bulgarian Empire; Kievan Rus' (970–971); Pechenegs	Byzantine Empire; Kievan Rus' (968–969); Kingdom of Hungary; Principality of Duklja; Kingdom of Croatia

Commanders and leaders
Samuel # Roman (POW); Gavril Radomir X Ivan Vladislav †; Krakra (surrendered); Ivats (POW)	John I Tzimiskes; Basil II; Nikephoros Ouranos; Theophylact Botaneiates †; Nikephoros Xiphias; Constantine Diogenes; David Arianites

From c. 970 until 1018, a series of conflicts between the Bulgarian Empire and the Byzantine Empire led to the gradual reconquest of Bulgaria by the Byzantines, who thus re-established their control over the entire Balkan Peninsula for the first time since the 7th-century Slavic invasions. The struggle began with the incorporation of eastern Bulgaria after the Russo-Byzantine War (970–971). Bulgarian resistance was led by the Cometopuli brothers, who – based in the unconquered western regions of the Bulgarian Empire – led it until its fall under Byzantine rule in 1018.

As the Byzantine-Bulgarian relations deteriorated by the end of the 960s, the Eastern Roman Empire paid the Kievan prince Sviatoslav to attack Bulgaria. The unexpected collapse of Bulgaria and Sviatoslav's ambitions to seize Constantinople caught the Eastern Roman Empire off-guard but they managed to pull back the Kievan armies and occupied eastern Bulgaria including the capital Preslav in 971. Emperor Boris II was captured and taken to Constantinople where he abdicated and the Byzantine Emperor John I Tzimiskes announced the annexation of Bulgaria, even though the Eastern Roman Empire only controlled Eastern Bulgaria at the time, and the lands to the west remained under Bulgarian control. The four brothers David, Moses, Aron, and Samuel of the Cometopuli dynasty ruled in the free territories and in 976, launched a major offensive against the Byzantines to regain the lost lands. Soon, the youngest brother, Samuel, took complete authority following the deaths of his three eldest brothers.

Samuel proved to be a successful general inflicting a major defeat on the Byzantine army, commanded by Basil II at the Gates of Trajan and retaking north-eastern Bulgaria. His successful campaigns expanded the Bulgarian borders into Thessaly and Epirus and in 998, he conquered the principality of Duklja. In 997, Samuel was proclaimed Emperor of Bulgaria after the death of the legitimate ruler, Roman.

By the end of the millennium, the fortunes of war turned into Byzantine favour. The Byzantines under Basil II, a successful general and experienced soldier, slowly gained the upper hand and from 1001, started to seize a number of important areas and towns. The Bulgarians were unable to stop the annual Byzantine campaigns which devastated the country. In 1014, the Byzantines won the decisive Battle of Kleidion and Samuel died a few weeks later. Tsar Samuel's reign was followed by the short reigns of his son Gavril Radomir and his nephew Ivan Vladislav. In 1018, Ivan Vladislav's widow, Maria, negotiated very favorable terms of surrender to the Byzantine emperor. All local lords who surrendered were transferred either to Constantinople or to Anatolia and most of them were later assimilated into the Byzantine society. Bulgaria lost its independence and remained subject to Byzantium for more than a century and a half, until 1185. Its western part was transformed into one of the many Byzantine provinces, which was ruled by a governor appointed by the Emperor. With the collapse of the first Bulgarian state, the Bulgarian church fell under the domination of Greek ecclesiastics who took control of the see of Ohrid and attempted to replace the Bulgarian Slavic liturgy with a Greek liturgy.

== Background ==
During the reign of the Bulgarian emperor Peter I (927–969), the Magyars who had been temporarily contained by his father Simeon I started raiding the Bulgarian lands from 934 and Peter I's efforts to cope with them remained futile. On several occasions the Magyars reached Byzantine Thrace and looted it which was followed by Byzantine accusations that the Bulgarians were doing that on purpose and as a result the relations between the two countries quickly deteriorated. With no means to counter the Magyar threat, Peter I had to conclude an agreement with them in 965 according to which the Bulgarians had to give the Magyars free conduct through their lands to the Byzantine Empire and refuse any assistance to the Byzantine Emperor. The Byzantines responded in the spring of the following year and refused to pay the annual tribute to Bulgaria.

Roman emperor Nikephoros II Phokas (963–969), who had achieved decisive victories over the Arabs to the east insulted the Bulgarian ambassadors and launched a campaign. Upon approaching the Bulgarian border, however, he decided "not to lead his troops in those dangerous places and to give them to the Bulgarians to slaughter them as cattle." Soon after that military demonstration Phokas tried to restore the peace on condition that the Bulgarians would cancel their agreement with the Magyars which was refused by Peter I who reminded the Byzantine emperor that when Bulgaria needed help against the Magyars the Byzantines did not react and now that it had been forced to make peace with them it would be folly to break the treaty.

== Conquest ==
=== Nikephoros II Phokas' reign ===
In that situation Nikephoros II Phokas turned to the usual means of Byzantine diplomacy and decided to pay the Kievan prince Sviatoslav to attack Bulgaria. The noble Kalokyros to whom the mission was entrusted was successful and the spring of 968 the Rus' armies invaded Dobruja. Sviatoslav defeated the Bulgarian army and seized more than 80 fortresses which caused concern among the Byzantines who once again offered peace to Peter I but in the meantime Sviatoslav had to stop his campaign and return to his capital Kiev which was besieged by the Pechenegs. In 969 he returned to Bulgaria and soon after that Peter I suffered an epileptic stroke, abdicated and died on 30 January 970 as a monk. He was succeeded by his eldest son Boris II who had little choice but to cooperate with Sviatoslav, whose attention had by that time been diverted by Kalokyros to Constantinople.

=== John Tzimiskes' reign ===
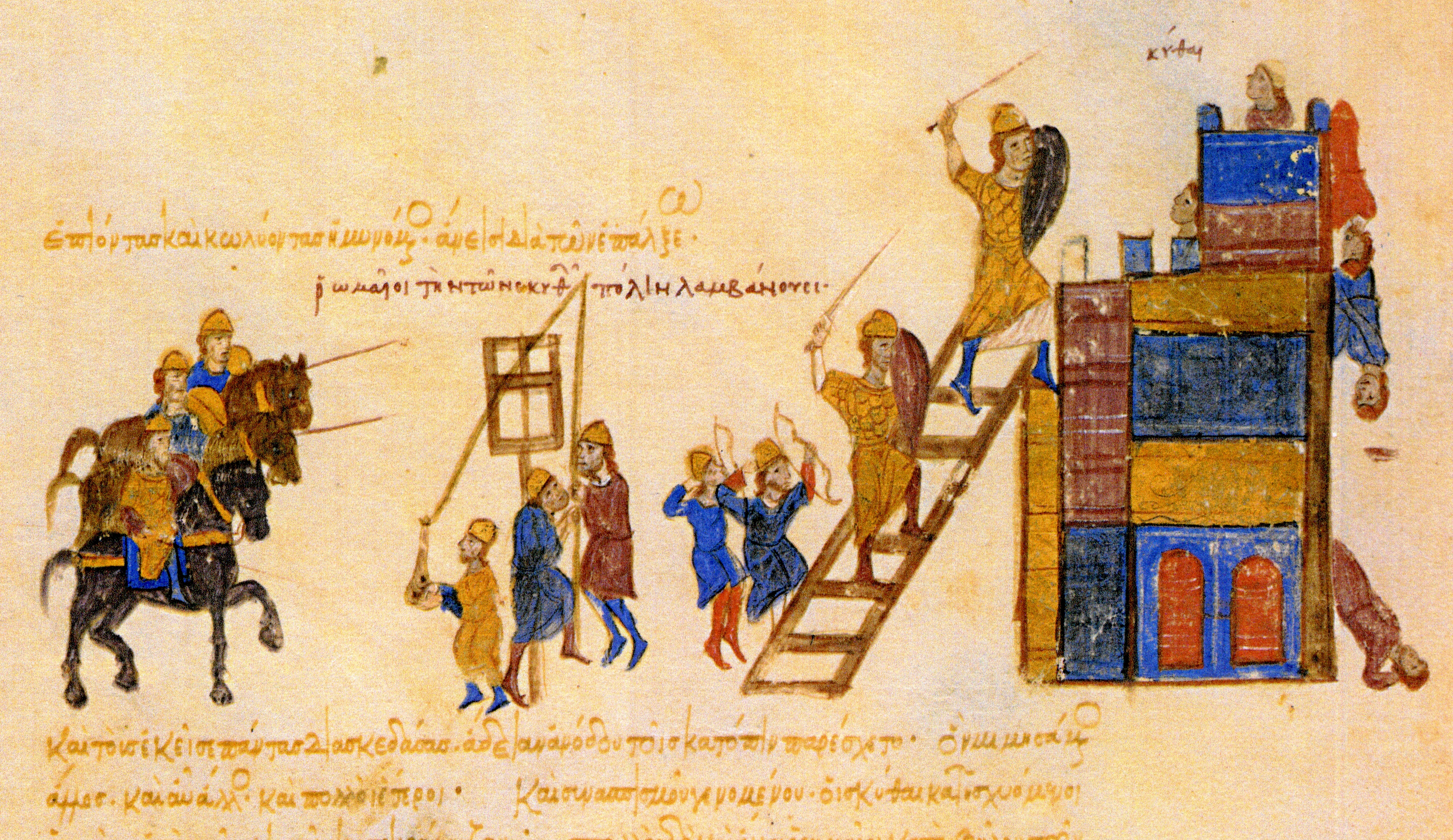
11th-13th century illustration of the Byzantine siege of Preslav

The new Byzantine emperor John Tzimiskes (969–976) scored a decisive victory over the Rus' and their Bulgarian allies in the battle of Arcadiopolis (970) and on 5 April 971 seized the Bulgarian capital Preslav where Boris II was captured along with his whole family. He was treated well and John Tzimiskes pretended to have come to liberate the Bulgarians from the Rus'. However, when Sviatoslav was finally defeated, Boris II was taken to Constantinople where he had to abdicate. He had to surrender the imperial insignia – the golden crown and the red boots – which were placed in the cathedral Hagia Sophia. In return he received the title magister. His brother Roman was castrated because the Byzantines needed to assure that the Krum dynasty would die away.

For John Tzimiskes that was a great triumph. The three-century old Byzantine dream to eliminate the Bulgarian state and restore the imperial borders along the Danube seemed to have come true. The annexation of Bulgaria was officially proclaimed, the political heart of the country in north-eastern Bulgaria along with Preslav, the old capital Pliska and the seat of the Bulgarian Patriarchate Drastar (Silistra) were occupied.

While the eastern parts of the empire were conquered and turned into a Byzantine province the lands to the west of Iskar river remained under Bulgarian control and included most of Macedonia, Albania and the lands to the south of the Danube between the Kolubara river (including Srem) to the west and the mountains around Etropole and Ihtiman to the east. These territories were ruled by the four brothers David, Moses, Aron and Samuel, sons of the governor (komita/comes) of Serdica (Sofia) Nikola. Information for the period between 971 and 976 in primary sources is very scarce.

=== Basil II's reign ===
In 976, Basil II became Roman emperor. In 986, he launched his first campaign into Bulgaria. He marched to Serdica, but had to retreat. At the Battle of the Gates of Trajan, Basil's army suffered a humiliating defeat. During the retreat, the Byzantines left behind their imperial tent and its supplies, while Basil was almost captured. For the next five years, Samuel faced little opposition, and he attacked Thessaloniki, a Byzantine city and stronghold. In spring 991, Basil launched another campaign on Bulgaria, but the details of this are slim.

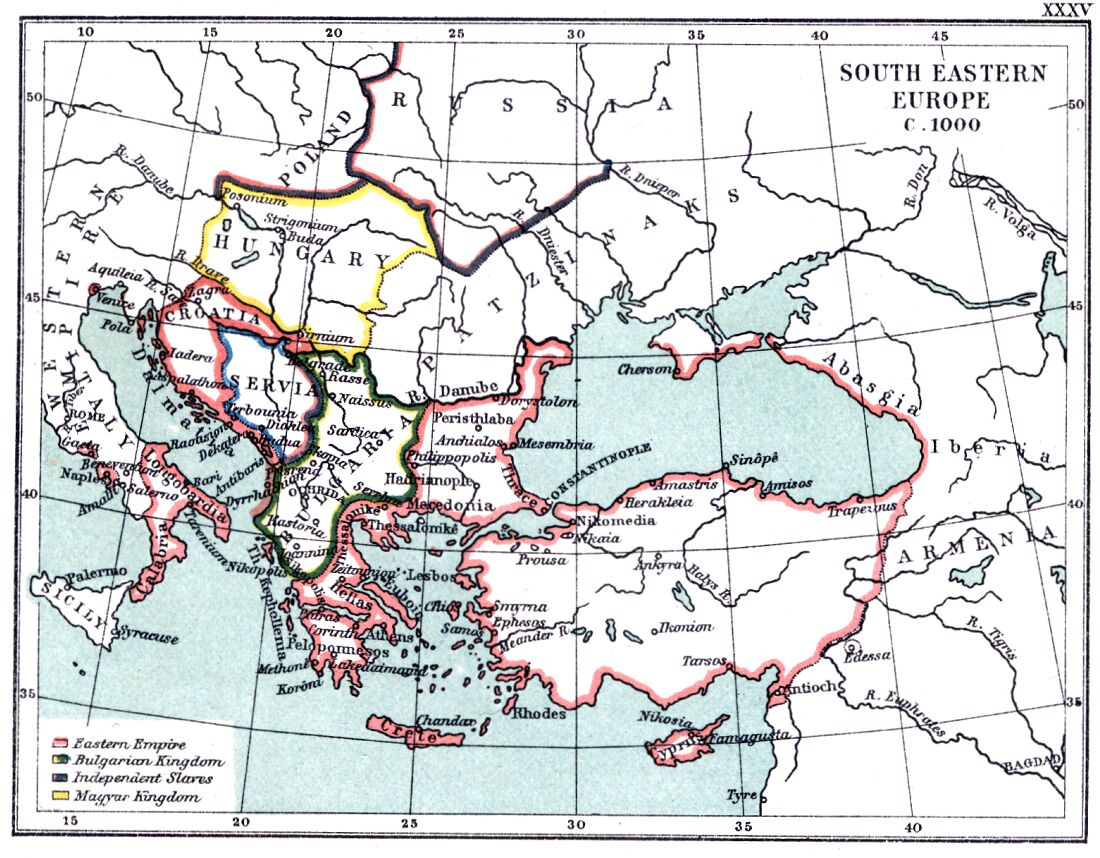
Territory of Byzantium and Bulgaria around 1000

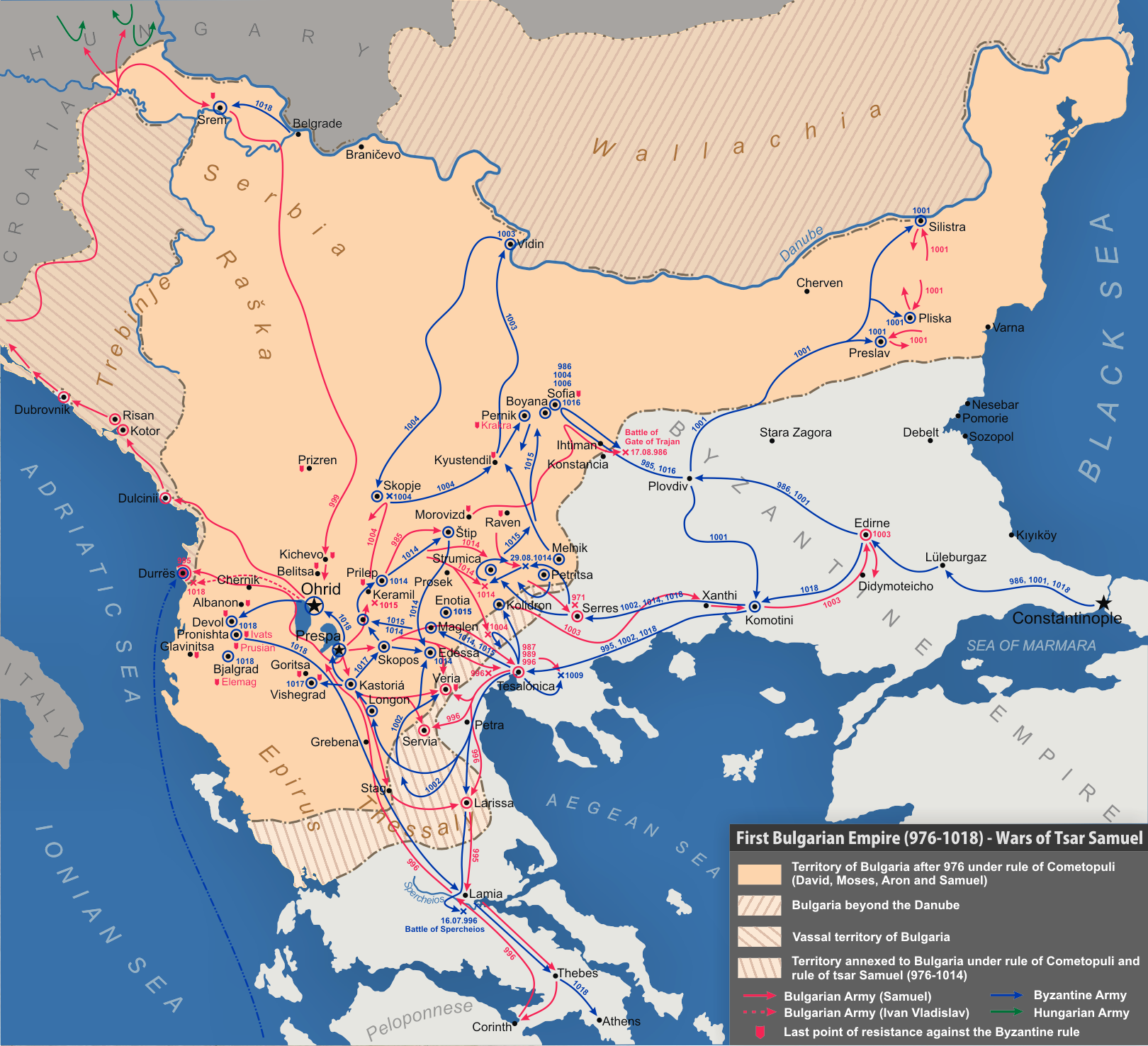
Map of Bulgaria in its largest extension during Samuel's reign circa 1000.

In 995, the Fatimids attacked the eastern Byzantine cities of Antioch and Aleppo, and Basil moved east to deal with the matter. He left in command of the Bulgarian command his confidant Nikephoros Ouranos. Ouranos' forces significantly defeated the Bulgarians at the Spercheios river. Samuel and his son Gabriel Radomir were wounded and hid among the dead bodies before they escaped. Samuel's ability to launch attacks into the western Byzantine Empire became limited, and he lost control of the city of Dyrrachion (modern Durrës). The city was previously controlled by Samuel, as he had married the city's leader Chryselios; after the Battle of Spercheios, Samuel gave the city to his son-in-law, Ashot, but Ashot fled the city, giving it to Basil.

By 1000, Basil II was ready to launch another campaign into Bulgaria, and in 1001, he marched towards Serdica. His generals Theodorokanos and Nikephoros Xiphias quickly took the northeast, taking back Preslav and Pliska. Basil had success taking Bulgarian fortresses as he moved to the northwest in 1002, but was unable to take the fortress of Pernik. He besieged the city of Vidin for eight months. Some historians believe Basil signed a peace treaty with Samuel in 1005 which lasted until 1014. Others say he might have launched annual campaigns into Bulgaria in that time, but there are no accounts of this.

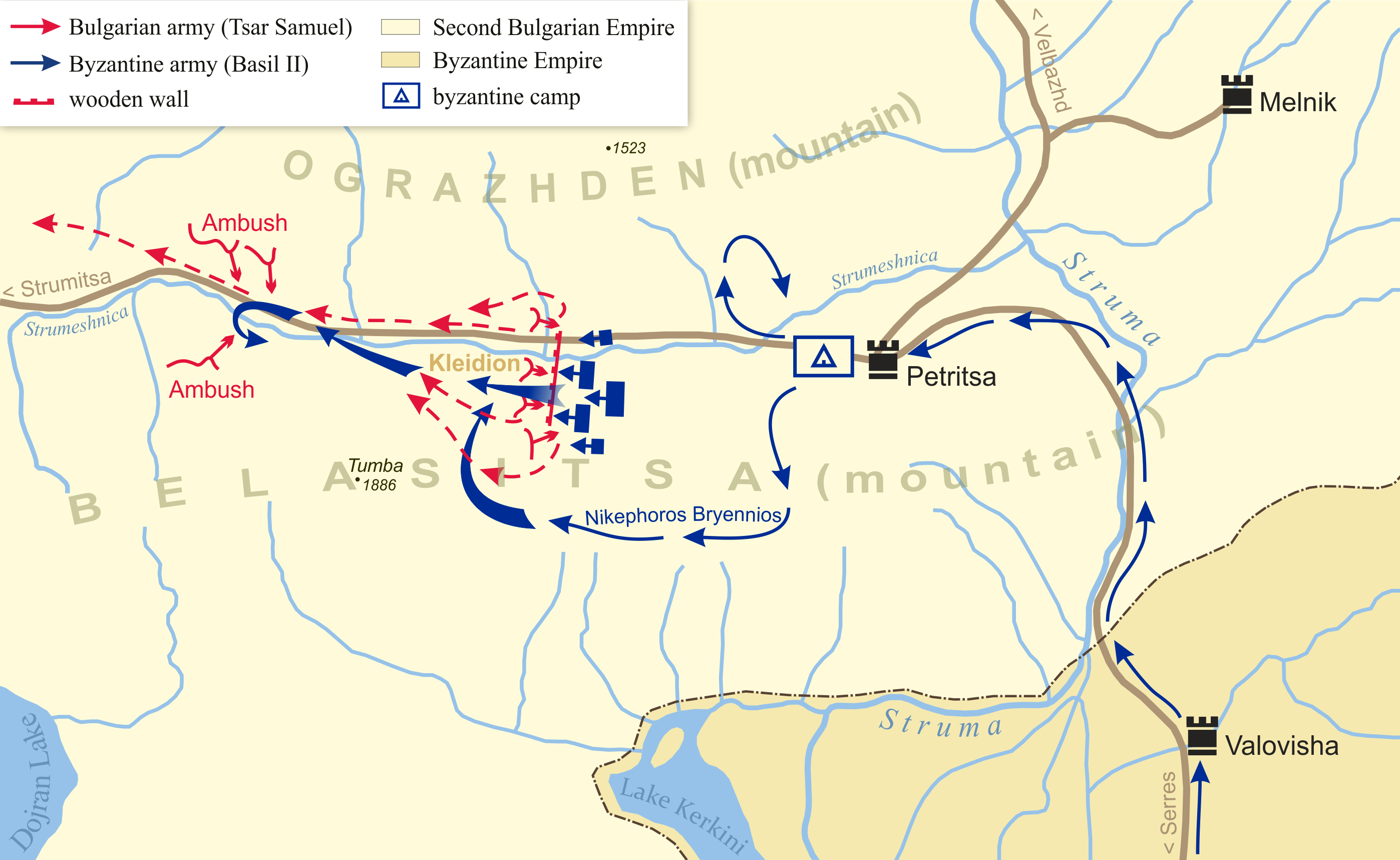
A map of the Battle of Kleidion in 1014

The Battle of Kleidion took place on 29 July 1014. The Bulgarian army lost significantly, and some medieval historians say the Byzantines took around 15,000 Bulgarian prisoners and blinded them. Multiple sources corroborate this, but it is unlikely the number was so big, as the Bulgarians fought for four more years, and it is unlikely they could have done so with 15,000 less soldiers. In October 1014, Samuel died, creating a succession crisis between "Samuel's son, his nephew, and other magnates". Basil used this opportunity to his advantage, and the fighting with the Bulgarians escalated over the next few years.

Multiple Bulgarian fortress were captured in 1015, and the Byzantines besieged the city of Vodena (modern Edessa). Different sources give varying opinions over who was more successful that year. In 1016, Basil II besieged the Pernik fortress again, but was still unsuccessful, so he retreated to Mosynopolis. John Vladislav, Gabriel Radomir's cousin, then killed Radomir. Krakras, a Bulgarian commander - who defended Pernik in 1002 and likely was still in charge during its siege in 1016 - went to join Vladislav in launching a large counterattack on Basil in 1017, but then Vladislav was killed at Dyrrachion in February 1018. Krakras surrendered to Basil, and other Bulgarian commanders soon followed. The Byzantines then took control of Bulgaria.

Once opposition had ceased, Basil showed considerable statesmanship in his dealings with the Bulgarians. He wisely accepted Bulgarian taxes in kind rather than in coinage, as a full monetary economy was not established in Bulgaria. Many of the Bulgarian elite were integrated into Byzantine society, being given military or civil positions within the Byzantine state. This integration is illustrated by Vladislav being an ancestor of the Byzantine emperor John II Komnenos.

== Sources ==
- Andreev, Jordan; Milcho Lalkov (1996). The Bulgarian Khans and Tsars (in Bulgarian). Abagar. ISBN 954-427-216-X.
- Curta, Florin (2006), Southeastern Europe in the Middle Ages, 500–1250, Cambridge University Press, ISBN 978-0-521-81539-0
- Fine, John V. A. Jr. (1991) [1983]. The Early Medieval Balkans: A Critical Survey from the Sixth to the Late Twelfth Century. Ann Arbor: University of Michigan Press. ISBN 0-472-08149-7.
- Holmes, Catherine (2005), Basil II and the Governance of Empire (976–1025), Oxford University Press, ISBN 978-0-19-927968-5
- Kazhdan, Alexander, ed. (1991). The Oxford Dictionary of Byzantium. Oxford and New York: Oxford University Press. ISBN 0-19-504652-8.
- Magdalino, Paul, ed. (2002), Byzantium in the Year 1000, Brill, ISBN 90-04-12097-1
- Obolensky, Dimitri (1974) [1971]. The Byzantine Commonwealth: Eastern Europe, 500–1453. London: Cardinal. ISBN 978-0351176449.
- Runciman, Steven (1930), A History of the First Bulgarian Empire, London: George Bell & Sons, OCLC 832687
- Stephenson, Paul (2000), Byzantium's Balkan Frontier: A Political Study of the Northern Balkans, 900–1204, Cambridge University Press, ISBN 0-521-77017-3
- Stephenson, Paul (2003), The Legend of Basil the Bulgar-slayer, Cambridge University Press, ISBN 9780521815307
- Stoimenov, D., Temporary Byzantine Military Administration in the Bulgarian Lands 971–987/989, Yearbook of the Sofia University
- Strässle, Paul Meinrad (2006), Krieg und Kriegführung in Byzanz: die Kriege Kaiser Basileios' II. gegen die Bulgaren (976–1019) (in German), Böhlau Verlag, ISBN 978-3-412-17405-7
- Treadgold, Warren (1997). A History of the Byzantine State and Society. Stanford, California: Stanford University Press. ISBN 0-8047-2630-2.
- Whittow, Mark (1996), The Making of Byzantium, 600–1025, University of California Press, ISBN 0-520-20496-4
- Zlatarski, Vasil (1971) [1927]. История на българската държава през средните векове. Том I. История на Първото българско царство, Част II. От славянизацията на държавата до падането на Първото царство (852–1018) [History of Bulgaria in the Middle Ages. Vol. 1. History of the First Bulgarian Empire, Part 2.From the Slavicization of the state to the fall of the First Empire (852–1018)]. Sofia: Nauka i izkustvo. OCLC 67080314.
