= Battle of the Gates of Trajan =

986 battle of the Byzantine–Bulgarian Wars

- Part of the Byzantine–Bulgarian wars
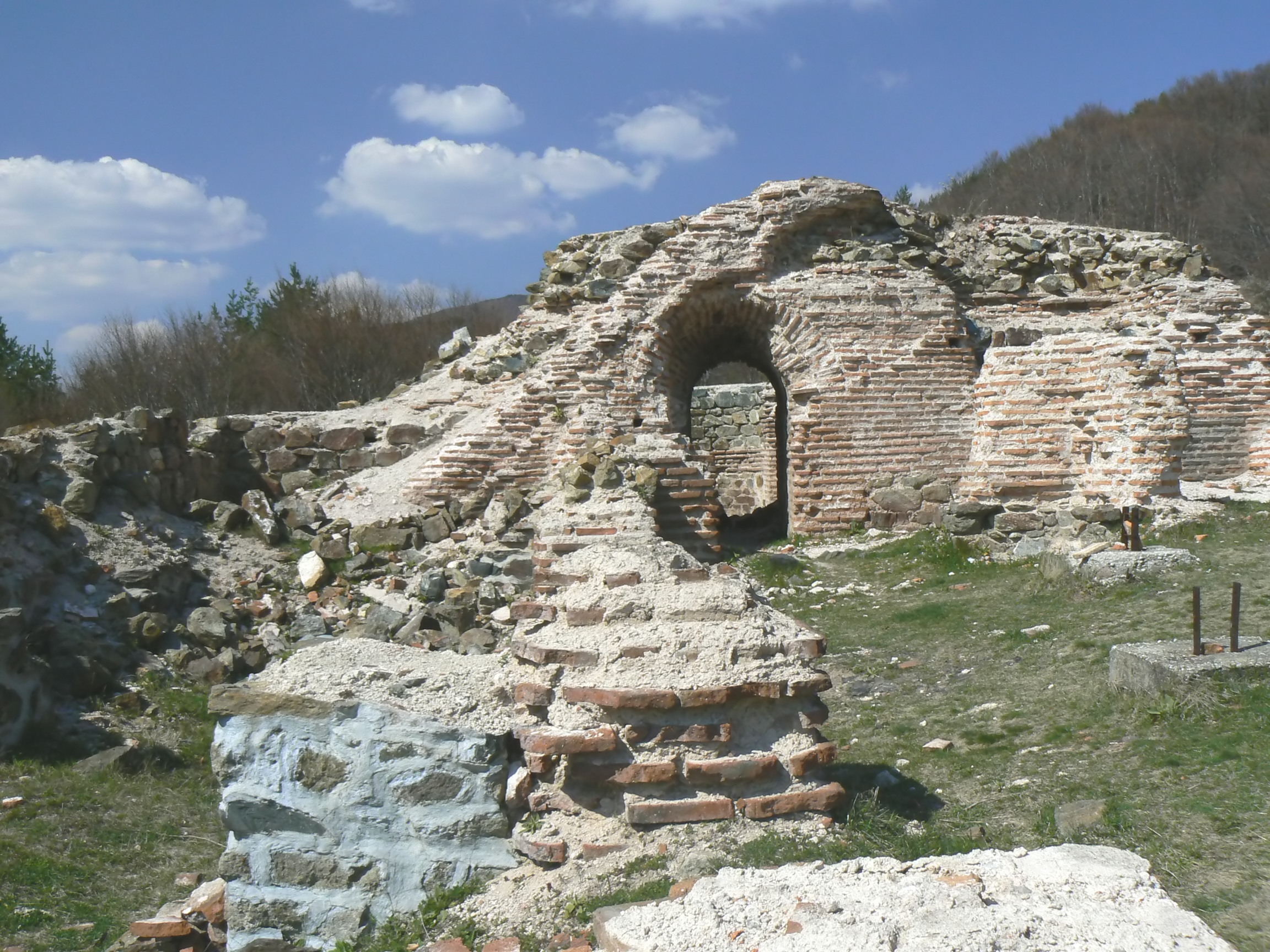
- Ruins of the fortress Gates of Trajan
Date	17 August 986
Location	The Gate of Trajan pass, Bulgaria 42°21′22″N 23°55′6″E
Result	Bulgarian victory

Belligerents
First Bulgarian Empire	Byzantine Empire

Commanders and leaders
Samuil of Bulgaria; Roman of Bulgaria	Basil II

Strength
Unknown	15,000–20,000

Casualties and losses
Unknown (Light)	Unknown (Heavy)
- Location within Bulgaria

The Battle of the Gates of Trajan (Bulgarian: Битка край Траянови врати, Medieval Greek: Μάχη στις Πύλες του Τραϊανού) was a battle between Byzantine and Bulgarian forces in the year 986.

It took place in the pass of the same name, modern Trayanovi Vrata, in Sofia Province, Bulgaria. It was the largest defeat of the Byzantines under Emperor Basil II. After the unsuccessful siege of Sofia he retreated to Thrace, but was surrounded by the Bulgarian army under the command of Samuel in the Sredna Gora mountains. The Byzantine army was annihilated and Basil himself barely escaped.

Fifteen years after the fall and re-capture of the Bulgarian capital of Preslav, the victory at the Gates of Trajan extended the Bulgarian successes achieved since 976. Later on Tsar Samuel moved the capital from Preslav in the northeast to Ohrid in the southwest. The memory of the great victory over Basil II was preserved thirty years later in the Bitola inscription of Ivan Vladislav (1015–1018), the son of Aron.

== Historical sources ==
In addition to the Bitola inscription where the victory of Samuel, commander of the Bulgarian army, is mentioned in summary form, several medieval historians have written accounts for the battle. Among them were Leo the Deacon who was an eyewitness and a direct participant in the campaign; John Skylitzes and two other historians George Kedrin and Joannes Zonaras who repeat the work of Skylitzes. Not only Byzantine historians wrote accounts for the battle, it was also recorded by the Melkite chronicler Yahaya of Antioch and the Armenians Stephen of Taron (also known as Asolic) and Matthew of Edessa. More details can be found in the commended sermon of Saint Photius of Thessaly.

== Origins of the conflict ==
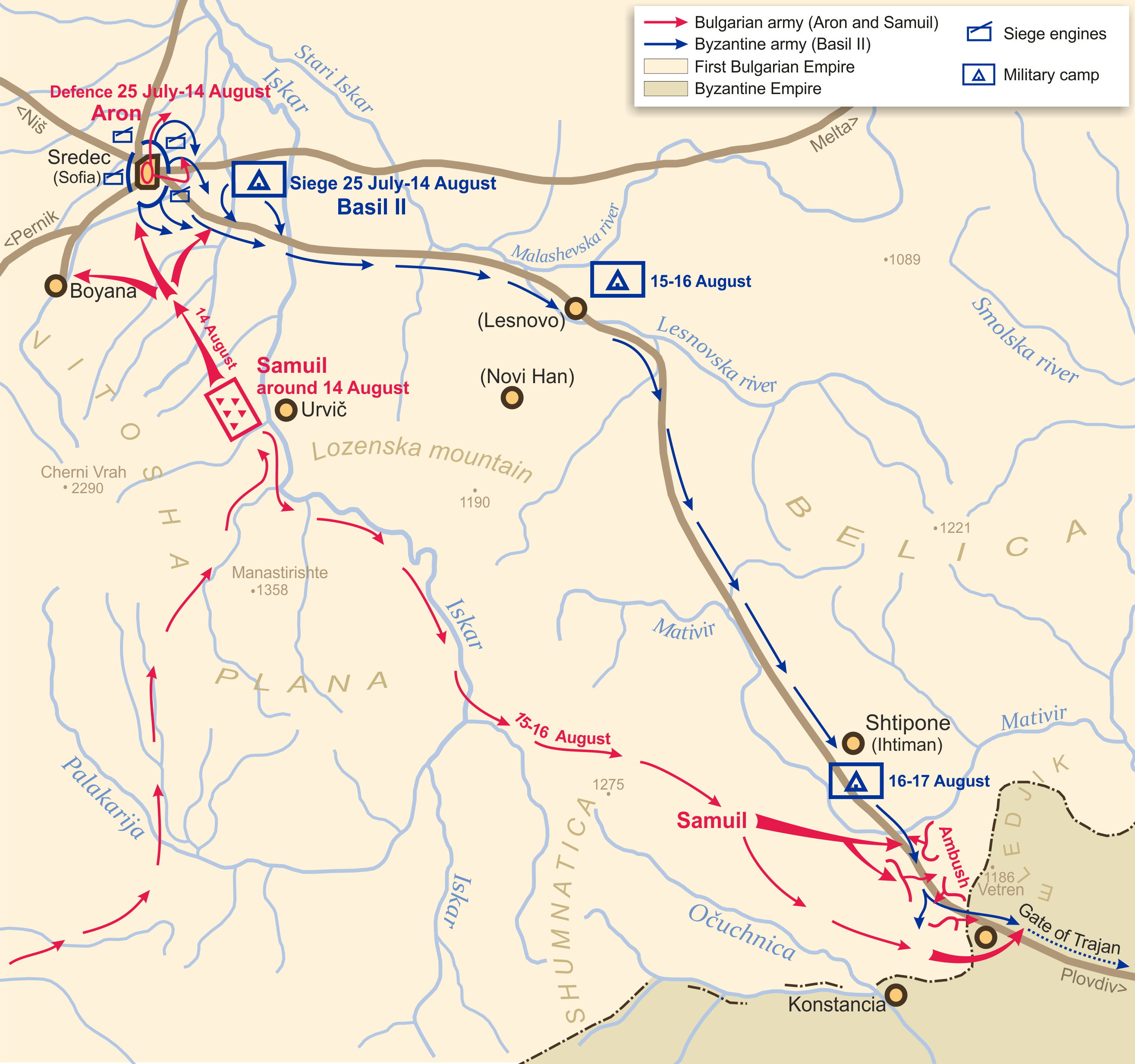
Plan of the battle.

In 971, the Byzantine emperor John Tzimiskes forced the captured Bulgarian emperor Boris II to abdicate and move to Constantinople following the fall of the Bulgarian capital Preslav. The Byzantines had occupied only the eastern parts of Bulgaria; to the west, the four sons of the count of Sredets Nikola (David, Moses, Samuil and Aron) continued to rule western Bulgaria. They ruled the free territories in a tetrarchy residing in four separate cities in order to fight the Byzantines with higher efficiency.

The war against Bulgaria was the first major undertaking carried out by Basil II after his ascension to the throne in 976, although the Bulgarian attacks had begun in that year. One of the reasons for the ten years of inaction was the policy of one of the strongest nobles in Byzantium, Basil Lekapenos, who de facto ruled the Byzantine Empire in the first years of Basil II's reign. During that time, the main objective of the government in Constantinople was to crush the rebellion of the military commander Bardas Skleros in Asia Minor between 976 and 979.

The local Byzantine governors were left alone to cope with the Bulgarian threat but they were unable to stop the Bulgarians. The positions of the brothers Samuil and Aron (the two eldest brothers David and Moses died soon after the beginning of the great offensive in 976) were strengthened not only by the rebellion of Skleros but also the neglect of the former Byzantine Emperor John Tzimiskes towards the southwestern Bulgarian lands. After the fall of Preslav and the north-eastern areas of the Bulgarian Empire his main priority became the war against the Arabs in Syria, which gave the Bulgarians time to prepare for a long struggle from the center of the remaining parts of the Empire around the Ohrid and Prespa Lakes.

For one decade after 976 Bulgarian offensives achieved major successes. Samuil managed to liberate north-eastern Bulgaria. Between 982 and 986 the Bulgarians occupied the main city of Thessaly (in modern Greece), Larissa. The constant Bulgarian attacks forced Basil II to respond.

== Siege of Serdica ==
In 986, Basil II led a campaign with 15,000 to 20,000 soldiers. The commanders of the eastern armies did not take part in the campaign because they were fighting with the Arabs. The Byzantines marched from Odrin via Plovdiv to reach Sredets. According to Leo Diaconus the objective of their Emperor was to subdue the Bulgarians with one strike. After the capture of Serdica, which was a strategic fortress between the northeastern and southwestern Bulgarian lands, Basil II intended to continue his campaign towards Samuil's main strongholds in Bulgaria.

On his way to Serdica Basil II left a strong company under Leon Melissenos to guard the rear of the Byzantine army. When he finally reached the walls of the city, Basil II built a fortified camp and besieged the fortress. After 20 days of fruitless assaults, the Byzantine army ran short of food. Their attempts to find provisions in the surrounding country were stopped by the Bulgarians who burned crops and even took the cattle of the Byzantines. In the end, the city garrison sallied out of the city, killing many enemy soldiers and burning all of the siege equipment, which the inexperienced Byzantine generals had placed too close to the city walls.

== The battle ==
Even if the sun would have come down, I would have never thought that the Moesian [Bulgarian] arrows were stronger than the Avzonian [Greek, Byzantine] spears.
... And when you, Phaethon [Sun], descend to the earth with your gold-shining chariot, tell the great soul of the Caesar: The Danube [Bulgaria] took the crown of Rome. The arrows of the Moesians broke the spears of the Avzonians.

— John Geometres on the Battle of the Gates of Trajan

As a result of the successful Bulgarian actions the Byzantines were no longer capable of taking the city with a direct assault. They also could not exhaust the defenders with hunger because, after their supplies were cut, the Byzantines themselves had to deal with that problem. In addition, an army led by Samuil marched into the mountains at the Byzantines' rear. In the meantime, instead of securing the way for retreat, Leon Melissenos pulled back to Plovdiv. That action was an additional reason for Basil II to lift the siege. The commander of the Western armies, Kontostephanos, persuaded him that Melissenos had set off to Constantinople to take his throne.

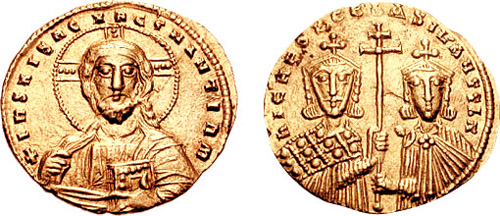
Basil II and his stepfather, Emperor Nikephoros II (right).

The Byzantine army retreated from the Sofia Valley towards Ihtiman where it stopped for the night. The rumours that the Bulgarians had barred the nearby mountain routes stirred commotion among the soldiers and on the following day the retreat continued in growing disorder. When the Bulgarians under Samuil and probably Roman saw that, they rushed to the enemy camp and the retreat turned to flight. The Byzantine vanguard managed to squeeze through slopes which were not yet taken by the Bulgarian attackers. The rest of the army was surrounded by the Bulgarians. Only the elite Armenian unit from the infantry managed to break out with heavy casualties and to lead their Emperor to safety through secondary routes. Enormous numbers of Byzantine soldiers perished in the battle; the rest were captured along with the Imperial insignia.

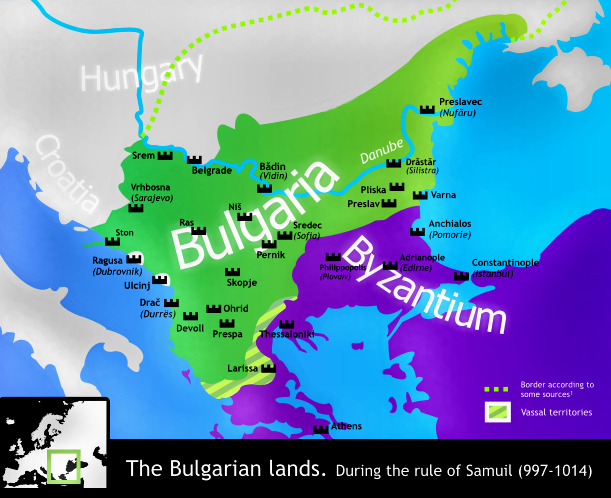
Bulgaria in the years after the battle.

== Aftermath ==
The disaster of the campaign in Bulgaria in 986 was a blow to the consolidation of the monocracy of Basil II. Soon after the Battle of the Gates of Trajan, the nobility in Asia Minor, led by the general Bardas Phokas, rebelled against Basil II for three years.

According to the historian Petar Mutafchiev, after the battle Samuil was in control of the Balkans. According to some historians, the northeastern parts of the Bulgarian Empire were liberated in the years after the battle. However, according to other sources, they were liberated ten years prior to the battle, in 976. The Bulgarians firmly took the initiative and launched continuous attacks towards Thessaloniki, Edessa, and the Adriatic coast. The Serbs were also defeated and their state incorporated into Bulgaria.

== See also ==
- Medieval Bulgarian army
- Byzantine army
