= Cometopuli dynasty =

Bulgarian royal dynasty (c. 976–1018)

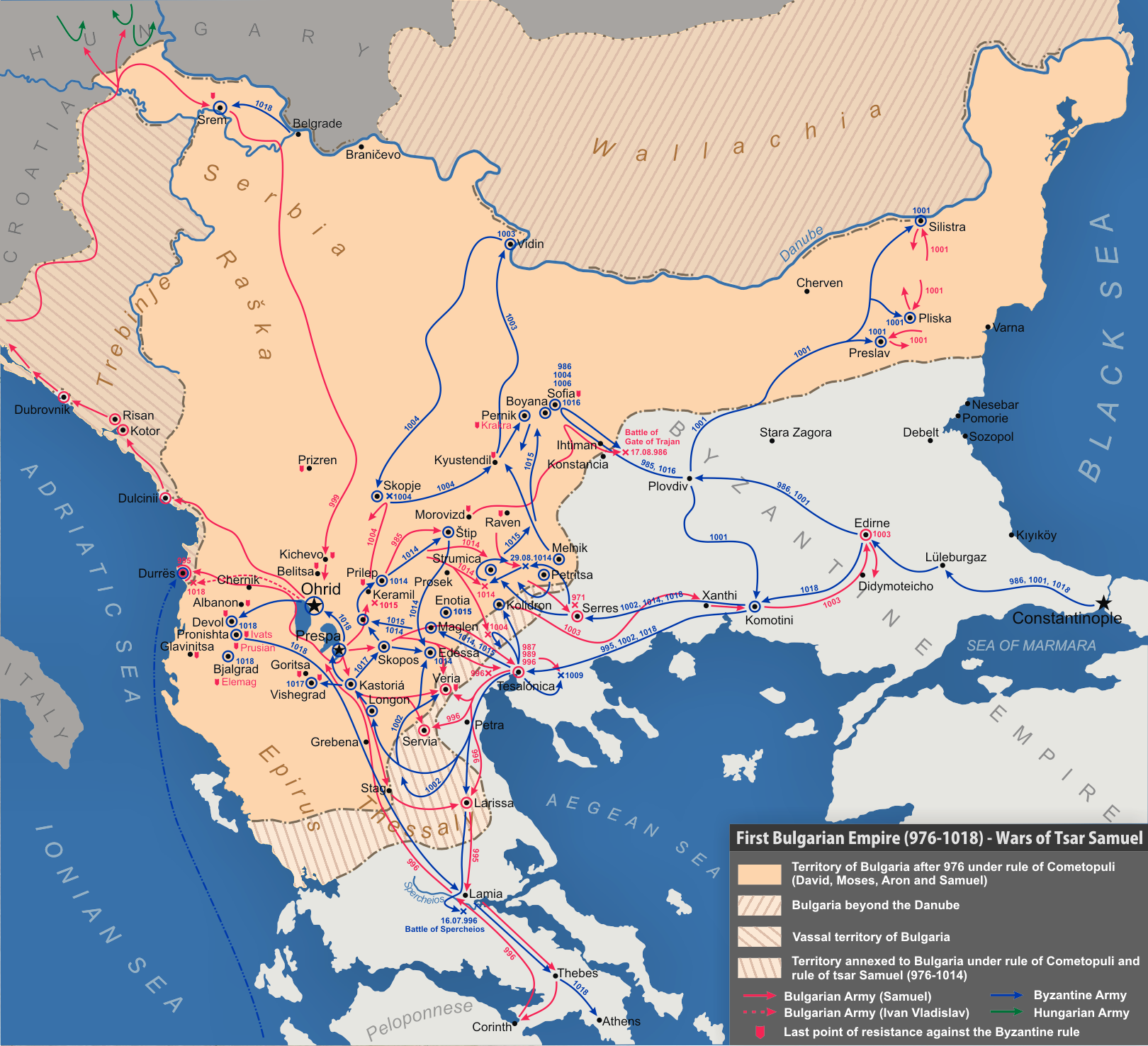
Map of Bulgaria under the Kometopuli (976–1018).

Territory of former Bulgaria c. 1045 as theme.

The Kometopuli dynasty (Bulgarian: Династия на комитопулите, Dinastiya na komitopulite; Byzantine Greek: Δυναστεία Κομητoπούλων, Dynasteía Kometopoulon) was the last royal dynasty in the First Bulgarian Empire, ruling from c. 976 until the fall of Bulgaria under Byzantine rule in 1018. The most notable member of the dynasty, Tsar Samuel, is famous for successfully resisting Byzantine conquest for more than 40 years. Sometimes the realm of the Cometopuli is called Western Bulgarian Kingdom or Western Bulgarian Empire.

== Origin and members ==
The actual name of the dynasty is not known. Cometopuli (Bulgarian: Комитопули, Komitopuli; Byzantine Greek: Κομητόπουλοι, Kometópouloi (Note: Greek: Κομητόπουλοι, Komitópouloi)) is merely the nickname which is used by Byzantine historians to address rulers from the dynasty as its founder, Nicholas, was a komes (governor, cognate to "count"; Byzantine Greek: κóμης, kómes, (Note: Greek: κóμης, kómis) from the Latin comes; Bulgarian: комита, komita) either of the region of Sredets (the present-day capital of Bulgaria, Sofia) or of the region of Prespa. According to the 11th century Armenian historian, Stepanos Asoghik, the dynasty was of Armenian origin and had probably been part of the heretical Christian Paulican sect. However, Michael Palairet affirms that count Nicholas' family name is Shishman, a family name not of Armenian origin, which centuries later became a Bulgarian royal dynasty. In 969 AD and following the Russo-Byzantine conquest of Eastern Bulgaria, count Nikola assumed control of the Bulgarian lands west of the rivers Iskar and Struma. By the time of the Byzantine conquest of Preslav and the dethronement of Tsar Boris II in 972, Nikola had been killed and the rule assumed by his four sons, David, Aron, Moses, and Samuil. David led the defence of southwestern Bulgaria and resided in Prespa, Moses of southeastern Bulgaria residing in Strumica, Aron ruled over the region of Sredets, whereas Samuel was in charge of northern Bulgaria with the town of Bdin (Vidin).

Both David and Moses lost their lives early – David was murdered by wandering Vlachs, whereas Moses died during the siege of Serres. A conflict broke out between Samuil and Aron as the latter grew more and more pro-Byzantine and on 14 June 976 Aron was executed near Dupnitza. Later the same year, the dethroned Boris II and his brother, Roman, managed to escape from captivity in Constantinople and reached the borders of Bulgaria. Boris II was, however, killed by mistake by the border guards. As a result, it was Roman who was crowned as Bulgarian Tsar although real power and the control of the army lay in the hands of Samuil.

Samuel proved to be a successful leader inflicting a major defeat on the Byzantine army commanded by Basil II at the Gates of Trajan and retaking north-eastern Bulgaria. His successful campaigns expanded the Bulgarian borders into Thessaly and Epirus and in 998 he conquered the principality of Duklja. In 997 Samuel was proclaimed Emperor of Bulgaria after the death of the legitimate ruler, Roman. However, Basil II's campaign soon started producing one success after the other: in 1001 he seized Pliska and Preslav in the east. In 1003 a major offensive along the Danube resulted in the fall of Vidin after an eight-month siege, and in 1004 Basil II defeated Samuel in the battle of Skopje and took possession of the city. This war of attrition dragged on for a decade until 1014, when the Bulgarians were decisively defeated at Kleidion. Some 14,000 Bulgarians were captured; it is said that 99 out of every 100 men were blinded, with the remaining hundredth man left with one eye so as to lead his compatriots home, earning Basil II the moniker "Bulgaroktonos", the Bulgar-Slayer. When the soldiers arrived in Samuel's residence in Prespa, the Bulgarian Emperor suffered a heart attack at the grisly sight and died two days later, on 6 October.

After the death of Samuel in 1014, the crown passed on to his son, Gavril Radomir (1014–1015). In 1015, he was murdered by his first cousin and son of Aaron, Ivan Vladislav. With his own death in 1018 the First Bulgarian Empire came to an end. Ivan Vladislav's sons Presian, Alusian and Aaron surrendered shortly after and were integrated into the court nobility in Constantinople. An attempt at restoration of Bulgarian independence was made some 20 years later by Peter (II) Delyan (1040–1041), son of Gavril Radomir. He, aided by his cousin Alusian organised an uprising and managed to push away the Byzantines from Ohrid for a short period, but was eventually betrayed by Alusian. Alusian's heirs were given noble titles and land in the Byzantine Empire.

== Family tree ==
After the Byzantine conquest of Bulgaria, the Cometopuli assumed important positions in the Byzantine court after they were resettled and given lands in Asia Minor and Armenia. Catherine, daughter of Bulgarian Emperor Ivan Vladislav, became empress of Byzantium. Peter II Delyan, son of Bulgarian Emperor Gavril Radomir and grandson of Emperor Samuel, led an attempt to restore the Bulgarian Empire after a major uprising in 1040 – 1041. Two other women of the dynasty became Byzantine empresses, while many nobles served in the army as strategos or became governors of various provinces. Through his maternal grandmother Maria of Bulgaria, the Byzantine emperor John II Komnenos was a descendant of Emperor Ivan Vladislav.

Comita; Nikola | Ripsimia of Armenia
David | Moses | Aron | Samuel of Bulgaria | Agatha
Ivan; Vladislav | Maria | others | Miroslava | unknown daughter | unknown daughter | Gavril; Radomir
Presian | Aron | Alusian | Troian | Catherine | Isaac I Komnenos | Peter; Delyan

== Nomenclature ==
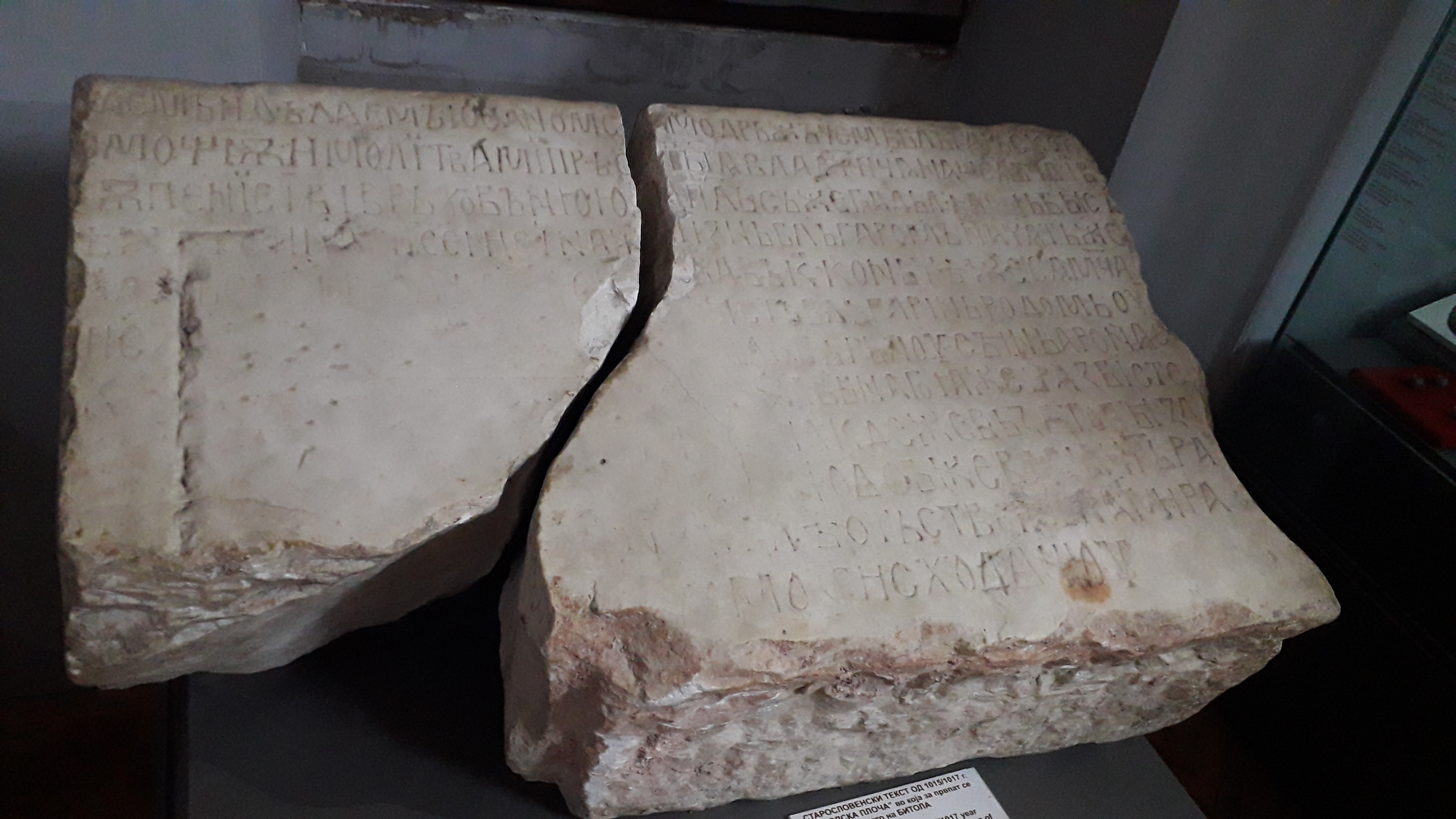
The Bitola inscription of Ivan Vladislav, where he claims Bulgarian origin to himself and to his people.

Contemporary Byzantine sources, contemporary Arab sources, contemporary Bulgarian sources (see Bitola inscription) and the vast majority of modern scholars view the Cometopuli dynasty as an integral part and direct continuation of the First Bulgarian Empire. In this connection, reference is made, among other things, to Basil II's nickname, the "Bulgar-Slayer", the Cometopuli's self-designation and designation of their state as "Bulgarians" and "Bulgaria", the designation "Archbishopric of Justiniana Prima and all Bulgaria" given to the successor of the autocephalous Bulgarian Patriarchate, the designation "Theme of Bulgaria" of the theme created out of the conquered Cometopuli's state, etc. etc. For example, according to John Fine:

"Scholars at times (particularly Macedonian scholars who want to depict this as a distinctly Macedonian state) have tried to stress the differences between Samuel's state and the earlier Bulgarian state. The main difference seems to lie in the geographical locations of their centers; the earlier state had been centered near the Danube while Samuel's state was centered to the west in Macedonia. However, this geographical difference is quite irrelevant. Macedonia was simply a geographical term; there was then no Macedonian ethnic awareness. And though some historians may stress the Slavic character of Macedonia and claim there had never been Bulgars here, this too has little meaning. By Samuel's time whatever Bulgars there had been anywhere in Bulgaria or Macedonia were slavicized; moreover, Kuver's activities in Macedonia would have given this area some earlier Bulgar background as well. What is important is that Samuel called his state Bulgarian, a fact which shows that he considered it Bulgarian; furthermore, Byzantine sources called it Bulgarian also and treat Samuel simply as a ruler, continuing the former Bulgarian state."

Nevertheless, two Byzantinologists working during the Cold War, George Ostrogorsky and Dimitri Obolensky have questioned this, to various degrees, as its centres, Skopje, Ohrid, Prespa and Bitola, are located in what is currently referred to as the geographical region of Macedonia (however, the region at the time was known as Kutmichevitsa, whereas the theme of Macedonia was in Southern Thrace, with a capital at Adrianople). George Ostrogorsky discusses the issue and concludes that to its creators and to the Byzantines it was simply Bulgarian kingdom, but for various geographical, political and religious factors he labels their state Macedonian Empire. Dimitri Obolensky refers to Samuil's state as an "independent empire of Western Bulgaria" that originated in Macedonia. Historians in North Macedonia (see Macedonian historiography) refer to the Cometopuli's state as a "Slavic Macedonian" Empire. However, this view is regarded as an example of backdated modern nationalism. For example, in his history of the medieval Balkans, Fine notes:

"Until the late nineteenth century both outside observers and those Bulgaro-Macedonians who had an ethnic consciousness believed that their group, which is now two separate nationalities, comprised a single people, the Bulgarians. Thus the reader should ignore references to ethnic Macedonians in the Middle Ages which appear in some modern works. In the Middle Ages and into the nineteenth century, the term Macedonian was used entirely in reference to a geographical region. Anyone who lived within its confines, regardless of nationality, could be called a Macedonian. Nevertheless, the absence of a national consciousness in the past is no grounds to reject the Macedonians as a nationality today."

== See also ==
- Samuil's Inscription
- History of Bulgaria
- Armenians in Bulgaria

== Literature ==
- Crampton, Richard. A Concise History of Bulgaria. (2005). Cambridge University Press. ISBN 0521850851
- Fine, J. The Early Medieval Balkans, A Critical Survey from the Sixth to the Late Twelfth Century (1991). University of Michigan Press. ISBN 0-472-08149-7
- Holmes, Catherine. Biography of Basil II with notes on Scylitzes by Catherine Holmes (2022). online
- Nicholas, Adontz (1965). "Samuel l'Arménien, roi des Bulgares". Études Arméno – byzantines. Lisbon. pp. 347–407.
- Lang, David M. The Bulgarians, London, 1976.
- Lang, David M. The Armenians. A People in Exile. London, 1981.
- Ostrogorsky, George, History of the Byzantine State. tr. (from the German) by Joan Hussey, rev. ed., Rutgers Univ. Press, 1969.
- Dimitry Obolensky, "The Bogomils: A study in Balkan Neo-Manicheism", Cambridge University Press 1948
- Greenwood, Tim (2017). The Universal History of Step'anos Tarōnec'i. Oxford University Press. ISBN 978-0198792512.
- Skylitzes, John. Ioannis Scylitzae Synopsis historiarum (1973). De Gruyter. ISBN 978-3110022858
- Stephenson, Paul. The Legend of Basil the Bulgar-Slayer (2010). Cambridge University Press. ISBN 0521770173
- Stephenson, Paul. Byzantium's Balkan Frontier: a Political Study of the Northern Balkans, 900–1204 (2000). Cambridge University Press. ISBN 0-521-77017-3
- Ziemann, Daniel (2016). Das Erste bulgarische Reich. Eine frühmittelalterliche Großmacht zwischen Byzanz und Abendland [The First Bulgarian Empire. An early medieval great power between Byzantium and the Occident] (PDF). Online handbook on the history of South-East Europe. Volume I: Rule and politics in Southeastern Europe until 1800 (in German). Regensburg: Institute for East and Southeast European Studies of the Leibniz Association.
