= Prespa =

Region in South-eastern Europe

Coordinates: 40.855222°N 20.982750°E

2009 topographic map of the Prespa region

Prespa (Macedonian: Преспа, Greek: Πρέσπα, Albanian: Prespë) is a region shared between North Macedonia, Greece and Albania. It shares the same name with the two Prespa lakes which are situated in the middle of the region. The largest town is Resen in North Macedonia with 9,000 inhabitants.

== History ==
In today's borders, the region is divided between three countries, which is result of the division of the Ottoman territories of Europe after the two Balkan Wars. Prespa itself has an important geostrategic position. During the Roman rule through Prespa, the famous ancient Roman road "Via Egnatia" was built. In addition to the road, several settlements were also built. In the 6th and 7th centuries, Slavic tribes did not settle permanently in Prespa. The Slavs skipped the region that had been already plundered and depopulated, but continued south to the Mediterranean coast.

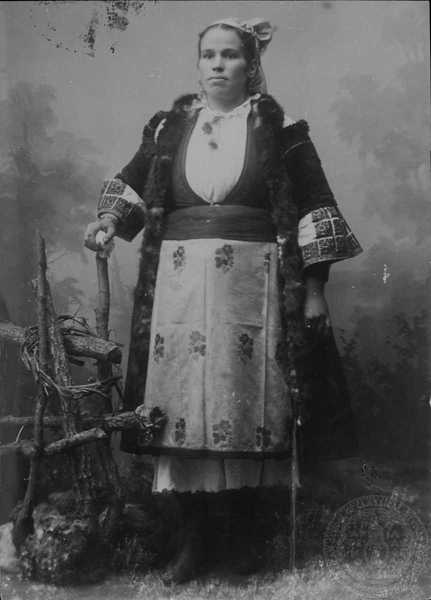
Woman from Jankovec in folk costume, Upper Prespa, beginning of 20th century.

In the late 10th and early 11th centuries, during the reign of the Cometopuls, besides Prespa Lake, the town of Prespa was also mentioned as the capital of the First Bulgarian Empire. This city was also the seat of the Bulgarian Patriarchate, whose seat was later transferred to Bulgarian Patriarchate of Ohrid.

During the year 1888, in the village of German, in Lower Prespa, the headstone of Samuel's parents was found, his father Nicholas, his mother Ripsimia and his brother David, dating from 993. It is one of the first written monuments in the Old Church Slavonic language. It is currently located in the National Archaeological Museum in Sofia, Bulgaria, most probably portrayed in the wake of the wars. From that period on, the island of Achilles, in the small Prespa Lake, there are still remains of the Cathedral church erected by Samuel in honor of St. Achilles.

In the village Kurbinovo, St. George's Church has a remarkable fresco painting of 1191. It is a notable example of medieval painting located within North Macedonia.

== See also ==
- Lake Prespa
- Resen Municipality, a municipality on North Macedonia's side of the Prespa Lakes
- Prespa (medieval town)
- Prespes, a municipality on Greece's side of the Prespa Lakes
- Pustec (municipality), a municipality on Albania's side of the Prespa Lakes (also an ethnic Macedonian minority zone)
