= Boris II of Bulgaria =

Tsar of Bulgaria from 969 to 977

Boris II
- Emperor of Bulgaria
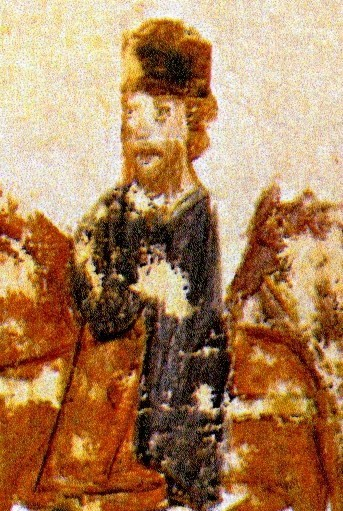
- Reign: 969–971
- Predecessor: Peter I
- Successor: Roman
- Born: c. 931
- Died: 977
- Issue: Maria; Two daughters
- House: Krum's dynasty
- Father: Peter I
- Mother: Irene Lekapene

Boris II (Church Slavonic: Борисъ В҃; Bulgarian: Борис II; c. 931 – 977) was the emperor (tsar) of Bulgaria from 969 to 977 (in Byzantine captivity from 971).

== Life ==
Boris II was the eldest surviving son of Emperor Peter I of Bulgaria and Maria (renamed Eirene) Lekapena, a granddaughter of Emperor Romanos I Lekapenos of Byzantium. Boris had been born by 931, when he had visited Constantinople together with his mother.

Nothing else is known of Boris II's life until 968, when he went to Constantinople again to negotiate a peace settlement with Emperor Nikephoros II Phokas, and apparently to serve as an honorary hostage. This arrangement was intended to put an end to the conflict between Bulgaria and Byzantium, who would now join forces against Prince Sviatoslav I of Kiev, whom the Byzantine emperor had pitted against the Bulgarians. In 969 a new Kievan invasion defeated the Bulgarians again and Peter I abdicated to become a monk. In circumstances that are not entirely clear, Boris II was allowed to return to Bulgaria and sit on his father's throne. (The later Byzantine chronicle of John Skylitzes confounds this with a later event, in which Boris and his brother escaped Constantinople after the so-called rebellion of the Kometopouloi in Macedonia.)

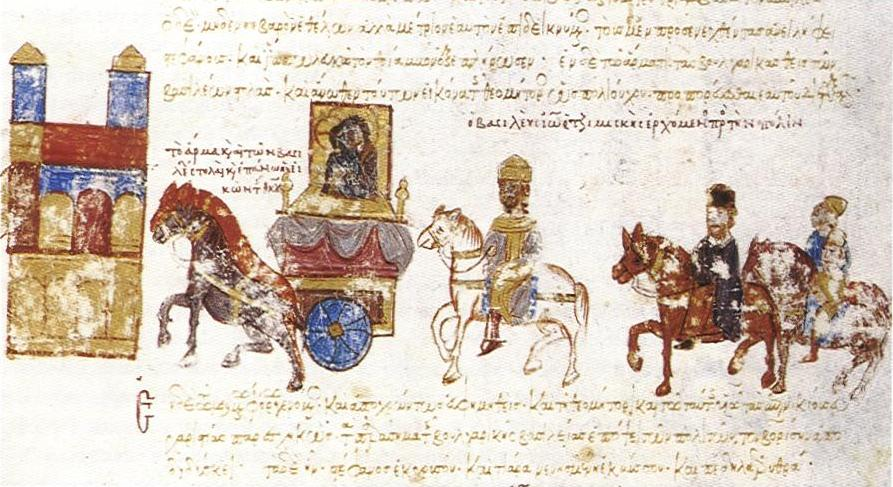
The Byzantine emperor John Tzimisces returns in triumph in Constantinople with the captured Boris II and Preslav Icon

Boris II was unable to stem the Kievan advance, and found himself forced to accept Sviatoslav of Kiev as his ally and puppet-master, turning against the Byzantines. A Kievan campaign into Byzantine Thrace was defeated at the Battle of Arkadioupolis in 970, and the new Byzantine Emperor John I Tzimiskes advanced northwards. Failing to secure the defense of the Balkan passes, Sviatoslav allowed the Byzantines to penetrate into Moesia and lay siege to the Bulgarian capital Preslav. Although Bulgarians and Ruses joined in defending the city, the Byzantines managed to set afire the wooden structures and roofs by missiles, and took the fortress. Boris II now became a captive of John I Tzimiskes, who continued to pursue the Kievan Army, besieging Sviatoslav in Drăstăr (Silistra), while claiming to act as Boris's ally and protector, and treating the Bulgarian monarch with due respect. After Sviatoslav had come to terms and set out for Kiev, the Byzantine emperor returned to Constantinople in triumph. Far from liberating Bulgaria as he had claimed, John brought along Boris II and his family, together with the contents of the Bulgarian imperial treasury in 971. In a public ceremony in Constantinople, Boris II was ritually divested of his imperial insignia and was given the Byzantine court title of magistros as compensation. The Bulgarian lands in Thrace and lower Moesia now became part of the Byzantine Empire and were placed under Byzantine governors.

Although the ceremony in 971 had been intended as a symbolic termination of the Bulgarian empire, the Byzantines were unable to assert their control over the western provinces of Bulgaria. These remained under the rule of their own governors, and especially of a noble family led by four brothers called the Kometopouloi (i.e., "the sons of the Count"), named David, Moses, Aron, and Samuel. The movement was regarded as a "revolt" by the Byzantine emperor, but it apparently saw itself as a sort of regency for the captive Boris II. As they began to raid neighboring territories under Byzantine rule, the Byzantine government resorted to a stratagem intended to compromise the leadership of this "revolt". This involved allowing Boris II and his brother Roman to escape from their honorary captivity at the Byzantine court, in the hope that their arrival in Bulgaria would cause a division between the Kometopouloi and other Bulgarian leaders. As Boris II and Roman entered the region under Bulgarian control in 977, Boris II dismounted and went ahead of his brother. Mistaken for a Byzantine notable due to his attire, Boris was shot in the chest by a deaf and mute border patrol. Roman managed to identify himself to the other guards and was duly accepted as emperor.

== Family ==
By his marriage to an unknown woman, possibly a Byzantine noblewoman, Boris II had several children, as the Byzantine historian Kedrenus refers to Emperor John I Tzimisces finding "cum coniuge et liberis Borises Bulgarorum rex" among the Russian prisoners when he invaded Bulgaria. His children may include:

- Maria, wife believed in the late 10th century of Tsar Ivan Vladislav of Bulgaria; this descent has been proposed by Christian Settipani based on prosopographical and onomastic elements which appear to link Maria to the Krum dynasty.
- An unnamed daughter, engaged to the Byzantine Emperor Basil II in 968
- An unnamed daughter, engaged to the Byzantine Emperor Constantine VIII in 968

Preceded by Peter I	Emperor of Bulgaria; 969–977	Succeeded by Roman
