= Samuil's Inscription =

992/3 CE inscription in Bulgaria

Samuil's inscription
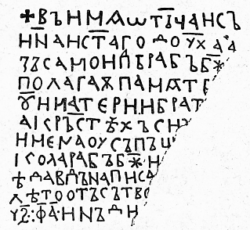
- Samuil's inscription
- Material: Marble
- Writing: Old Slavonic
- Created: 992/3 CE
- Discovered: Agios Germanos (now West Macedonia, Greece)
- Present location: National Historical Museum, Bulgaria
- Culture: First Bulgarian Empire

Samuil's Inscription is a medieval text that was found on the tombstone of Samuel of Bulgaria's parents, erected in 992/3 CE. One of the oldest preserved Cyrillic Slavic inscriptions, it was made in the First Bulgarian Empire by the order of Tsar Samuel. The text mentions the names of Samuel's parents as well as of his brother David.

The inscription was discovered in 1888 in the village of German, near Lake Prespa, now Greece, during the construction of the new church of the village. In 1916, it was taken by Bulgarian occupation authorities to Bulgaria, where it is currently stored at the National Historical Museum in Sofia. Its original location is thought to have been in the town of Prespa on the island of St. Achilles, from where it was subsequently transferred to the old church of German, which dates back to 1006. The dimensions of the tombstone are 125–130 cm high, 52–67 cm wide, and 7–10 cm thick.

== Inscription ==
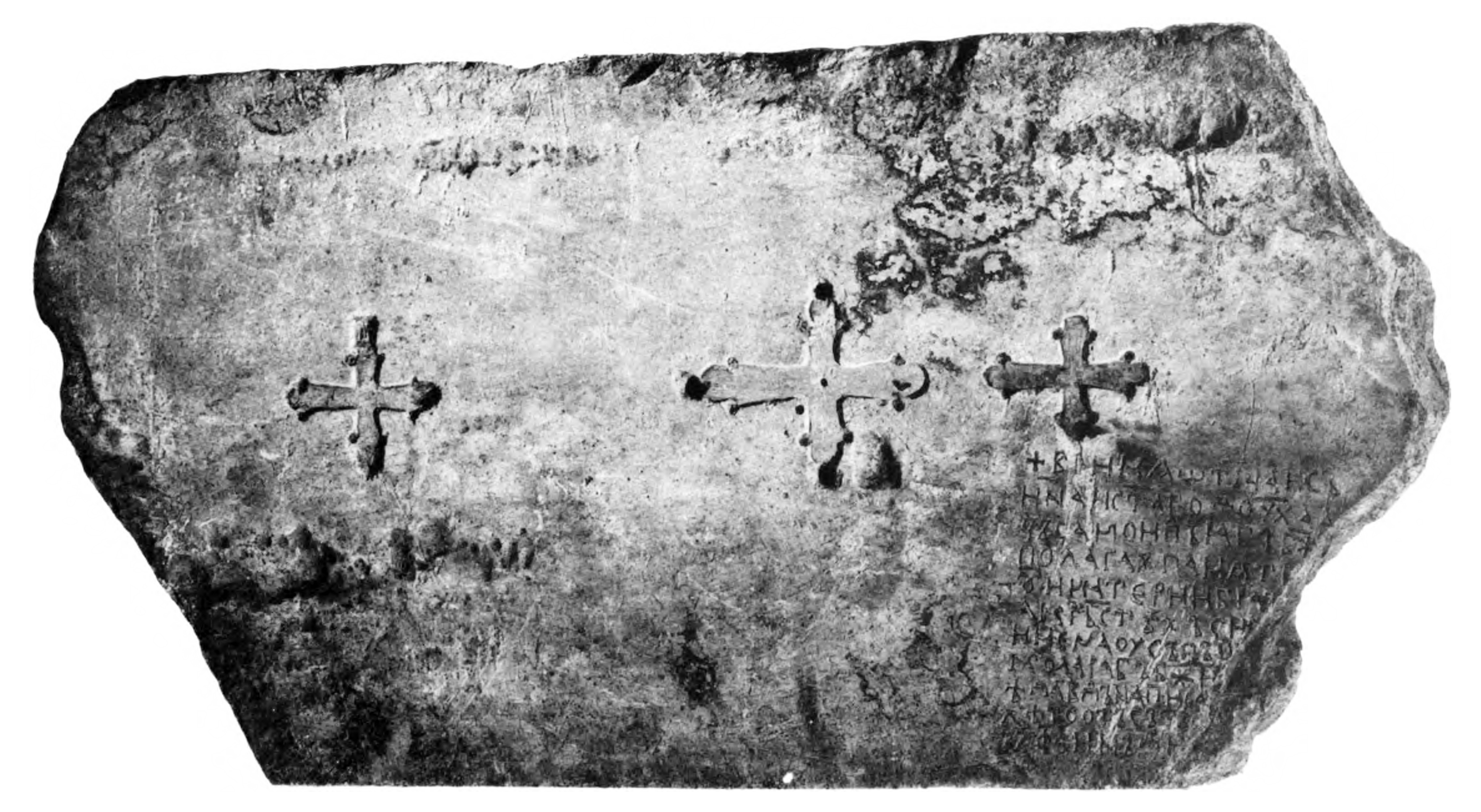
A 19th-century photograph of the original tombstone. The inscription is in the lower right angle

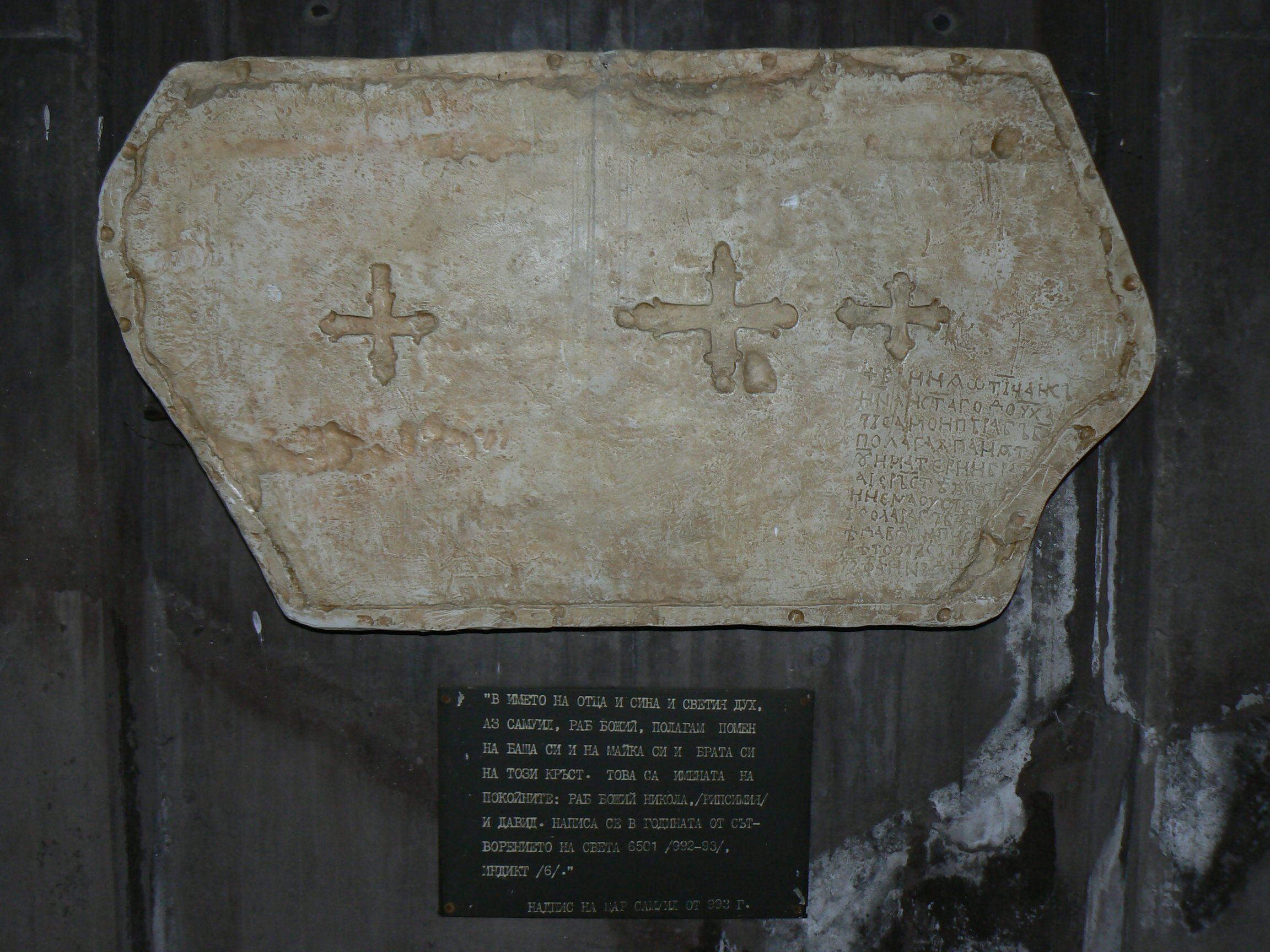
A modern replica of the tombstone in Bulgaria

Original text with reconstructed parts in square brackets and modern-style spaces, capital letters and punctuation (hyphens, commas, two dots and a colon) added:

✚ Въ имѧ Ѡт͠ьца и Съ-
и͠на и Ст҃аго Доу͠ха, а-
зъ, Самоипⷧь, рабъ Б͠ж[и,]
полагаѫ памѧть [ѡц]
ꙋ҃ и матєри и брат[оу н-]
а кръ͠стѣхъ сих[ъ. Се]
имена оусъпъш[ихъ: Ни-]
кола рабъ Бж҃и, [Риѱими-]
ѣ, Давдъ. Написа[но се въ]
лѣто отъ сътво[рениѣ миро-]
у ҂ꙅ҃⁖ф҃а҃· инъди[кта ꙅ҃]

The following is the French translation of the inscription by Adontz:

Au nom du Père et du Fils et du Saint-Esprit, moi, Samuel, serviteur de Dieu, je fais mémoire de mon père, de ma mère et de mon frère sur ces croix. Voici les noms des défunts: Nicolas, serviteur de Dieu; Ripsimé et David. Écrit en l'an de la création 6501, indiction VI.

In English, translated from the French:

In the name of the Father and the Son and the Holy Spirit, I, Samuel, servant of God, made a memory of my father, of my mother and of my brother on these crosses. Here are the names of the deceased: Nikolas, servant of God, Ripsimia and David. Written in the year 6501 since Creation, VI indiction.

The year 6501 since the creation of the world corresponds to 992-993 CE.

== See also ==
- Comitopuli dynasty
- Bitola Inscription
- History of Bulgaria
- History of the Republic of Macedonia

== Literature ==
- Birnbaum, Henrik; Puhvel, Jaan (1966). Ancient Indo-European Dialects: Proceedings of the Conference on Indo-European Linguistics Held at the University of California, Los Angeles April 25–27, 1963. Univ of California Press.
- Üre, Pinar (2020). Reclaiming Byzantium: Russia, Turkey and the Archaeological Claim to the Middle East in the 19th Century. Bloomsbury Publishing. ISBN 978-1-78831-745-0.
- Curta, Florin (2019). Eastern Europe in the Middle Ages (500-1300). Brill. ISBN 9789004395190.
- Zaimova, Vasilika (2018). Bulgarians by Birth, The Comitopuls, Emperor Samuel and Their Successors According to Historical Sources and the Historiographic Tradition. Brill. ISBN 9789004352995.
- Успенскiй, Ф. И. ( Uspenskiĭ, Fedor I., 1845-1928) Надпись царя Самуила, Известия Русского Археологического Института в Константинополе, 1899, IV, с. 1 - 4.
- Иванов, Йор. (Ivanov, Ĭor.) Български старини из Македония. София, 1931, с. 25.
- Ivanov, Ĭordan (1872-1947). Bŭlgarski starini na Makedoniia, 1970.
- Кос, М. (Kos, Milko) О натпису цара Самуила, Гласник српског научног друштва 5, 1929, с. 203 - 209.
- Степанос Таронеци-Асохик (Asoghik, Stepanos T., 10th - 11th c.). Всеобщая история Степаноса Таронского - Асохика по прoзванию, писателя ХІ столетия. Перевод с армянскoго и объяснения Н.Эминым. Москва, Типография Лазаревского института восточных языков. 1864. XVIII, 335 стр.
- Asoghik (Stepanos de Taron). L'histoire universelle, Paris, 1859. Translation in German, Leipzig, 1907.
- Stepanos, Tarōnetsi (Stepanos Asoghik Taronetsi, 10th-11th c.) Tiezerakan patmutyun, Erevan, 2000, Pp. 455 (303 - 304).
- Adontz, Nikoghayos. Samuel l'Armenien, Roi des Bulgares. Bruxelles, Palais des academies, 1938, Pp. 63.
- Adontz, Nicolas. Etudes Armeno-Byzantines. Livraria Bertrand. Lisbonne, 1965, pp. 347–407 (384).
- Lang, David M. The Bulgarians, London, 1976.
- Lang, David M. The Armenians. A People in Exile. London, 1981, Pp. 203 (55, 105).
