= Aron of Bulgaria =

Bulgarian noble (died 987)

Aron (Bulgarian: Арон; died in 987/988 or 976) was a Bulgarian noble, brother of Emperor Samuel of Bulgaria and third son of komes Nicholas. After the fall of the eastern parts of the country under Byzantine occupation in 971, he and his three brothers David, Moses and Samuel continued the resistance to the west. They were called Cometopuli and ruled the country together, as the rightful heirs to the throne, Boris II and Roman were imprisoned in Constantinople. The residence of Aron was Serdica (modern-day Sofia), situated on the main road between Constantinople and Western Europe. He had to defend the area from enemy invasions and attack the Byzantine territories in Thrace.

== Treason and death ==
In the beginning of the major campaign against the Byzantine Empire in 976, the two eldest brothers David and Moses perished but the Bulgarians achieved great successes including the return of north-eastern Bulgaria. During that time, the Byzantine Emperor Basil II had to fight both the Bulgarians and the dangerous rebellion under Bardas Skleros and he turned the customary means of the Byzantine policy: conspiracy.

His attention concentrated on Aron, who was more dangerous at the time due to the proximity of his seat to Thrace; and because of his ambition to rule over Bulgaria alone which made an eventual peace profitable for both Aron and Basil. The Bulgarian noble asked for the Emperor's sister's hand and Basil agreed but he tried to deceive Aron and sent him the wife of one of his nobles and the bishop of Sebasteia. However, the attempted deceit was revealed and the bishop was killed, but the negotiations continued nonetheless. In the end Samuel learned of the secret negotiations and on 14 June 976 or 987/988 Aron together with all of his kin were executed in the vicinity of present-day Dupnitsa. Only his eldest son Ivan Vladislav was spared due to the intervention of Samuel's son Gavril Radomir. Ivan Vladislav murdered his saviour 39 years later to avenge the death of his innocent siblings, thus usurping the throne and becoming Emperor of Bulgaria.

== Family tree ==
komes Nicholas	Ripsimia of Armenia
Aron	Moses	David	Samuel of Bulgaria	Agatha
Ivan Vladislav	Maria	Theodora Kosara	Miroslava	Gavril; Radomir

== Another theory ==
However, there's also another version about Aron's origin. According to this version, Simeon I of Bulgaria had several children. One of them was Ivan who married to an Armenian in Caesarea; Aron and his brother Moses were Ivan’s sons.
