= Moses of Bulgaria =

Moses (Church Slavonic: Мѡѷсе́й Bulgarian: Мойсей; died c. 976/986) was a Bulgarian noble, brother of Emperor Samuel of Bulgaria and second son of komes Nicholas. After the fall of the eastern parts of the Empire under Byzantine occupation in 971, he and his brothers David, Aron and Samuel continued the fight to the west. They ruled together and divided the realm into four parts. His lands were centred on Strumitsa, from where he had to launch attacks against the Aegean regions of the Byzantine Empire.

In 976, the Bulgarian armies undertook a major assault from all borders and Moses lead his troops to Serres. During the siege of the town, he was mortally hit by a stone and then slain by an enemy sword. David and Aron also perished in the same year and the whole power fell in the hands of Samuel, who became Emperor in 997 after the death of last ruler from the previous dynasty, Roman.

== Family tree ==
komes Nicholas	Ripsimia of Armenia
David	Moses	Aron	Samuel of Bulgaria
Ivan Vladislav	Gavril Radomir

== Another theory ==
However, there is also another version about Moses's origin. According to this version, Simeon I of Bulgaria had several children. One of them was Ivan who married to an Armenian in Caesarea. Moses and his brother Aaron were Ivan’s sons. According to this version, Moses survived and remained in action next to Samuel against the enemy at least until 986.
