= Nicholas (komes) =

Bulgarian noble

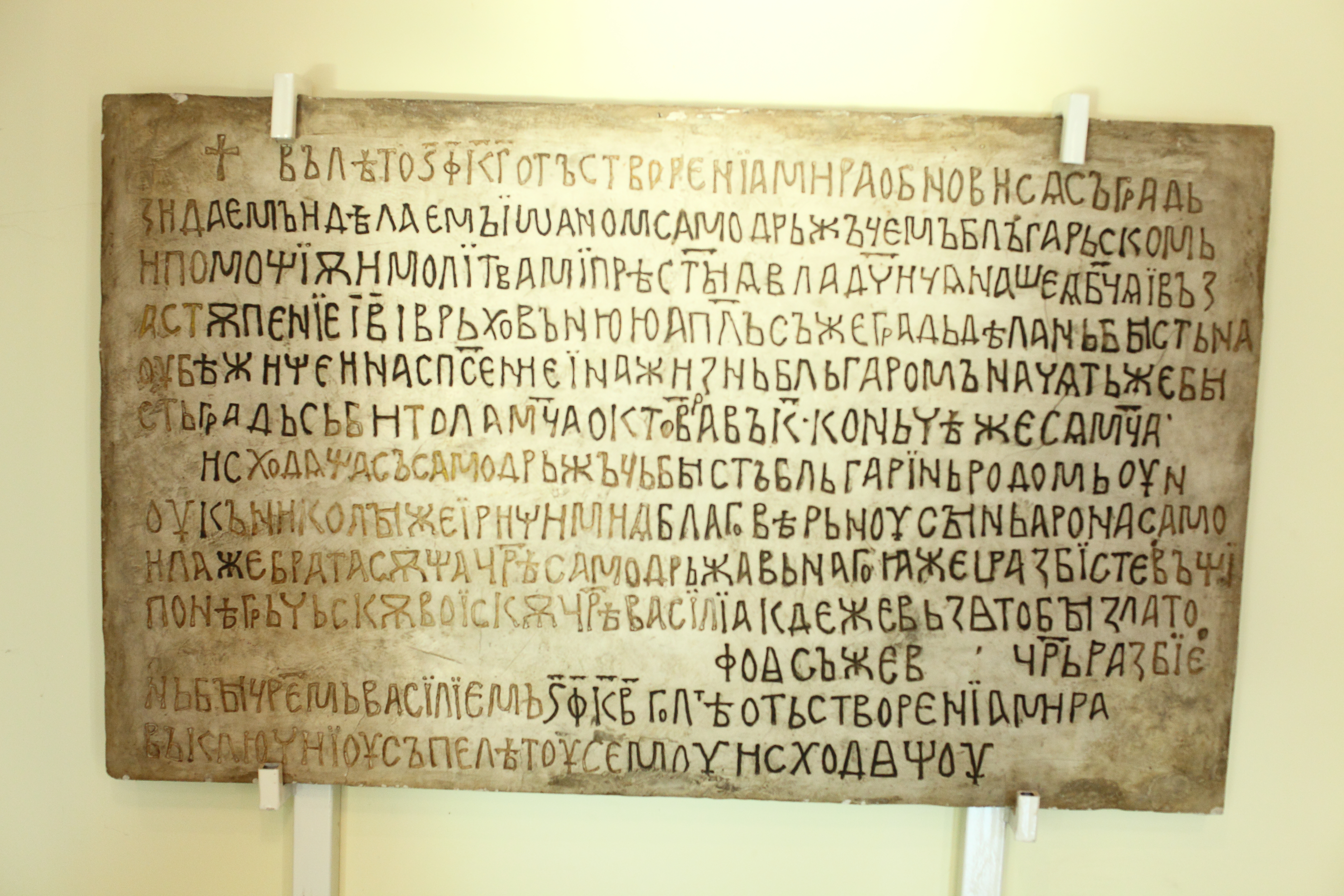
Inscription in the National Historical Museum of Bulgaria citing Nicholas and Ripsime as grandparents of Ivan Vladislav, the son of Aron.

Nicholas (Bulgarian: Никола, romanized: Nikola) was a local ruler (komes) in Bulgaria, and progenitor of the Cometopuli ("the sons of the count") dynasty.

According to the Armenian chronicler Stephen of Taron, the family originated in the Armenian region of Derdjan, where their sons were born. However, Michael Palairet affirms that count Nicholas' family name is Shishman, a family name not of Armenian origin, which centuries later became a Bulgarian royal dynasty. He was married to Ripsime or Hripsime; the couple had four sons, David, Moses, Aron, and Samuel, who are collectively known as the Cometopuli (from Greek Kometopouloi, "sons of the komes"; Armenian կոմսաձագ Komsajagk). Sometime in the 970s—the exact date is unclear and disputed—the brothers launched a successful rebellion against the Byzantine Empire, that had recently subdued Bulgaria; after the early death of his brothers, Samuel remained as the undisputed leader of Bulgaria, ruling as Tsar from 996 until his death in 1014.

Other than that, nothing is known of Nicholas. He may have ruled Serdica or, according to other sources, was a local count in the region of the modern North Macedonia. The family appanage was located above the village of Palatovo, according to legend and a number of archeological data in the neighborhood.

In 992/3, Samuel erected at German, near Lake Prespa, an inscription commemorating his parents and his brother David.

== Family tree ==
Count; Nicholas	Ripsimia of Armenia
David	Moses	Aron	Samuel of Bulgaria
Ivan Vladislav of Bulgaria	Gavril Radomir of Bulgaria

== Sources ==
- Kazhdan, Alexander, ed. (1991). The Oxford Dictionary of Byzantium. Oxford University Press. ISBN 978-0-19-504652-6.
- Lilie, Ralph-Johannes; Ludwig, Claudia; Zielke, Beate; Pratsch, Thomas, eds. (2013). Prosopographie der mittelbyzantinischen Zeit Online. Berlin-Brandenburgische Akademie der Wissenschaften. Nach Vorarbeiten F. Winkelmanns erstellt (in German). De Gruyter.
