= David of Bulgaria =

Bulgarian noble (died 976)

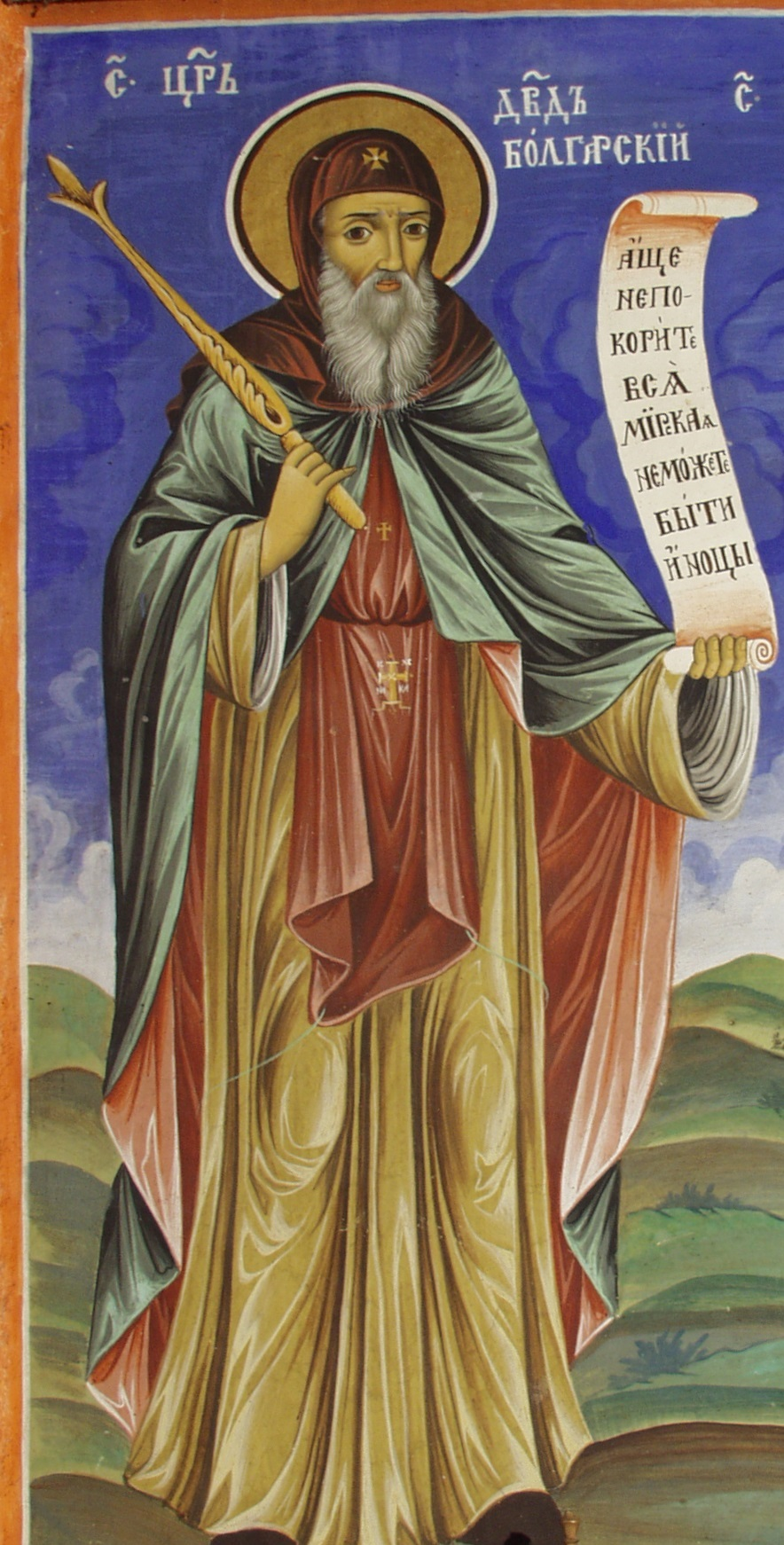
Archangels Chapel in Rila Monastery David of Bulgaria - 1845.

David (Church Slavonic: Даві́дъ Bulgarian: Давид; died 976) was a Bulgarian noble, brother of Emperor Samuel and eldest son of komes Nicholas, member of the Cometopuli dynasty. After the disastrous invasion of Rus' armies and the fall of North-eastern Bulgaria under Byzantine occupation in 971, he and his three younger brothers took the lead of the defence of the country. They executed their power together and each of them governed and defended a separate region. He ruled the southernmost parts of the realm from Prespa and Kastoria and was responsible for the defence the dangerous borders with Thessalonica and Thessaly. In 976 he participated in the major assault against the Byzantine Empire but was killed by vagrant Vlachs between Prespa and Kostur.

== Family tree ==
komes Nicholas	Ripsimia of Armenia
David	Moses	Aron	Samuel of Bulgaria
Ivan Vladislav	Gavril Radomir
