= Roman of Bulgaria =

Tsar of Bulgaria from 977 to 991

Roman
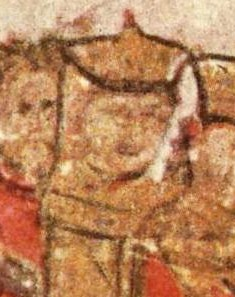
- Detail of a miniature from a copy of the Synopsis Chronike by Constantine Manasses, 14th century

Emperor of Bulgaria
- Reign: 977–991/997 (Note: Captured by the Byzantine Empire in 991, but still claimed the title until his death in 997.)
- Predecessor: Boris II
- Successor: Samuel
- Born: early 930s
- Died: 997; Constantinople
- House: Krum's dynasty
- Father: Peter I of Bulgaria
- Mother: Irene Lekapene

Roman (Bulgarian: Роман; 930s–997) was the emperor (tsar) of Bulgaria from 977 to 991, being in Byzantine captivity thereafter still claiming the title.

== Reign ==
Roman was the second surviving son of Emperor Peter I of Bulgaria by his marriage with Maria (renamed Eirene) Lekapene, the granddaughter of the Byzantine Emperor Romanos I Lekapenos, whose name he was given. It is possible that he had the double name Roman-Simeon, but this may be due to confusion with another man in the sources. He was born around 930, and had probably visited Constantinople with his mother and older brothers soon after 931.

We know nothing about Roman’s life until 968, when he joined his older brother Boris in Constantinople to negotiate a peace agreement between Bulgaria and Byzantium, during which they apparently served as honorary hostages at the Byzantine court. On their father’s abdication in 969, Boris and Roman returned to Bulgaria, where Boris II succeeded as emperor. Roman may have been proclaimed co-emperor in accordance with Byzantine usage, but the evidence for that is vague.

In Bulgaria Roman probably shared his brother’s destiny, becoming first a pawn in the hands of Prince Sviatoslav I of Kiev and then in those of the Byzantine Emperor John I Tzimiskes. After the latter’s victory in 971, Roman was taken to Constantinople together with his brother’s family. To ensure that the Bulgarian dynasty would die out (Boris II apparently had only daughters), the Byzantine emperor had Roman castrated. Boris and Roman remained in honorary captivity at the imperial palace until after the death of the emperor in 976.

At this point the raids of the Cometopuli into Byzantine possessions in Macedonia led to a Byzantine stratagem intended to divide the leadership of the still-unconquered Bulgarian lands in the west. Temporarily jailed, Boris and Roman were allowed to escape in 977. During their attempt to cross the Bulgarian border, Boris II was taken for an enemy and killed by a guard. Roman managed to identify himself to the Bulgarian patrols, and was duly recognized by the Bulgarians as emperor.

Although Roman was acknowledged as the official Bulgarian ruler, most of the military matters were left in the hands of Samuil, who was the youngest brother of the Cometopuli dynasty, and Roman devoted the end of his life to church deeds, much as his father Peter had. During one of his invasions of Bulgaria, the Byzantine Emperor Basil II succeeded in capturing Roman in 991. Roman remained in Byzantine captivity until his death in 997, and it was only then that Samuel took the Bulgarian imperial title. Such, at least, is the sequence of events reported by the trustworthy historian Yahya of Antioch.

According to the later testimony of the Byzantine chronicler John Skylitzes, in 1004 Skopje was surrendered to Basil II by its governor Roman Simeon, who may have been mistaken for Emperor Roman in the text. Roman-Simeon received the title of patrikios and was named military governor or strategos of the theme of Abydos.

== Sources ==
- Fine, John V. A. Jr. (1991) [1983]. The Early Medieval Balkans: A Critical Survey from the Sixth to the Late Twelfth Century. Ann Arbor: University of Michigan Press. ISBN 0-472-08149-7.
- Jordan Andreev, Ivan Lazarov, Plamen Pavlov, Кой кой е в средновековна България, Sofia 1999.
- (primary source) John Skylitzes II, 455, 13
- Tougher, Shaun (2008). The Eunuch in Byzantine History and Society. Routledge.
- Pavlov, P. Boris i Roman (bulg.)

| Preceded by Boris II | Emperor of Bulgaria; 977–991 | Succeeded by Samuel |
