= Ashot Taronites =

Byzantine nobleman

- Ashot and his wife Miroslava, from the Madrid Skylitzes

Magistros
- Monarchs: Basil II & Constantine VIII

Personal details
- Born: c. 970
- Spouse: Miroslava of Bulgaria
- Parent: Gregory Taronites

Military service
- Allegiance: Byzantine empire Bulgarian empire
- Battles/wars: Byzantine–Bulgarian wars

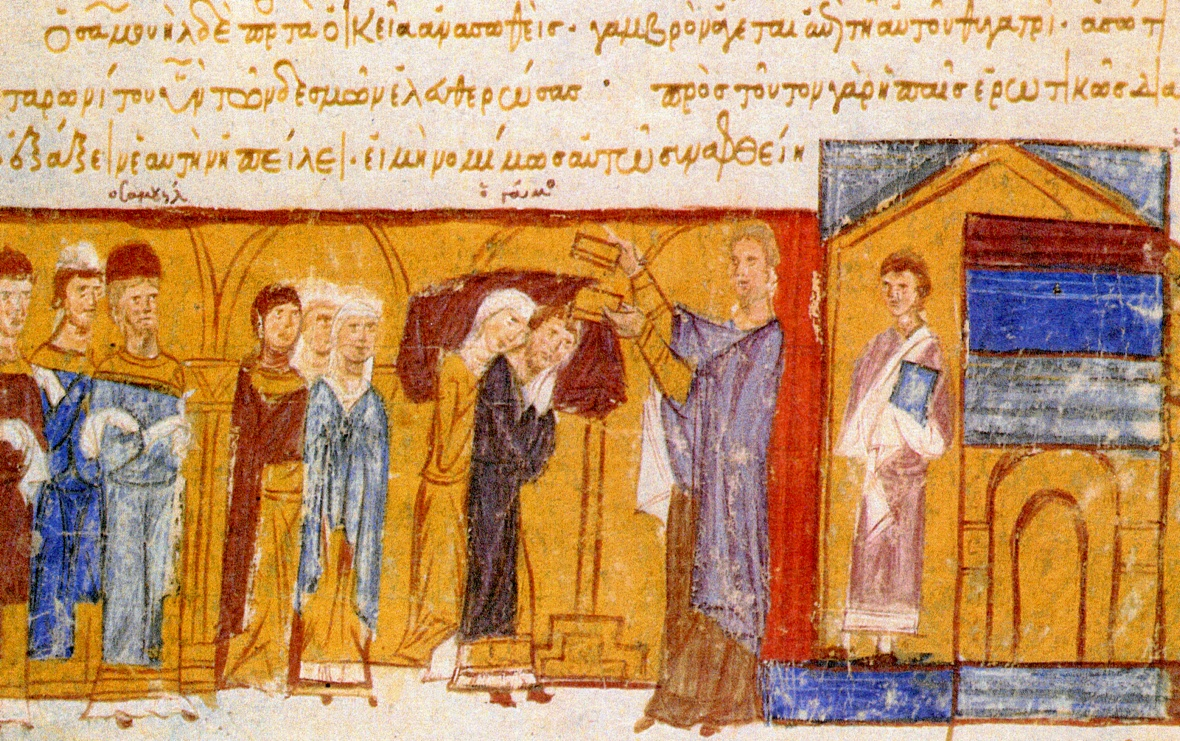
The wedding of Ashot and Miroslava, from the Madrid Skylitzes manuscript

Ashot Taronites (Greek: Ἀσώτιος Ταρωνίτης, romanized: Asōtios Tarōnitēs; Armenian: Աշոտ Տարոնիտես, romanized: Ašot Taronites; fl. c. 995 – c. 997/8) was a Byzantine nobleman. Captured by the Bulgarians in 995, he was released in 996 and married to Miroslava, daughter of Tsar Samuel of Bulgaria. Appointed governor of Dyrrhachium by Samuel, he and his wife fled to Constantinople and arranged for Dyrrhachium to be handed over to Byzantine rule.

== Life ==
Ashot was the son of Gregory Taronites. Gregory was an Armenian prince of the region of Taron in southern Armenia. When his father, Ashot III of Taron, died in 967/8, Gregory and his brother ceded Taron to the Byzantine Empire in exchange for extensive lands and the title of patrikios. Gregory went to Constantinople, where he married and had at least two children, Ashot and a daughter Irene.

In 991, Emperor Basil II led a campaign in the Balkans, against Samuel of Bulgaria, and appointed Gregory doux of Thessalonica. Ashot accompanied his father to Thessalonica. Some time after this appointment, Ashot was captured and Gregory was killed by the Bulgarians in an ambush near Thessalonica. A raiding party had approached the city, and Gregory sent out Ashot with the vanguard to make contact with them and reconnoitre. The over-eager Ashot engaged the Bulgarians and drove them back, but was drawn into a prepared ambush and encircled with his men. His father, following up with the main Byzantine force, rushed to his rescue, but was killed. The exact date of this event is unknown. The chronology of the account of John Skylitzes seems to place it in 996, while Armenian sources place it in 991. Modern research holds that it must have happened at the latest in mid-995, as John Chaldos is attested as doux of Thessalonica later in the same year.

In 996, however, Samuel, following his escape from the disastrous Battle of Spercheios, released Ashot and married him to his daughter Miroslava. According to the Byzantine historian John Skylitzes, the latter had fallen deeply in love with the captive Byzantine, and threatened to kill herself if Samuel did not allow them to be married. Samuel sent the couple to Dyrrhachium, where Ashot became governor. Once there, Ashot established contacts with the Byzantine government, aided by the city's leading magnate, John Chryselios, who offered to surrender the city in exchange for titles for himself and his sons. Ashot and Miroslava fled to Constantinople on board a Byzantine warship, and soon after, a Byzantine squadron appeared off Dyrrhachium under Eustathios Daphnomeles, and the city returned to Byzantine rule. At Constantinople, Emperor Basil named Ashot magistros and his wife a zoste patrikia. Nothing further is known of them. The dating of this episode is unclear; it is usually dated shortly after 997/8 according to the narrative of Skylitzes. It is, however, possible that this episode actually took place as late as 1018, at the end of the Bulgarian war, since the chronology of Skylitzes is often unreliable; while the Italian chronicle of Lupus Protospatharius gives a completely different date for the recovery of Dyrrhachium, 1004/5, and does not mention Ashot.

== Sources ==
- Holmes, Catherine (2005). Basil II and the Governance of Empire (976–1025). Oxford: Oxford University Press. ISBN 978-0-19-927968-5.
- Kazhdan, Alexander (1991). "Taronites". In Kazhdan, Alexander (ed.). The Oxford Dictionary of Byzantium. Oxford and New York: Oxford University Press. pp. 2012–2013. ISBN 0-19-504652-8.
- Lilie, Ralph-Johannes; Ludwig, Claudia; Pratsch, Thomas; Zielke, Beate (2013). Prosopographie der mittelbyzantinischen Zeit Online. Berlin-Brandenburgische Akademie der Wissenschaften. Nach Vorarbeiten F. Winkelmanns erstellt (in German). Berlin and Boston: De Gruyter.
- Stephenson, Paul (2003). The Legend of Basil the Bulgar-Slayer. Cambridge: Cambridge University Press. ISBN 978-0-521-81530-7.
- Strässle, Paul Meinrad (2006). Krieg und Kriegführung in Byzanz: die Kriege Kaiser Basileios' II. gegen die Bulgaren (976–1019) (in German). Cologne: Böhlau Verlag. ISBN 3-412-17405-X.
