= John Taronites =

John Taronites (Greek: Ἰωάννης Ταρωνίτης; born c. 1067) was a Byzantine aristocrat who served as provincial governor in the Balkans under his uncle, Emperor Alexios I Komnenos.

== Biography ==
His father, the panhypersebastos Michael Taronites, belonged to the aristocratic family of the Taronitai, a clan of princely Armenian origin from Taron. In ca. 1061–1063 he married Maria Komnene, the oldest daughter of the megas domestikos John Komnenos and Anna Dalassene, and oldest sister of Alexios I Komnenos (r. 1081–1118). John was the couple's oldest son, and was probably born in ca. 1067.

At some unknown date, probably ca. 1092/93, Taronites was military governor (doux) of Skopje, as indicated by his correspondence with Theophylact of Ohrid. In summer 1094 his father was dismissed and banished for his involvement in the conspiracy of Nikephoros Diogenes against Emperor Alexios, but the affair does not appear to have affected Taronites' standing and career. In autumn of that year, when Alexios campaigned against the Cumans in Thrace, he was entrusted the defence of Berroe and its environs along with Nikephoros Melissenos and George Palaiologos. In 1094/95, he participated in the synod at Blachernae Palace, where Leo of Chalcedon was condemned. He appears in the list of attendees with the high title of sebastos, in fifth place overall.

Taronites' next appears in a document of 1102 holding the position of civil governor (praetor) and head fiscal official (anagrapheus) of the combined themes of Thrace, Macedonia, Boleron, Strymon, and Thessalonica.

In 1104 his paternal cousin, Gregory Taronites, governor of Chaldia, rebelled against Alexios at Trebizond. The emperor sent many letters to persuade Gregory to submit, but the latter replied with insults, so in 1105/6 Alexios sent John at the head of an army to deal with him. Learning of this, Gregory marched inland to Koloneia, from where he intended to conclude an alliance with the Danishmends of Sebasteia. Taronites sent his Frankish mercenaries against the rebel, and managed to capture him before he reached the city. he brought his cousin captive back to Constantinople. There Alexios at first intended to have Gregory blinded—the customary punishment for rebellion—but was dissuaded by John, who pleaded for clemency for his cousin. Instead, Gregory's hair and beard were shaved, and he was paraded around the streets of Constantinople before being thrown into the Prison of Anemas.

He disappears from the sources after that, but it is possible that he may be identical to the John Taronites, pansebastos sebastos, dikaiodotes, and Eparch of the City, who attended a synod in 1147. It is unknown whether he was married or if he had children.

== Sources ==
- Kazhdan, Alexander, ed. (1991). The Oxford Dictionary of Byzantium. Oxford and New York: Oxford University Press. ISBN 0-19-504652-8.}
- Skoulatos, Basile (1980). Les personnages byzantins de l'Alexiade: Analyse prosopographique et synthèse [The Byzantine Personalities of the Alexiad: Prosopographical Analysis and Synthesis] (in French). Louvain-la-Neuve and Louvain: Bureau du Recueil Collège Érasme and Éditions Nauwelaerts.
- Varzos, Konstantinos (1984). Η Γενεαλογία των Κομνηνών [The Genealogy of the Komnenoi] (PDF) (in Greek). Vol. A1. Thessaloniki: Centre for Byzantine Studies, University of Thessaloniki.
