= Battle of Thessalonica (995) =

Byzantine-Bulgarian battle in Greece before or during 995

Coordinates: 40°39′N 22°54′E

- Part of the Byzantine–Bulgarian wars
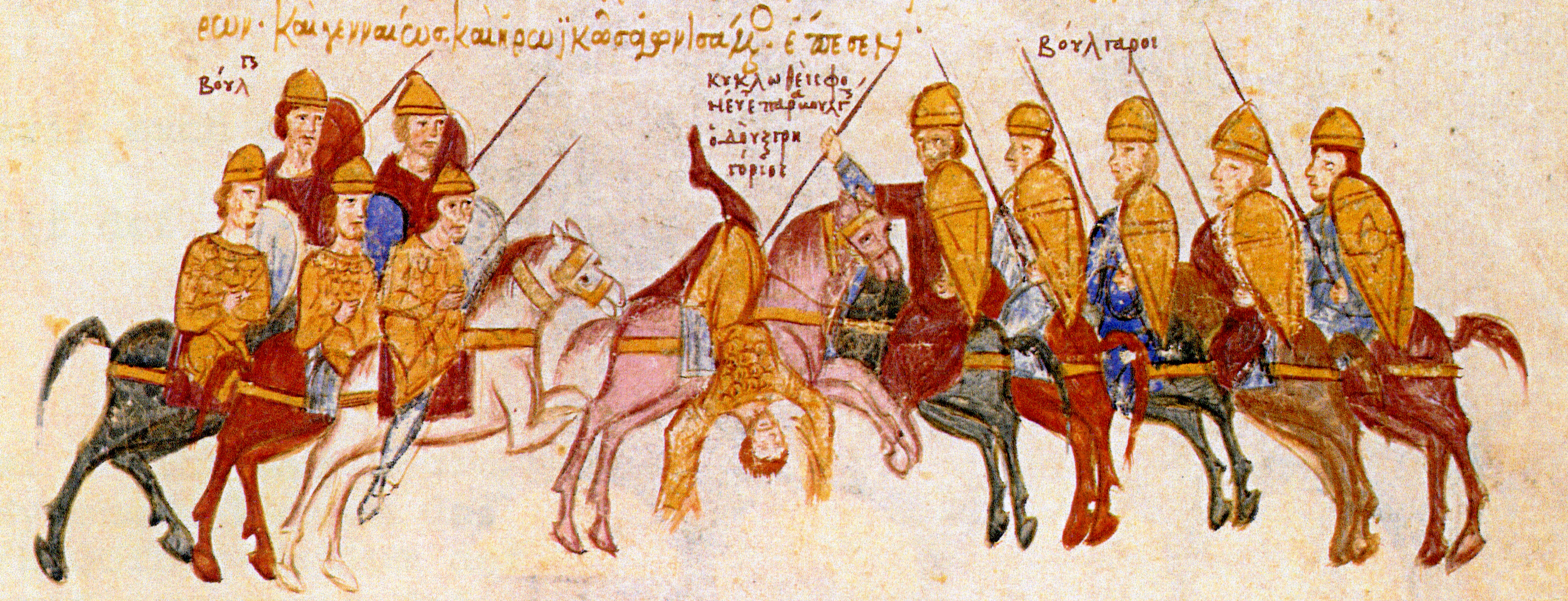
- Byzantine drawing depicting the ambush and death of Gregorios Taronites by the Bulgarians, as depicted in the Madrid Skylitzes
Date	995 or earlier (Note: The exact date of this campaign and the subsequent battle is unclear. An Armenian source puts it as early as 991, while the account of John Skylitzes, on which the dating by traditional accounts relies, implies that it happened in 996. However, as John Chaldos is attested as doux in Thessalonica in 995/6 in succession to Taronites, the campaign must have happened at the latest in 995, if not some time before.)
Location	Near Thessalonica, Greece
Result	Bulgarian victory

Belligerents
Bulgarian Empire	Byzantine Empire

Commanders and leaders
Samuil of Bulgaria	Gregory Taronites †; Ashot Taronites (POW)

The Battle of Thessalonica (Bulgarian: Битката при Солун) was part of the long Bulgarian–Byzantine war and it occurred in 995 or earlier, near the city of Thessalonica, Greece.

With Byzantine Emperor Basil II away on campaign in Anatolia, General Samuil of Bulgaria launched raids into the territories around Thessalonica. Lacking siege engines to assault the city, Samuil resorted to traditional Bulgarian ambush tactics. His forces succeeded in ambushing and destroying the city's Byzantine garrison, killing its commander Gregory Taronites and capturing his son Ashot. Although victorious, Samuil was not prepared to besiege Thessalonica and instead led his army south into Greece on a plundering expedition. Basil sent an army under his general Nikephoros Ouranos, who defeated Samuil in 997 at the Battle of Spercheios.

== Origins of the conflict ==
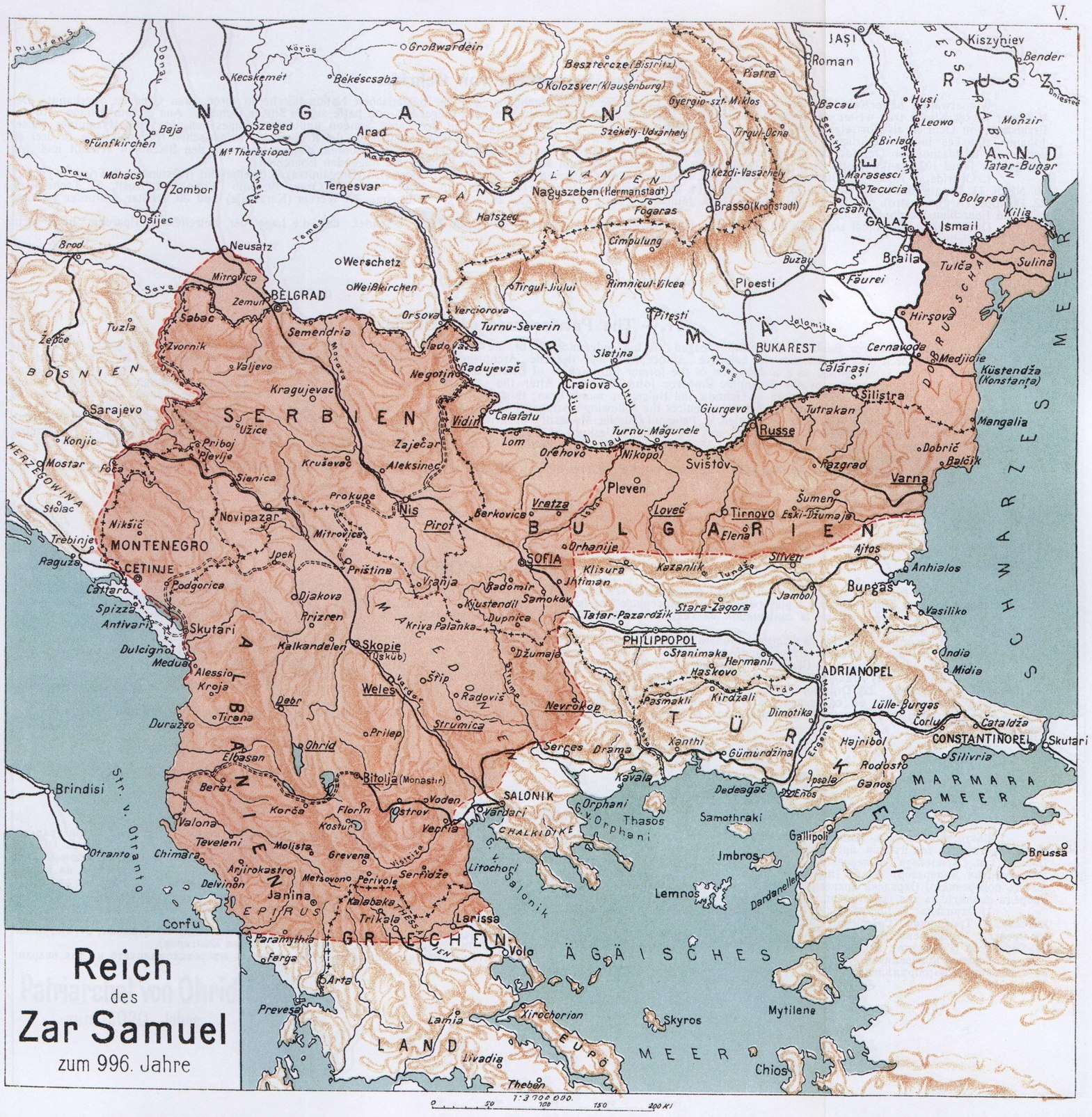
Bulgarian Empire under Samuil c. 996

The Byzantine-Bulgarian conflict was a growing tension between the Byzantine Empire trying to hold its Balkan territories against the Bulgarians who sought an independent state in these lands. Tensions escalated after Byzantine emperor John I Tzimiskes conquered the Bulgarian capital of Preslav in 971. Despite the weakening of the Bulgarian state from this loss, it sparked a renewed Bulgarian resistance leading to a number of Bulgarian victories.

Upon ascending the Byzantine throne at age eighteen in 976, Basil II's reign was troubled by the expansion of the Bulgarians on the Balkan Peninsula and Fatimid Caliphate in the east, as well as by civil wars weakening his rule. In 991, Basil's victory in the civil war in Anatolia provided him the opportunity to counter the rapidly expanding Bulgarian state. By then, Byzantine holdings in the Balkans had been reduced to Thrace, the High Thracian Plain, Thessalonica, and the Greek lands south of Thessaly. Basil considered that only military action could prevent further territorial losses. Despite early setbacks, he reorganized the army and revised its tactics. Over years of attrition and steady territorial gains, he gradually forced the leading Bulgarian general Samuil onto the defensive.

In 994, the general Manjutakin of the Fatimid Caliph al-Aziz resumed offensive actions in Syria, and in September of the same year, defeated the Byzantines at the Battle of the Orontes, forcing Basil to intervene personally in the eastern frontiers. Basil took his main army from the Balkans to Anatolia. He entrusted the remaining forces to Gregory Taronites, the doux (general) of Thessalonica. Following Basil's departure, Samuil reverted to an offensive campaign against Byzantine strongholds and launched raiding operations around Thessalonica.

== Battle ==
Bulgarians lacked siege engines to use against the fortifications of Thessalonica and instead relied on traditional tactics for attacking cities, such as starvation and ambush tactics. Samuil sent a small detachment towards the city, while the main body of his army remained behind to carefully prepare an ambush for the Byzantine army. As the Bulgarian raiding party approached Thessalonica, Gregory Taronites sent his son Ashot Taronites with a small reconnaissance force to make contact with them and reconnoitre the Bulgarian dispositions, while he followed with a detachment from Thessalonica's garrison. Gregory Taronites' plan was to track the raiders and force an engagement on favorable ground. Ashot fell into an ambush and was captured. His father, following up with the main Byzantine force, rushed to his rescue, only to be lured by a feigned Bulgarian retreat into another trap, where he was surrounded and killed.

== Aftermath ==
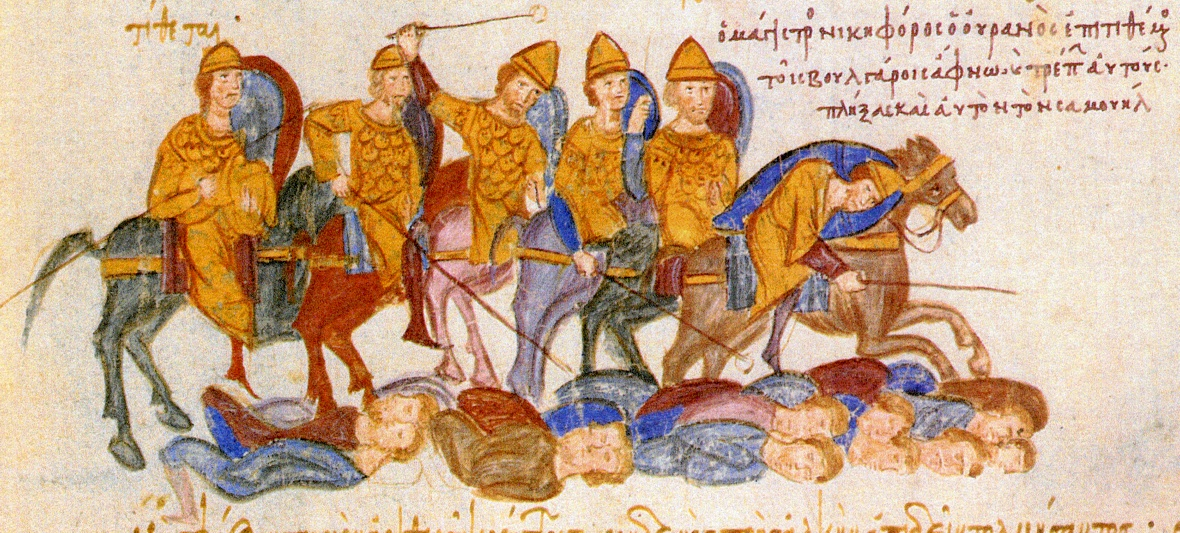
Byzantine drawing depicting Bulgarians put to flight by Ouranos's forces at Spercheios, from the Chronicle of John Skylitzes

Ashot Taronites was made a captive and taken to Bulgaria, where, shortly after, he was wed to Samuil's daughter Miroslava. He was named governor of Dyrrhachium, from where he soon escaped on aboard Byzantine ships to Constantinople and arranged the surrender of the city to the Byzantines.

In Thessalonica, Taronites was succeeded by John Chaldos, who likewise fell victim to a Bulgarian ambush and was captured in 996. Despite weakening the garrison forces of Thessalonica, Samuil was unprepared to lay siege to the city because he lacked a navy to blockade its port. Samuil ventured south into the thema of Hellas to open a new front in Basil's absence. As the Bulgarian forces moved south and inflicted widespread devastation, they captured both Salona and Galaxidion and killed or enslaved their populations. Samuil also captured Larissa and reached Corinth.

Byzantine gains under Basil were threatened by Samuil's offensive. Basil sent a Byzantine army under general Nikephoros Ouranos, who attempted to reconsolidate Byzantine control around Thessalonica. At this point, Samuil learned about the Byzantine activities and returned north. In 997, the two armies met at the Spercheios river, where Samuil was defeated. The long Byzantine-Bulgarian conflict continued until the final defeat of Bulgaria in 1018 at the Battle of Dyrrhachium.

== Sources ==
=== Primary ===
- Skylitzes, John (2010) [c. 1081]. A Synopsis of Byzantine History 811–1057. Translated by Wortley, John. Cambridge: Cambridge University Press. ISBN 978-0-521-76705-7.

=== Secondary ===
- D'Amato, Raffaele (2020). "The army of Basil II in the wars against Samuil the Comitopoulos". War in Eleventh-Century Byzantium. New York: Routledge. pp. 288–314. ISBN 978-0-429-57477-1.
- Holmes, Catherine (2005). Basil II and the Governance of Empire (976–1025). Oxford: Oxford University Press. ISBN 978-0-19-927968-5.
- Hupchick, Dennis P. (2017). The Bulgarian-Byzantine Wars for Early Medieval Balkan Hegemony, Silver-Lined Skulls and Blinded Armies. London: Palgrave Macmillan. ISBN 978-3-319-56206-3.
- Ivanov, Ivelin A. (2011). "Tsar Samuel Against Emperor Basil II Why Did Bulgaria Loose the Battle With the Byzantine Empire at the Beginning of the 11th century". Studia Ceranea. 1: 205–212.
- Kennedy, Hugh (2004) [1986]. The Prophet and the Age of the Caliphates: The Islamic Near East from the 6th to the 11th Century (Second ed.). Harlow: Longman. ISBN 978-0-582-40525-7.
- Makrypoulias, Christos G. (2015). "Cities, Citizens and Sieges in the Balkans, 976–1018" (PDF). In Rakocija, Miša (ed.). Niš and Byzantium XIV: Cities and Citizens in Byzantine World. Vol. 14. pp. 89–96. ISBN 978-86-6101-119-1.
- Strässle, Paul Meinrad (2006). Krieg und Kriegführung in Byzanz: die Kriege Kaiser Basileios' II. gegen die Bulgaren (976–1019) [War And Warfare In Byzantium: Emperor Basil II's War Against The Bulgarians (976–1019)] (in German). Cologne: Böhlau Verlag. ISBN 3-412-17405-X.
