= Gregory Taronites (disambiguation) =

Gregory Taronites (Greek: Γρηγόριος Ταρωνίτης) was an Armenian prince who became a senior Byzantine general.

Gregory Taronites may also refer to:

- Gregory Taronites (governor of Chaldia), governor of the theme of Chaldia, who unsuccessfully rebelled against Alexios I Komnenos
- Gregory Taronites (protovestiarios), palace official and one of the chief ministers of John II Komnenos
