= Taronites =

Taronites Ταρωνίτης
- Noble family
- Parent family: Bagratuni dynasty
- Country: Byzantine Empire
- Etymology: Taron
- Origin: Taron
- Founded: 968
- Founder: Gregory Taronites
- Dissolution: 1204

Taronites (Greek: Ταρωνίτης; Armenian: Տարոնիտես, feminine form Taronitissa Ταρωνίτισσα), was a Byzantine noble family, descended from the ruling family of the Armenian principality of Taron, the Bagratuni dynasty.

It was founded by the brothers Gregory and Bagrat (Pankratios in Greek), who ceded the principality to the Byzantines in 968 in exchange for estates and high dignities.

The family is prominent among the military aristocracy in the late 10th/early 11th centuries, and later became related to the Komnenian dynasty through the marriage of Michael Taronites to Maria, the sister of Alexios I Komnenos. In the 12th century, the Taronitai became mainly civilian bureaucrats, many occupying high posts in the central government in Constantinople. The family lost its status and influence after the dissolution of the Byzantine Empire by the Fourth Crusade in 1204.

== Members ==
- Gregory Taronites (fl. 968–d. c. 991/995), Armenian prince, entered Byzantine service
- Bagrat Taronites (fl. 968), Armenian prince, brother of Gregory
- Ashot Taronites (fl. c. 995–c. 997/8), Byzantine nobleman, handed over Dyrrachion to Byzantium
- Gregory Taronites (fl. 1101–1106), governor of Chaldia
- Gregory Taronites (fl. c. 1118), protovestiarios
- John Taronites (c. 1067–fl. 1106), doux, praetor, anagrapheus
- Michael Taronites (fl. 1063–1094), protosebastos, protovestiarios, panhypersebastos

== Sources ==
- Cheynet, Jean-Claude (1990). Pouvoir et Contestations à Byzance (963–1210) (in French). Paris: Publications de la Sorbonne. ISBN 978-2-85944-168-5.
- Kazhdan, Alexander (1991). "Taronites". In Kazhdan, Alexander (ed.). The Oxford Dictionary of Byzantium. Oxford and New York: Oxford University Press. pp. 2012–2013. ISBN 0-19-504652-8.
