= Gregory Taronites (governor of Chaldia) =

Governor of Chaldia

Gregory Taronites (Greek: Γρηγόριος Ταρωνίτης, romanized: Grēgorios Tarōnitēs; Armenian: Գրիգոր Տարոնիտես) was a Byzantine governor of the theme of Chaldia (modern north-eastern Black Sea coast of Turkey) who rebelled against Emperor Alexios I Komnenos in 1103/4 and governed his province as a virtually independent ruler until his defeat in battle in 1106/7. He was then imprisoned for some time in the Prison of Anemas, before obtaining an imperial pardon. Some scholars have proposed an identification with Gregory Gabras, but this is disputed.

== Origin and early life ==
Gregory belonged to the aristocratic family of the Taronitai, a clan of princely Armenian origin from Taron. His parents are unknown, but he was the nephew of the panhypersebastos Michael Taronites, who married Maria Komnene, the sister of Emperor Alexios I Komnenos (r. 1081–1118). Some scholars, beginning with Karl Hopf and including Alexander Vasiliev and Claude Cahen, argued that Gregory Taronites was the same as Gregory Gabras, attested for the last time c. 1091. This was the son of Theodore Gabras, who had governed the theme of Chaldia as a practically independent ruler from c. 1075 until his death in battle against the Turkomans in 1098. However, this identification is problematic; as Basile Skoulatos argues, Anna Komnene, whose Alexiad is the main source on the period and about the two men's lives, would scarcely have confused them, especially as both were her relatives.

From a series of letters by Archbishop Theophylact of Ohrid, it appears that Gregory Taronites originally held some civilian office in the Balkans, before being entrusted with a mission to the Pontus ca. 1101–1103. There, according to Theophylact, he triumphed against the Seljuk Turks and the Franks, the latter probably a reference to his role in ransoming Bohemond I of Antioch, who had been a captive of the Turks at Neokaisareia since his defeat in the Battle of Melitene in 1100. After completing his mission with success, Gregory returned to Constantinople, where Alexios I named him doux (military governor) of the theme of Chaldia in the Pontus.

== Governorship and rebellion in Chaldia ==
On his arrival at Trebizond, the capital of the province, Gregory resolved to rebel against Alexios, and imprisoned his predecessor, Dabatenos, and various notables of the city. Alexios at first tried to convince him to submit peacefully, offering a full pardon, but Gregory replied with poems insulting the emperor, his family and the senior military and civilian leadership. Consequently, in 1105/6 Alexios dispatched an army under Gregory's cousin John Taronites, Michael's son, against him. Gregory marched inland to Koloneia, from where he intended to seek the aid of the Danishmends of Sebasteia, but John sent his Frankish mercenaries ahead and managed to capture Gregory before this effort bore fruit.

As his earlier offers had been so rudely rejected, Alexios at first intended to have Gregory blinded—the customary punishment for rebellion—but was dissuaded by John, who pleaded for clemency for his cousin; instead, Gregory's hair and beard were shaved, and he was paraded around the streets of Constantinople before being thrown into the Prison of Anemas. At first, Gregory remained obstinate and continued to hurl abuse on the emperor from his cell, but after the intercession of Gregory's friend Nikephoros Bryennios the Younger, the husband of Anna Komnene, he was persuaded to recant and beseech the emperor's pardon. In the end, he was not only released and pardoned, but accorded even higher honours. B. Skoulatos considers him the same as the namesake protovestiarios who was one of the chief ministers in the early reign of John II Komnenos (r. 1118–1143), but he is usually considered a different person.

== Character ==
In his letters, Theophylact of Ohrid, with apparent sincerity, lavished praise on Gregory and his military and administrative ability, and hoped for him to restore the Empire's lost glory. On the other hand, Anna Komnene presents a more sober picture of the man: despite his rebellion, she is not hostile towards him, but emphasizes his headstrong character.

== Sources ==
- Bryer, Anthony M. (1970). "A Byzantine Family: The Gabrades, c. 979 – c. 1653". University of Birmingham Historical Journal. XII. Birmingham: 164–187.
- Kazhdan, Alexander, ed. (1991). The Oxford Dictionary of Byzantium. Oxford and New York: Oxford University Press. ISBN 0-19-504652-8.
- Skoulatos, Basile (1980). Les personnages byzantins de l'Alexiade: Analyse prosopographique et synthèse [The Byzantine Personalities of the Alexiad: Prosopographical Analysis and Synthesis] (in French). Louvain-la-Neuve and Louvain: Bureau du Recueil Collège Érasme and Éditions Nauwelaerts.
