= John Chryselios =

John Chryselios (Greek: Ἰωάννης Χρυσήλιος) was a provincial magnate in the late 10th-century Dyrrhachium, and the father-in-law of Tsar Samuel of Bulgaria (r. 997–1014).

== Biography ==
An Albanian or a Bulgarian in origin, Chryselios was the "leading man" (proteuon) of Dyrrhachium. According to another opinion, his name is not Bulgarian and there is no evidence that Chryselios was Bulgarian; it is suggested that he could have been of Armenian Paulician or of Bogomil origin. His title, Protevon, reveals that he had been elected to lead the commune of Dyrrhachium, apparently a Protaton-republic operating within the imperial institutions of the Dyrrhachium Theme, like e.g. an elected Protevon had been governing the maritime city of Kherson within the institutions of the Kherson Theme, and later on within the Perateia territory, until 1299.

According to a note on the history of John Skylitzes, the Bulgarian tsar Samuel married Chryselios's daughter Agatha, who was taken captive after Samuel sacked the city of Larissa. It is possible that thereby Samuel managed to acquire control over the strategically important Adriatic port city.

After the Battle of Spercheios in 997, Samuel made his son-in-law Ashot Taronites, a Byzantine captive who had married his daughter Miroslava, governor of the city. In circa 1005, however, Ashot and Miroslava, with the connivance of Chryselios, fled on a Byzantine ship to Constantinople, bearing a letter by Chryselios that promised to hand over the city to the Byzantine emperor, Basil II (r. 976–1025), in exchange for the rank of patrikios for himself and his two sons. Soon, a Byzantine squadron appeared off the city under Eustathios Daphnomeles, and the city returned to Byzantine rule, but Chryselios had died in the meantime. It is, however, possible that this episode actually took place as late as 1018, at the end of the Bulgarian war, since the chronology of the war's primary source, John Skylitzes, is unclear; while the Italian chronicle of Lupus Protospatharius gives a completely different date for the recovery of Dyrrhachium, 1004/5, and does not mention Chryselios at all.

== Family ==
Apart from his daughter Agatha, modern Bulgarian scholars equate a patrikios Nicholas Chryselios or Nicholas the Bulgarian, recorded by Skylitzes as being active under Romanos III Argyros (r. 1028–1034), with one of John Chryselios' sons. A certain Theodoretos, who was the father of Theodora Kosara, the wife of Prince Jovan Vladimir of Duklja, has also been suggested by modern scholarship as one of Chryselios' sons.

== Sources ==
- Holmes, Catherine (2005). Basil II and the Governance of Empire (976–1025). Oxford: Oxford University Press. ISBN 978-0-19-927968-5.
- Lilie, Ralph-Johannes; Ludwig, Claudia; Zielke, Beate; Pratsch, Thomas, eds. (2013). "Prosopographie der mittelbyzantinischen Zeit Online". Prosopographie der mittelbyzantinischen Zeit Online. Berlin-Brandenburgische Akademie der Wissenschaften. Nach Vorarbeiten F. Winkelmanns erstellt (in German). De Gruyter.
- Stephenson, Paul (2003). The Legend of Basil the Bulgar-Slayer. Cambridge: Cambridge University Press. ISBN 978-0-521-81530-7.
