= Eustathios Daphnomeles =

Byzantine general and governor

- Εὐστάθιος Δαφνομήλης
- Died: after 1029
- Military career
- Allegiance: Byzantine Empire
- Commands: strategos of various themes
- Wars: Byzantine conquest of Bulgaria

Eustathios Daphnomeles (Greek: Εὐστάθιος Δαφνομήλης, fl. early 11th century) was a Byzantine strategos and patrician who distinguished himself in the Byzantine conquest of Bulgaria. He ranks as one of the most prominent and successful generals in the thirty-year war between Emperor Basil II (r. 976–1025) and Samuel of Bulgaria (r. 997–1014), helping to end the long conflict by blinding and capturing the last Bulgarian leader, Ibatzes, in 1018.

== Biography ==
The main source describing Daphnomeles's life, and indeed the Bulgarian campaigns (986–1018) of Emperor Basil II, is the late 11th-century Synopsis Historion of John Skylitzes, whose chronology is often problematic to reconstruct. Daphnomeles came from the landed aristocracy of Asia Minor, which for centuries provided the Byzantine military elite. Traditional historiography places his first appearance in circa 1005, when the Adriatic port city of Dyrrhachium is said to have been surrendered by John Chryselios, a local magnate, to the Byzantines. Daphnomeles, at the head of a fleet, took possession of the city. Given the chronologically unclear narrative of Skylitzes, however, it is possible that this episode reflects his later appointment (after 1018) as strategos (military governor) of the city.

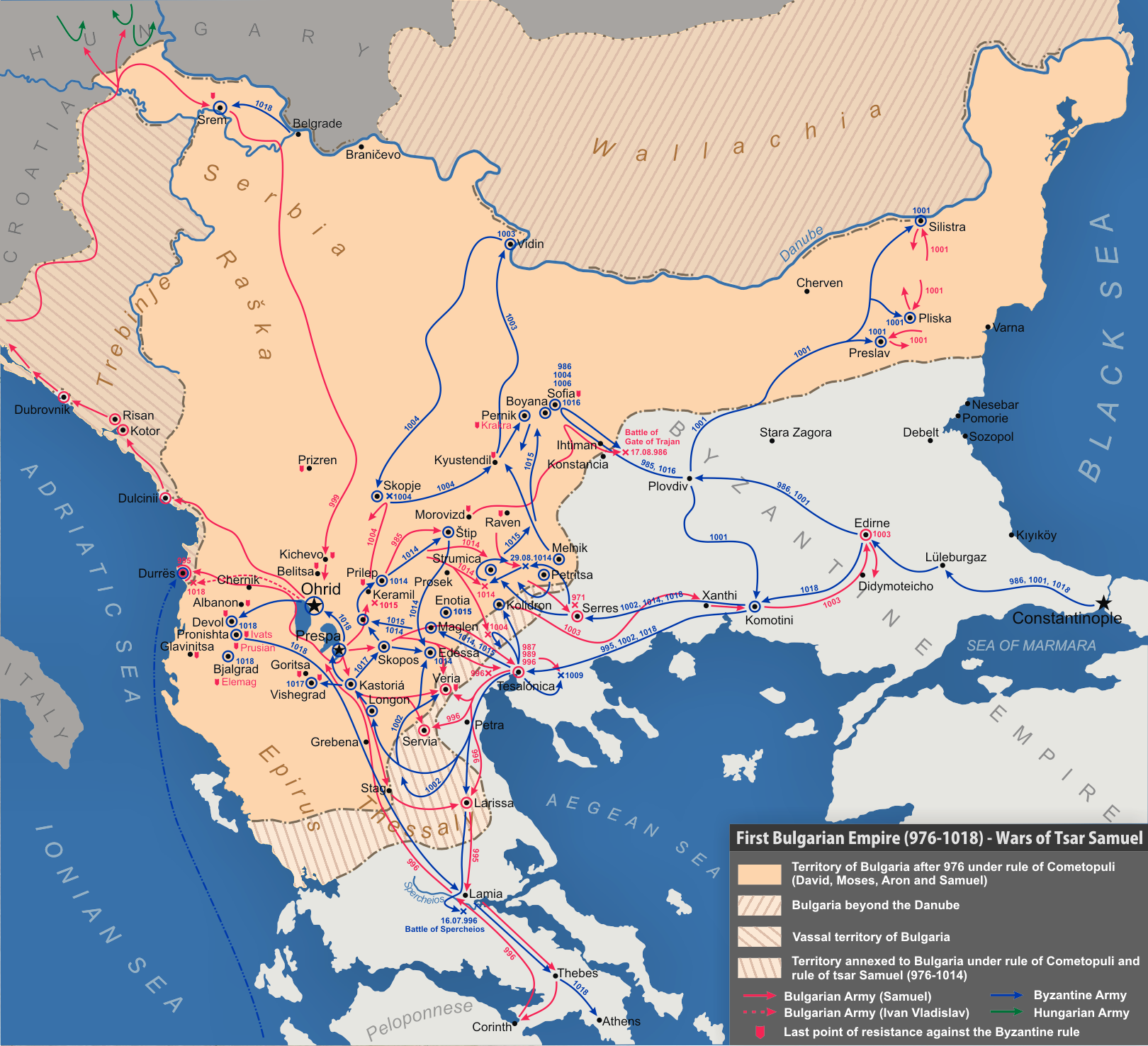
Map of the Byzantine–Bulgarian wars in the time of Emperor Basil II and Tsar Samuel of Bulgaria

Daphnomeles participated in the subsequent conflicts against Tsar Samuel, but his greatest feat was the capture of the Bulgarian leader Ibatzes in 1018, for which he is given a prominent position in Skylitzes's work. Following the defeat at the Battle of Kleidion in 1015, Bulgarian resistance began to collapse. By 1018, most Bulgarian commanders had surrendered, and only Ibatzes, who had retreated with his followers to the royal estate of Pronishte, a naturally strong and defensible highland position, continued to resist. He rejected both bribes and threats from the Byzantines, and for 55 days, the Byzantine army under Emperor Basil II remained encamped at Deabolis nearby, waiting for his surrender. At that point, and as local crowds gathered to Ibatzes's palace for the feast of the Dormition, Daphnomeles, now strategos of nearby Achrida, on his own initiative, resolved to end the impasse. With only two escorts, he climbed the way to the estate, and announced himself to Ibatzes. Ibatzes, believing that Daphnomeles would not have come alone unless he intended to forge an alliance against Basil, retreated with the strategos to a secluded wooded glade in the gardens for a private discussion. There, Daphnomeles and his two hidden associates sprang on the Bulgarian general, blinded him, and carried him to the upper story of the palace, through the assembled crowds who were too stunned to react. When the Bulgarians recovered, they gathered underneath the building crying for revenge. Daphnomeles, however, addressed them and managed to convince them of the futility of further resistance, and to lay down their arms and seek the emperor's pardon.

Ibatzes' capture on 15 August 1018 brought to an end the long conflict between Byzantium and Bulgaria, and according to the Byzantinist Paul Stephenson, secured for Daphnomeles, along with Nikephoros Ouranos and Nikephoros Xiphias, the reputation of one of the most prominent and successful generals in the Bulgarian wars of Basil II.

Following his feat, Daphnomeles was appointed strategos of the thema of Dyrrhachium by a grateful emperor, and given all of Ibatzes's movable wealth as a reward. In 1029, however, he was accused of conspiring with other prominent governors of the Balkans to overthrow Emperor Romanos III Argyros (r. 1028–1034) in favour of doux Constantine Diogenes. The accused were then recalled to Constantinople, beaten, paraded through the Mese, and banished. Nothing further is known of him.

== Sources ==
- Holmes, Catherine (2005). Basil II and the Governance of Empire (976–1025). Oxford: Oxford University Press. ISBN 978-0-19-927968-5.
- Kaldellis, Anthony (2017). A Cabinet of Byzantine Curiosities: Strange Tales and Surprising Facts from History's Most Orthodox Empire. Oxford University Press. ISBN 9780190625962.
- Lilie, Ralph-Johannes; Ludwig, Claudia; Pratsch, Thomas; Zielke, Beate (2013). Prosopographie der mittelbyzantinischen Zeit Online. Berlin-Brandenburgische Akademie der Wissenschaften. Nach Vorarbeiten F. Winkelmanns erstellt (in German). Berlin and Boston: De Gruyter.
- Stephenson, Paul (2003). The Legend of Basil the Bulgar-Slayer. Cambridge: Cambridge University Press. ISBN 978-0-521-81530-7.
- Wortley, John, ed. (2010). John Skylitzes: A Synopsis of Byzantine History, 811–1057. Cambridge: Cambridge University Press. ISBN 978-0-521-76705-7.
