= Gregory Taronites (protovestiarios) =

Byzantine administrator

Gregory Taronites (Greek: Γρηγόριος Ταρωνίτης, romanized: Grēgorios Tarōnitēs; Armenian: Գրիգոր Տարոնիտես; fl. c. 1118) was an aristocrat and administrator in the Byzantine Empire, during the reign of John II Komnenos.

== Background and life ==
The Taronites family were Byzantine aristocrats descended from Ashot III, ruler of Taron, an Armenian principality. Ashot's son Gregory Taronites (died c. 991 - 995) surrendered Taron to the Byzantine Empire in return for extensive lands within the Empire, and entered Byzantine service.

On the accession of John II, in 1118, Gregory Taronites was appointed to the post of protovestiarios, and thus became the most senior financial official in the imperial household, entrusted with the emperor's private treasury, and was also involved in the Byzantine administration more generally. Taronites was a kinsman and blood relative of John II, through the marriage of his father, Michael Taronites, to his mother, Maria, the sister of Alexios I Komnenos; intermarriage with the imperial Komnenoi dynasty that predated 1081 and the start of the reign of Alexios I.

At the same time that Taronites was appointed, John II appointed another kinsman, John Komnenos, to the post of parakoimomenos. In office, John Komnenos revealed an inept, unrestrained and presumptuous nature, and was soon removed from his post. In contrast, Taronites proved himself to be prudent and did not overstep the limits of his authority, he retained his position of power. It is unknown if Taronites took over the responsibilities of his erstwhile colleague.

== Bibliography ==
- Niketas Choniates, critical edition and translation by Magoulias, Harry J., ed. (1984). O City of Byzantium: Annals of Niketas Choniatēs. Detroit: Wayne State University Press. ISBN 978-0-8143-1764-8.
- Kazhdan, Alexander (1991). "Taronites". In Kazhdan, Alexander (ed.). The Oxford Dictionary of Byzantium. Oxford and New York: Oxford University Press. pp. 2012–2013. ISBN 0-19-504652-8.
- Lau, Maximilian C. G. (2024) Emperor John II Komnenos: Rebuilding New Rome 1118-1143, Oxford University Press, Oxford ISBN 978-0-19-888867-3
- Magdalino, Paul (1993). The Empire of Manuel I Komnenos, 1143–1180. Cambridge: Cambridge University Press. ISBN 0-521-52653-1.
