= Nikephoros Ouranos =

10/11th-century Byzantine military officer

Magistros
- Viceroy of the East c.999 – c. 1011
- Domestic of the Schools of the West; 996 – c. 999
- Monarch: Basil II

Patrikios
- Epi tou kanikleiou c. 982 – c. 987
- Monarch: Basil II

Personal details
- Born: c. 950
- Died: c. 1011

Military service
- Allegiance: Byzantine Empire
- Years of service: 996–c.1011
- Battles/wars: Byzantine conquest of Bulgaria; Battle of Spercheios; Byzantine–Georgian wars

Nikephoros Ouranos (Greek: Νικηφόρος Οὐρανός; fl. c. 980 – c. 1010), Latinized as Nicephorus Uranus, was a high-ranking Byzantine official and general during the reign of Emperor Basil II (r. 976–1025). One of the emperor's closest associates, he was active in Europe in the wars against the Bulgarians, scoring a major victory at Spercheios, and against the Arabs in Syria, where he held command during the first decade of the 11th century as Basil's virtual viceroy. A well-educated man, he wrote a military manual (Taktika) and composed several surviving poems and hagiographies.

== Biography ==
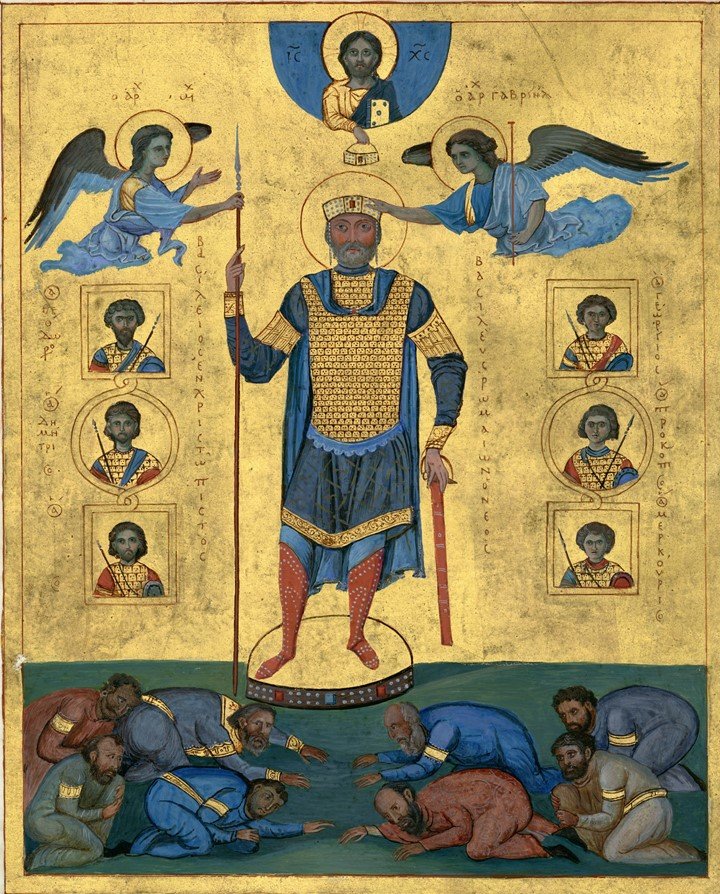
The Byzantine emperor Basil II (r. 976–1025). Nikephoros Ouranos was one of his closest and most trusted collaborators.

Very little is known of Ouranos's origin, his early years, or his family, and the chronicles represent him very much as a "new man". A prōtospatharios and asēkrētis Basil Ouranos, possibly an elder relative, is attested, and we know from Nikephoros's letters that he had a brother named Michael. Nikephoros Ouranos himself first enters history in the early 980s, during negotiations between Byzantium and the Buyid ruler of Baghdad for the return of the renegade rebel general Bardas Skleros. After the first Byzantine embassy in 980, an Arab embassy under Ibn Shahram visited Constantinople in 982, and Ouranos is mentioned in its report as a confidant of the young Basil II, holding the high court position of epi tou kanikleiou (keeper of the kanikleion, the imperial inkstand). Ibn Shahram further mentioned that Ouranos's close association with the emperor made him an enemy to the powerful eunuch parakoimomenos, Basil Lekapenos, who had supervised the affairs of state for decades. During the negotiations, Ouranos functioned as the intermediary between the Arabs and the emperor, and he was subsequently chosen by the parakoimomenos to head a Byzantine delegation to Baghdad, which would take custody of Skleros.

Once in Baghdad, however, Ouranos was accused of either trying to poison or negotiate in secret with Skleros and was imprisoned. The charges against him were likely orchestrated by Basil Lekapenos, who wished to get rid of him. He remained in prison in Baghdad until after Bardas Skleros himself was let go in late 986, and was back at Constantinople in 987. By that time, Basil Lekapenos had fallen from power and had died, and Ouranos continued to enjoy imperial favour. He was given the rank of magistros, and his influential position is evident from the fact that Saint Athanasius the Athonite appointed him as the first lay guardian (epitropos) of his monastery of the Great Lavra.

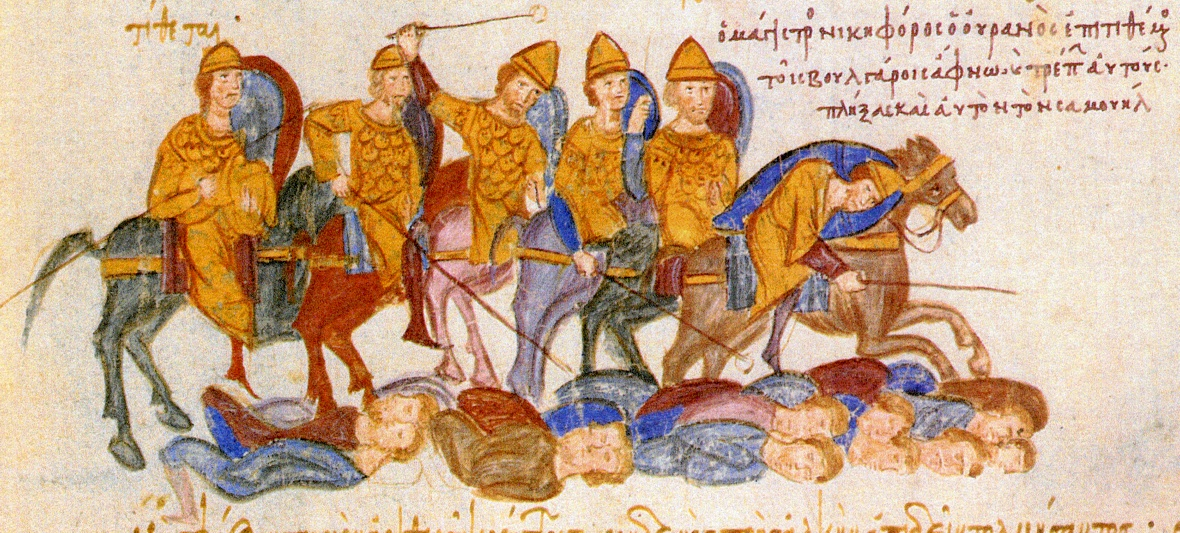
Bulgarians put to flight by Ouranos's forces at Spercheios, from the Chronicle of John Skylitzes.

Following the death of the military governor (doux) of Thessalonica, Gregory Taronites, in battle against the Bulgarians in 996, Basil II appointed Ouranos as Domestic of the Schools of the West; in effect, commander-in-chief of the European field army. Following their success, the Bulgarians had penetrated deep into Greece, raiding and pillaging even unto Corinth in the Peloponnese. In 997, Ouranos assembled his forces at Thessalonica and marched south to meet them, while the Bulgarian Tsar Samuel, upon hearing of his coming, turned north. The two armies eventually met on the banks of the river Spercheios in Central Greece, which was flooded due to heavy rainfall in the preceding days, rendering it impassable. Both armies thus encamped on opposite shores of the river. The Bulgarians, confident that the Byzantines could not cross the river, neglected to station guards. Ouranos, however, found a ford further upstream, took his army across during the night and attacked the Bulgarian camp. The battle was a rout, as the majority of the Bulgarians, caught unawares, were either killed or captured. Even Tsar Samuel and his son were wounded and only escaped by lying among the slain.

Ouranos continued campaigning in the area over the next years, although no information about his operations is provided by the chronicler Skylitzes, the main source. In December 999, Ouranos was appointed doux of Antioch in Syria, one of the most important Byzantine regional military commands. Following the death of the previous doux, Damian Dalassenos, in the battle against the Fatimids in 998, Emperor Basil himself had campaigned in the area in the previous year, hoping to stabilize the eastern frontier to enable him to devote his resources in the West against Bulgaria. In the spring of 1000, Ouranos accompanied Basil in his campaign, which led to the annexation of the Georgian principality of Tao, and defended this new possession from attacks by Gurgen of Iberia in 1001–1002.

After arranging a ten-year truce with the Fatimids in 1001, the trusted Ouranos was meant to be Basil's representative in the eastern border areas and was armed with plenipotentiary authority, as attested by a seal declaring him "master of the East" (ὁ κρατῶν τῆς Ἀνατολῆς). In 1000–1001, Ouranos quelled an uprising by two Syrian Bedouin tribes, the Noumeritai and the Ataphitai. In 1005–1007, he was engaged in operations against the Arab rebel Al-Asfar, whom he finally defeated in 1007. Nothing is known of Ouranos after that date, although the fact that a successor as doux of Antioch was not appointed until 1011 may mean that he continued to occupy the office until then.

== Works ==
=== Ouranos's Taktika ===
The 10th century saw a revival in the practice of writing encyclopedic works, including military manuals, in the Byzantine Empire. Nikephoros's Taktika (Greek: Τακτικά) represent the final example among the latter, and were written while he was governor of Antioch.

The work consists of 178 chapters, which can be divided into the following parts:

- Chapters 1–55 are a paraphrase of the Tactica of Emperor Leo VI the Wise (r. 886–912).
- Chapters 56–62 are a paraphrase of the Praecepta Militaria of Emperor Nikephoros II Phokas (r. 963–969), while the appended chapters 63–65 reflect Ouranos's own experience and are emendations of earlier texts reflecting the new circumstances of Byzantine warfare in the early 11th century.
- Chapters 66–74 are derived from the 1st-century author Onasander.
- Chapters 75–175 and 176–178 likewise are derived from ancient authors.

Of Ouranos's additions, chapter 63 deals with raids into enemy territory. Chapter 64 discusses the problem of breaking camp and setting to march when the enemy is nearby, as well as the forced passing of a defile held by the enemy (drawn from earlier authors). Chapter 65 concerns itself with siegecraft.

The latter is especially notable for the importance given to psychological and diplomatic factors during a siege. For instance, he notes the importance of taking precautions even against Christian subjects supplying a Muslim enemy with grain, cheese, or livestock because the high price offered will otherwise prove tempting. Likewise, he suggests alternating between gracious offers of clemency and harsh threats of reprisals (especially against Armenian and Syriac Christians, apostates to Islam (Greek: μαγαρίται), and other heretics) whether one plans to honor these or not, as such vacillation will produce dissension among the defenders.

Oddly enough, though Ouranos refers to trebuchets, it appears he (and by extension the Byzantines) used them against the defenders along the walls, and not against the walls themselves. Apparently in ignorance of the destructive power at his command, he writes: "The men of old, in their pursuit of siege warfare, constructed many devices such as battering rams, wooden towers, scaling ladders with various features, tortoises, and all kinds of other things which our generation can hardly imagine. It has, however, tried all these devices and found that out of all of them, the most effective way, one the enemy cannot match, is undermining the foundations."

=== Other works ===
Ouranos was also a pious man, attempting to live a monkish life without disengaging from worldly affairs. As mentioned above, he was entrusted with the upkeep of the Great Lavra monastery, and in his youth he was apparently a friend of Saint Symeon Metaphrastes, on whose death he wrote a poem in lament.

He authored two known hagiographical texts, the metaphrasis The Life of Symeon of the Wondrous Mountain and The Passion of Theodore the Recruit.

Preceded by Damian Dalassenos	Doux of Antioch; 999–1007/11	Unknown Title next held by Michael the koitonites (1011)
Preceded by John Chaldos	Governor (doux) of Thessalonica; 996–999	Succeeded by David Areianites
