= Agatha (wife of Samuel of Bulgaria) =

- Born: Larissa, Byzantine Empire
- Spouse: Samuel of Bulgaria
- Issue: Miroslava; Gavril Radomir two unnamed daughters

Agatha (Bulgarian: Агата, Greek: Άγάθη; fl. late 10th century) was the wife of Emperor Samuel of Bulgaria.

== Biography ==
According to a later addition to the history of the late-11th-century Byzantine historian John Skylitzes, Agatha was a captive from Larissa, and the daughter of the magnate of Dyrrhachium, John Chryselios. Skylitzes explicitly refers to her as the mother of Samuel's heir Gavril Radomir, which means that she was probably Samuel's wife. On the other hand, Skylitzes later mentions that Gavril Radomir himself also took a beautiful captive, named Irene, from Larissa as his wife. According to the editors of the Prosopographie der mittelbyzantinischen Zeit, this may have been a source of confusion for a later copyist, and Agatha's real origin was not Larissa, but Dyrrhachium. According to the same work, it is likely that she had died by ca. 998, when her father surrendered Dyrrhachium to the Byzantine emperor Basil II.

Only two of Samuel's and Agatha's children are definitely known by name: Gavril Radomir and Miroslava. Two further, unnamed, daughters are mentioned in 1018, while Samuel is also recorded as having had a bastard son.

Agatha is one of the central characters in Dimitar Talev's novel Samuil.

== Sources ==
- Lilie, Ralph-Johannes; Ludwig, Claudia; Pratsch, Thomas; Zielke, Beate (2013). Prosopographie der mittelbyzantinischen Zeit Online. Berlin-Brandenburgische Akademie der Wissenschaften. Nach Vorarbeiten F. Winkelmanns erstellt (in German). Berlin and Boston: De Gruyter.
