= Michael Taronites =

Byzantine aristocrat

Michael Taronites (Greek: Μιχαήλ Ταρωνίτης, fl. 1063–1094) was a Byzantine aristocrat and brother-in-law of Emperor Alexios I Komnenos. He was involved in a conspiracy against him and was banished in 1094.

== Biography ==
Michael belonged to the aristocratic family of the Taronitai, a princely clan of Armenian origin from Taron. His father, the patrikios Gregory Taronites, had been involved in a conspiracy against the megas domestikos Constantine, brother of Emperor Michael IV the Paphlagonian (r. 1034–1041).

In c. 1061–1063 he married Maria Komnene, the oldest daughter of the megas domestikos John Komnenos and Anna Dalassene, and sister of the future emperor Alexios I Komnenos (r. 1081–1118). In 1070, Michael accompanied his brother-in-law, Manuel Komnenos, on campaign against the Seljuk Turks, and was taken prisoner with him and Nikephoros Melissenos by a Turkish warband. However, Manuel soon persuaded the Turkish leader, Chrysoskoulos, to enter Byzantine service, and the three were set free. His career until the rise to the throne of Alexios I in 1081 is otherwise unknown.

As emperor, Alexios swiftly promoted Michael to the highest court dignities: Michael was named protosebastos and protovestiarios, before receiving the newly created title of panhypersebastos, which placed him on par with the Caesar Nikephoros Melissenos. Despite these high honours, he became involved in the conspiracy of Nikephoros Diogenes, the son and briefly co-emperor of Romanos IV Diogenes (r. 1068–1071). The conspiracy was discovered in June 1094, and its leaders, Diogenes, Michael Taronites, and Katakalon Kekaumenos, were banished and their properties confiscated. The other conspirators were soon after blinded, but Taronites escaped this fate due to the intervention of his wife. His fate after that is unknown, as is that of Maria Komnene; she may have become a nun with the monastic name Anna. Both were certainly dead by 1136.

The couple had two sons, and possibly a daughter, who may have been named Anna, but is otherwise unknown. The sons were:

- John Taronites (born c. 1067), who served as provincial governor and commander, he suppressed the revolt of his cousin Gregory Taronites.
- Gregory Taronites (born c. 1075/80), protovestiarios and chief minister during the early reign of John II Komnenos.

== Sources ==
- Kazhdan, Alexander, ed. (1991). The Oxford Dictionary of Byzantium. Oxford and New York: Oxford University Press. ISBN 0-19-504652-8.
- Skoulatos, Basile (1980). Les personnages byzantins de l'Alexiade: Analyse prosopographique et synthèse [The Byzantine Personalities of the Alexiad: Prosopographical Analysis and Synthesis] (in French). Louvain-la-Neuve: Nauwelaerts.
- Varzos, Konstantinos (1984). Η Γενεαλογία των Κομνηνών [The Genealogy of the Komnenoi] (PDF) (in Greek). Vol. A. Thessaloniki: Centre for Byzantine Studies, University of Thessaloniki. Archived from the original (PDF) on 2014-02-03.
