= Grigor I of Taron =

Prince of Taron
- Reign: 898 – 923/936
- Predecessor: Gurgen
- Successor: Bagrat II and Ashot III
- Born: c. 860
- Died: 923/936
- Issue: Bagrat II; Ashot III
- Dynasty: Bagratid
- Father: Derenik
Imperial Service
Magistros
Strategos of Taron c. 906 – 923/936
Monarchs	Leo VI; Alexander; Constantine VII; Romanos I

Grigor I of Taron (Armenian: Գրիգոր; Greek: Κρικορίκιος/Γρηγόριος ὁ Ταρωνίτης, Krikorikios/Grēgorios ho Tarōnitēs) was an Armenian noble of the Bagratid family and ruler of the southern Armenian region of Taron from ca. 896/98 until his death in 923/36.

== Life ==
Grigor was a member of the Bagratid dynasty of Armenia. Of his father only the name is known, Derenik or T‘ornik, who was evidently the brother of Ashot I of Taron and son of Bagrat I of Taron.

After the death of his cousin, Gurgen I of Taron, ca. 896, Grigor became, probably with Arab support, prince of Taron (896/98). From the start he played a double game of diplomacy with the two great powers of the region, the Abbasid Caliphate and the Byzantine Empire, then ruled by Caliph al-Mu'tadid (r. 892–902) and Emperor Leo VI the Wise (r. 886–912) respectively. According to the De administrando imperio of the Byzantine emperor Constantine VII Porphyrogennetos (r. 913–959), he pledged his allegiance to Leo VI, exchanging precious gifts with him, while at the same time allowing the Caliph's armies to cross his lands to raid Byzantine territory and betraying Byzantine campaign plans to the Arabs. Leo sent repeated messages inviting him to visit Constantinople, but Gigor refused, citing the vulnerability of his domains to Arab attack in his absence. Grigor also fought against his nephews or cousins, the two "sons of Arkaikas"—"Arkaikas" has been identified with either Ashot II of Taron or his father David—and took them captive. King Smbat I of Armenia, who was also their uncle, pleaded with Leo to intercede so that they would not be delivered to the Arabs. Leo sent Sinoutes and Constantine Lips as envoys to Grigor. The embassy resulted in the visit of Grigor's bastard son, Ashot III, to Constantinople, followed at a later date by Grigor's brother Abu Ghanim and the "sons of Arkaikas". All the Armenian nobles received Byzantine titles and were then sent home.

Following another embassy by Constantine Lips, Grigor finally assented to go to Constantinople. This visit has been variously dated between ca. 900, based on the traditional dating of a ceremonial reception of a "Prince of Taron" at the Magnaura palace that is recorded in Constantine VII's De ceremoniis, and Leo's death in 912, with ca. 906 being considered the most likely date. In Constantinople Grigor received a lavish welcome, as well as the titles of "magistros and strategos of Taron", the use of the "House of Barbaros" as a residence in the imperial capital and a personal annual payment of ten pounds each of gold nomismata and of silver miliaresia. After a prolonged sojourn in Constantinople, he was escorted to his domains by Lips. The award of the title of strategos, normally borne by the governors of Byzantine themes, may indicate that at this point, Taron was regarded by the imperial government as a de facto Byzantine province, and not just a vassal state.

The De administrando imperio reports that the favour and honours heaped upon Grigor provoked the envy of the neighbouring Armenian and Iberian princes, who eventually protested to emperor Romanos I Lekapenos (r. 920–944). Romanos I responded that he could not withdraw the privileges granted by his predecessor, Leo VI, by imperial chrysobull, but that he would demand a recompense by Grigor. The latter offered to pay an annual tribute in form of copper wares and clothes worth ten pounds, but after three or four years he ceased, and his annual payment from the Byzantines ceased. At some point after 923, Grigor also exchanged the "House of Barbaros", possibly due to its costly upkeep, with the "estate of Gregoras" in the district of Keltzene. He died sometime between ca, 923 and ca. 936, and was succeeded by his sons, Bagrat II of Taron and Ashot III of Taron.

== Sources ==
- Guilland, Rodolphe (1967). Recherches sur les institutions byzantines [Studies on the Byzantine Institutions]. Berliner byzantinische Arbeiten 35 (in French). Vol. I. Berlin and Amsterdam: Akademie-Verlag & Adolf M. Hakkert. OCLC 878894516.
- Lilie, Ralph-Johannes; Ludwig, Claudia; Pratsch, Thomas; Zielke, Beate (2013). Prosopographie der mittelbyzantinischen Zeit Online. Berlin-Brandenburgische Akademie der Wissenschaften. Nach Vorarbeiten F. Winkelmanns erstellt (in German). Berlin and Boston: De Gruyter.
