= Apographeus =

Political office in the Byzantine Empire

Apographeus (Greek: ἀπογραφεύς) was a fiscal office in the last centuries of the Byzantine Empire.

The office first appears in the Komnenian period, either under Alexios I Komnenos (r. 1081–1118) or at any rate by the third quarter of the 12th century, and apparently replaced the anagrapheus. The office continued in existence until the end of the Byzantine Empire in the 15th century. The apographeus was in charge of the land survey (apographē) that served as the basis for the tax assessment owed by individuals, as well for the purpose of redivision of lands (merismos) and the assessment of imperial grants of revenue (posotēs) of an estate to pronoia holders or to establishments such as monasteries and other pious foundations. The post of apographeus was often held in tandem by the governor (doux, kephalē) of a province.

== Sources ==
- Kazhdan, Alexander (1991). "Apographeus". In Kazhdan, Alexander (ed.). The Oxford Dictionary of Byzantium. New York and Oxford: Oxford University Press. p. 134. ISBN 978-0-19-504652-6.
