= Prison of Anemas =

Byzantine building in Istanbul, Turkey

Coordinates: 41.03848°N 28.94083°E

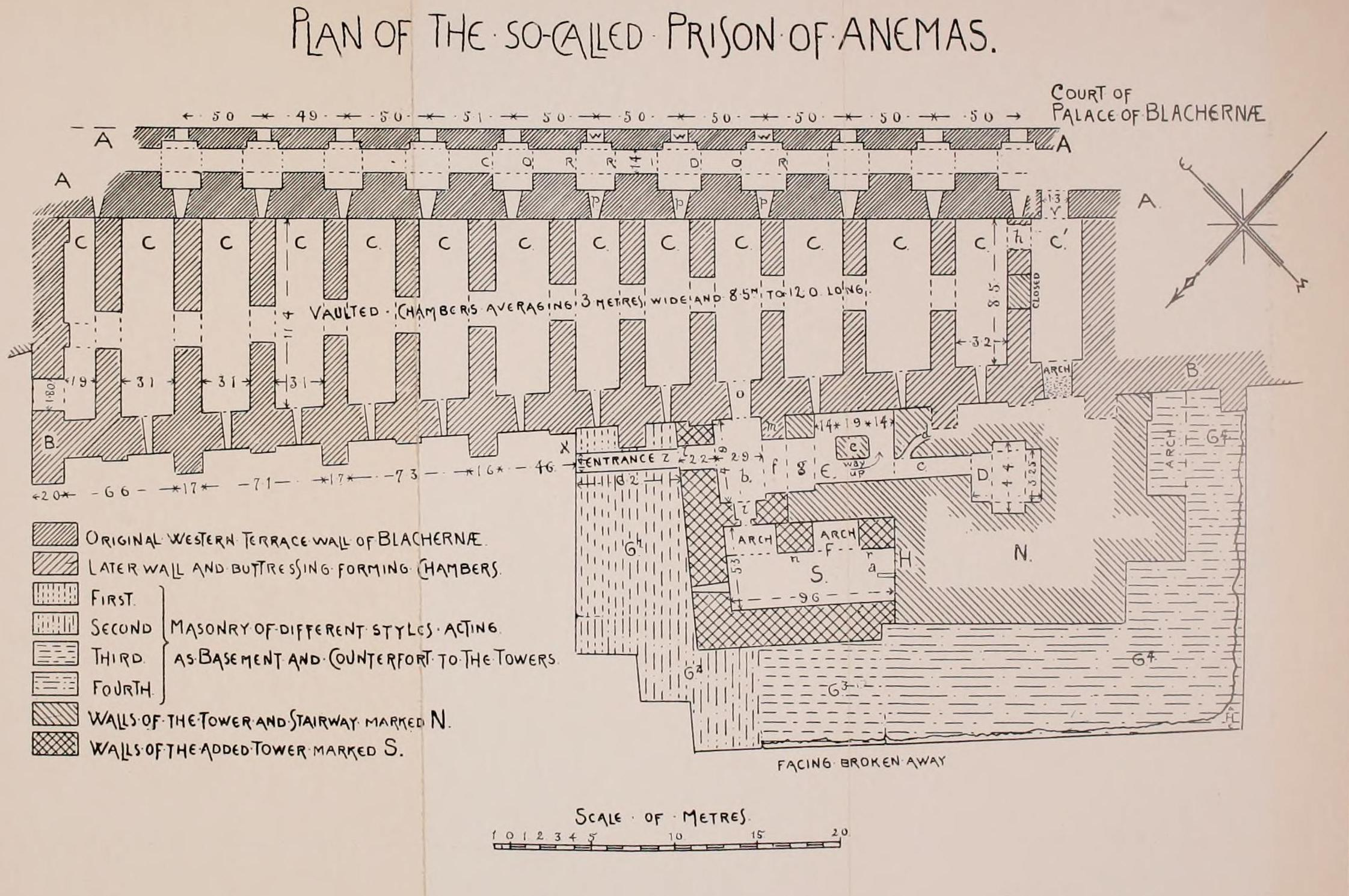
Sketch plan of the layout of the Anemas Prison by Alexander van Millingen.

The Prison of Anemas (Turkish: Anemas Zindanları) is a large Byzantine building attached to the walls of the city of Constantinople (modern-day Istanbul, Turkey). It is traditionally identified with the prisons named after Michael Anemas, a Byzantine general who rose in unsuccessful revolt against Emperor Alexios I Komnenos (r. 1081–1118) and was the first person to be imprisoned there. The prison features prominently in the last centuries of the Byzantine Empire, when four Byzantine emperors were imprisoned there.

== Description ==
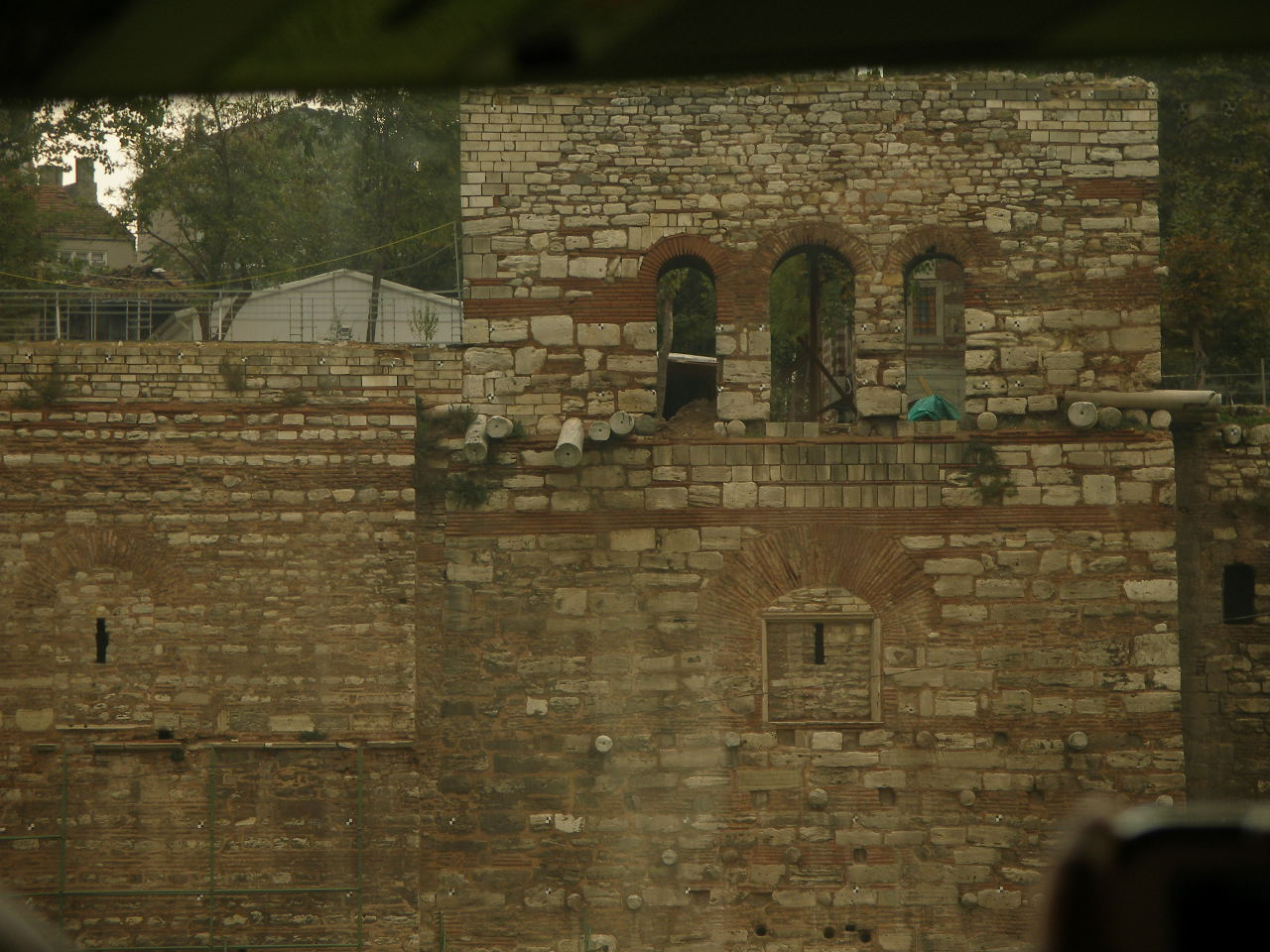
The so-called Tower of Isaac Angelos, with its characteristically irregular masonry with the reused stone columns.

The building is located in the suburb of Blachernae, between the mid-12th century stretch of walls constructed by the Emperor Manuel I Komnenos (r. 1143–1180) and the earlier walls of Byzantine emperors Heraclius (r. 610–641) and Leo V the Armenian (r. 813–820). A small stretch of wall connects the structure to the east with the wall of Manuel Komnenos. The structure's outer wall itself is extraordinarily high, rising as high as 23 m above the ground in front of it, and is 11–20 m thick. Behind the outer curtain wall, the building consists of twelve three-storied chambers. Its outer face features two rectangular towers built side-by-side, with one shared wall. The twin towers are in turn supported by a massive buttress, which stands almost 8 m above the ground level and projects from 6.5–9 m in front of the towers themselves.

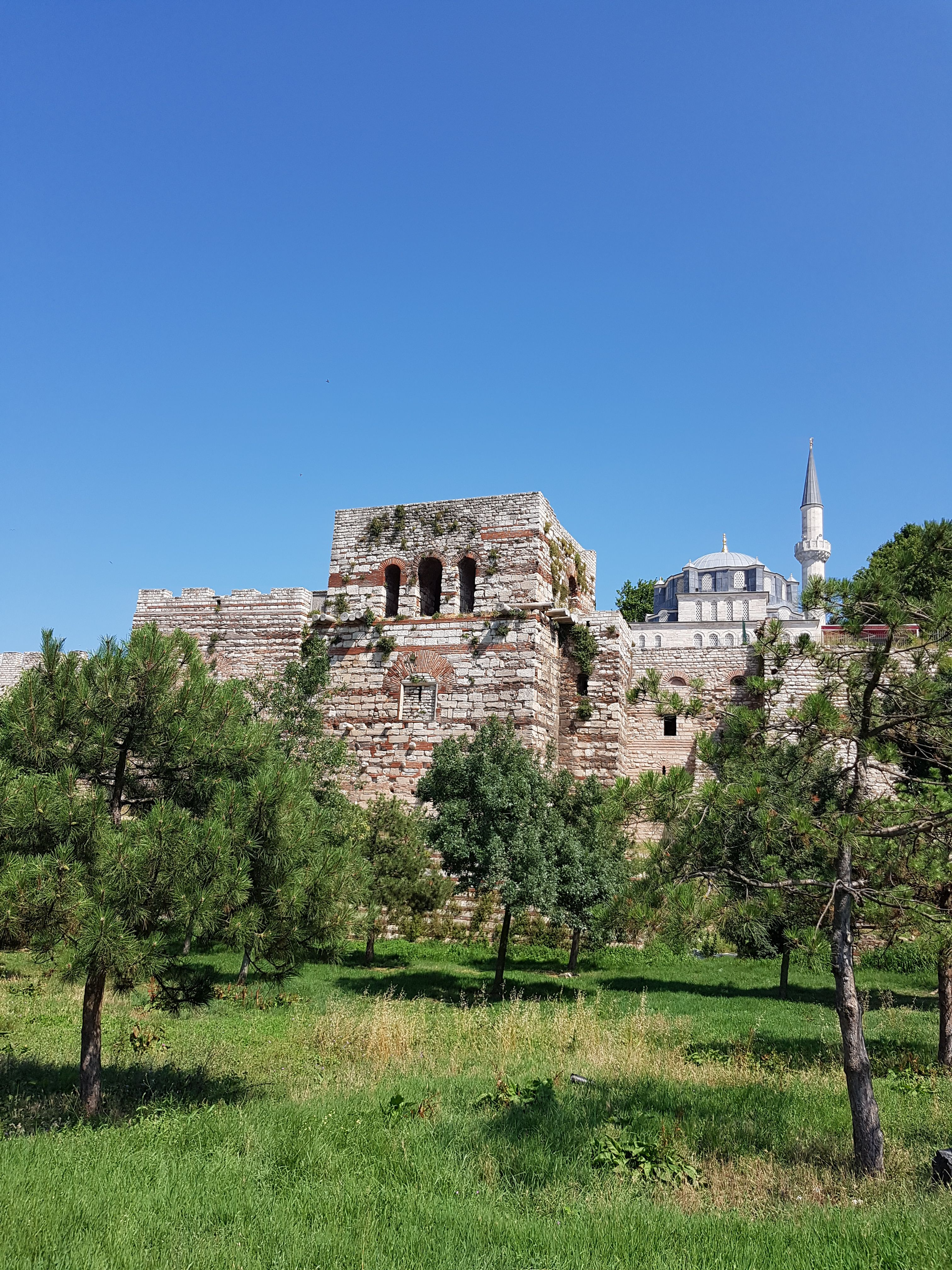
The so-called Tower of Isaac Angelos with Kazasker İvaz Efendi Mosque in the background

Despite their proximity, the two towers differ greatly in construction, a difference that extends to the breastwork as well, pointing to a construction at different dates. The southern tower is an irregularly quadrilateral two-story structure. Its masonry is very uneven, including several stone pillars that have been inserted into it, often not fully, and its counterfort is made of small, irregularly fitted stones. Its interior arrangement, with its spacious upper story, large windows, and westward-facing balcony, suggests a use as a residential tower. Combined, these factors strongly support its traditional identification with the so-called Tower of Isaac Angelos: according to the historian Niketas Choniates, that tower was built by Emperor Isaac II Angelos (r. 1185–1195, 1203–1204) both as a fort and a private residence, and made use of materials from ruined churches. In contrast, the northern tower, which is identified as the Tower of Anemas proper, is a carefully built structure, displaying the typically Byzantine alternating layers of stone masonry and bricks. Its buttress is built of large, regular, carefully fitted blocks. The strength of the walls and the buttresses is explained by considering that this structure formed the westernmost retaining wall of the large terraced hill upon which the late Byzantine Palace of Blachernae was built.

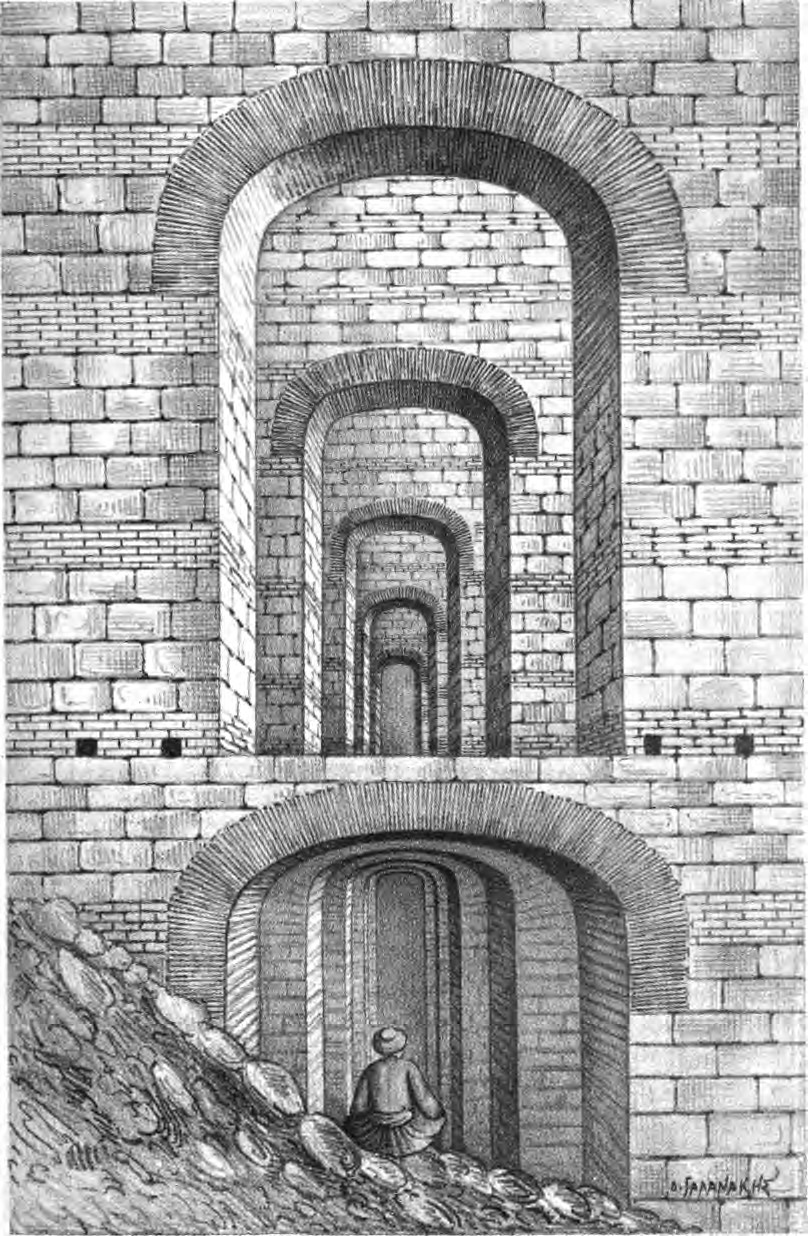
Interior view of the vaulted chambers of the Prison of Anemas, from a 19th-century illustration.

The main structure consists of thirteen transverse buttress-walls, pierced by three superimposed brick arches, which create twelve compartments, each 9–13 m wide. The two lengthwise walls are not parallel, but steadily move apart as they go north. The eastern wall features a pair of superposed corridors on its upper two levels, built inside the wall's body and lit by loopholes in the wall's façades. The basement-level compartments have no windows, but the upper levels are lit through small openings in the western wall. A spiral stairway tower connects the main structure with the two towers.

Inconsistencies in the placement of windows, which are partially covered by later additions, as well as other evidence of successive alterations, show that the structure was built and modified in separate phases. The eastern, city-ward wall came first, as a simple defensive wall with galleries from which arrows and other missiles could be discharged through the loopholes. The rest of the main structure was added later, probably as a strengthened revetment for the palace hill. The role of the compartments is unclear; they have been identified with prison cells, which led to the name "Prison of Anemas" being transferred to the entire structure, but such hypotheses cannot be conclusively proven. It is possible that they functioned as storage rooms or (the upper two levels at least) as barrack rooms.

As for the towers, they are presumed to have been added last, with the southern tower being earlier than the northern one, since they share a wall that manifestly belongs to the former. This, however, throws their identification, respectively as the towers of Isaac Angelos and Anemas, in confusion, since the Tower of Anemas is recorded as extant already in the first years of the 12th century, more than 70 years before the construction of the Tower of Isaac Angelos. Various hypotheses have been introduced to account for this. One theory is that their traditional identification is reversed, or that together they constitute the same building under different names. Another proposes that the actual Tower of Anemas lay further north and was one of the towers of the wall of Heraclius. All theories, however, contain various problems, and the traditional identification remains in standard use today.

== Inmates ==
According to Anna Komnene (The Alexiad, XII.6–7), Michael Anemas was the first man to be imprisoned there, and after him the tower and prison were subsequently named. Michael had conspired against Anna's father, Emperor Alexios I, but the plot was uncovered and he and his fellow conspirators were captured and sentenced to imprisonment and blinding, the usual punishment meted out to traitors. His pleas for mercy, however, as he was being led through the Mese, aroused the sympathy of the people and of Anna herself. Together with her mother, she interceded on his behalf with Alexios. Anemas was indeed shown clemency: he was not blinded, but confined for several years to the tower that was to bear his name. The next prisoner arrived at the tower even before Anemas was finally pardoned and released. It was Gregory Taronites, the doux of Chaldia, the region around Trebizond. Taking advantage of his province's relative isolation, he had tried to make himself an independent ruler in 1104. Even after his capture, however, according to the Alexiad, he remained defiant, leading to a long period of incarceration before he was finally released and pardoned.

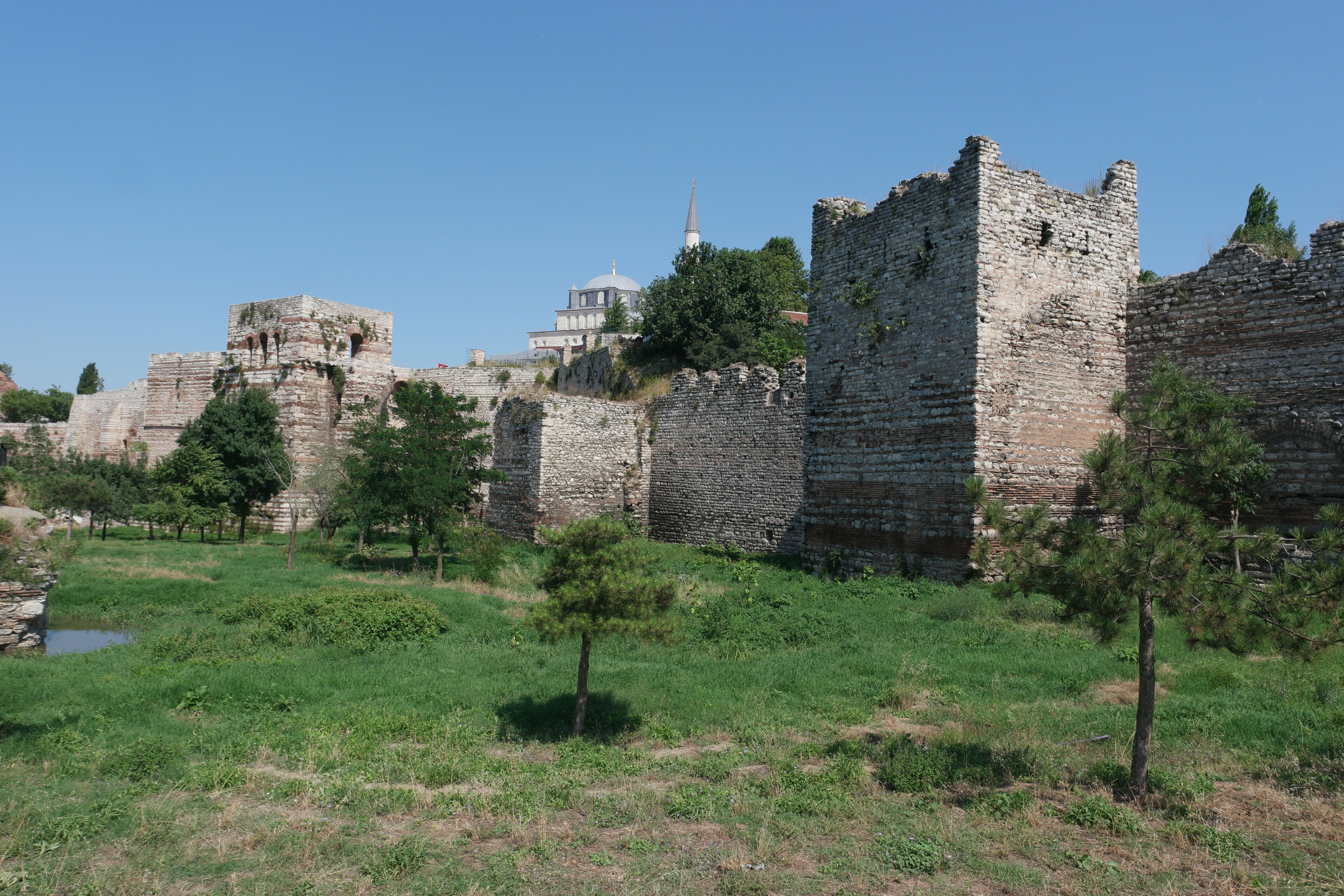
The Prison of Anemas seen from outside of the fortification walls of Constantinople

The next inmate was the deposed Emperor Andronikos I Komnenos (r. 1183–1185), who was imprisoned there on the eve of his public execution in the Hippodrome of Constantinople, on September 12, 1185. The next known prisoner was John Bekkos, then the chartophylax of the Hagia Sophia and future Patriarch of Constantinople as John XI, who was imprisoned there for opposing Emperor Michael VIII Palaiologos's (r. 1259–1282) intended reunion of the Eastern Orthodox and Roman Catholic Churches. In 1322, Syrgiannes Palaiologos, who conspired both with and against Emperor Andronikos II Palaiologos (r. 1282–1328) and his grandson and opponent Andronikos III (r. 1328–1341) in their civil war, was imprisoned here, albeit in rather comfortable conditions, before being pardoned and restored to his offices in 1328.

The prison was once again in demand in the dynastic conflicts of the Palaiologoi during the 1370s. Emperor John V Palaiologos (r. 1341–1376, 1379–1391) imprisoned his eldest son, Andronikos IV, here after a failed rebellion. Andronikos, however, escaped, and with Genoese and Ottoman aid, he managed to usurp the throne from his father for three years (1376–1379). During this time, John V and his younger sons, Manuel – the future Emperor Manuel II (r. 1391–1425) – and Theodore, were imprisoned in the Anemas Prison.

== Sources ==
- Kazhdan, Alexander Petrovich, ed. (1991). The Oxford Dictionary of Byzantium. New York, New York and Oxford, United Kingdom: Oxford University Press. ISBN 978-0-19-504652-6.
- Turnbull, Stephen; Dennis, Peter (2004). The Walls of Constantinople AD 324–1453 (Fortress 25). Oxford, United Kingdom: Osprey Publishing Limited. ISBN 1-84176-759-X.
- van Millingen, Alexander (1899). Byzantine Constantinople: The Walls of the City and Adjoining Historical Sites. London, United Kingdom: John Murray.
