= Miroslava of Bulgaria =

Bulgarian-Byzantine noblewoman

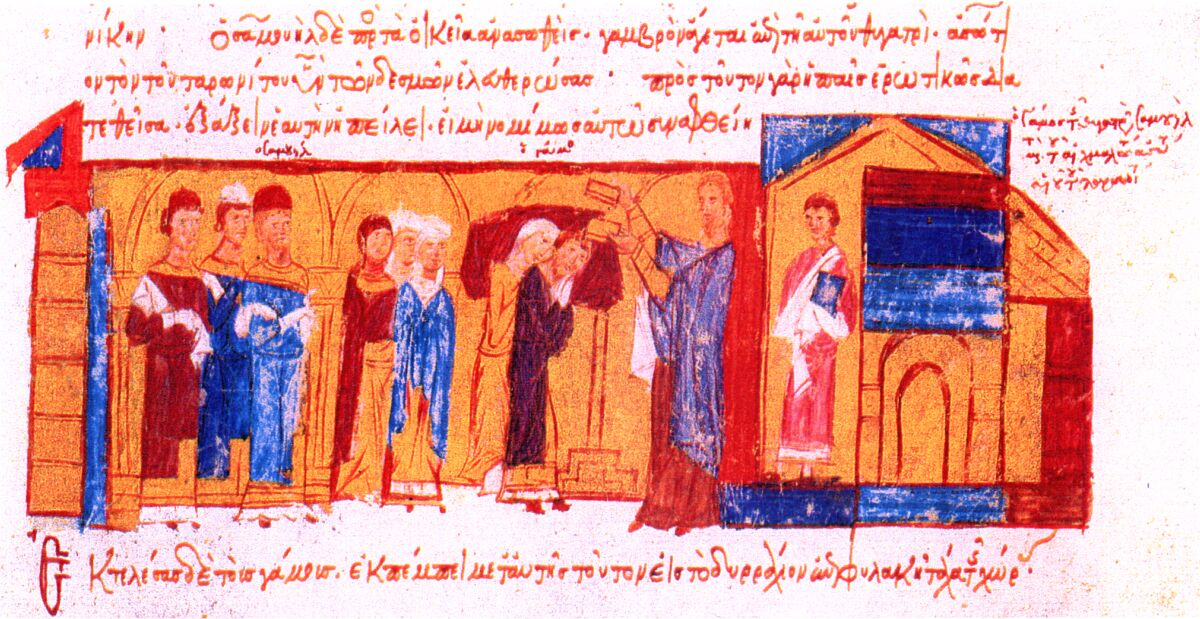
The wedding of Miroslava and Ashot.

Miroslava (Bulgarian: Мирослава) (fl. c. 1000 CE) was a Bulgarian-Byzantine noblewoman. She was the wife of Ashot Taronites, and daughter of tsar Samuil of Bulgaria and Agatha.

According to the Synopsis of History written by near-contemporary chronicler John Scylitzes, Miroslava fell in love with Ashot Taronites, a Byzantine noble of Armenian origin who was being held captive by her father, Samuil of Bulgaria. John Scylitzes claims that Miroslava told her father that she would commit suicide if she was not allowed to marry Ashot. Her father conceded, and appointed Ashot governor of Dyrrhachium. Miroslava and Ashot married in 996 CE.

Later Ashot made contact with the local Byzantines and the influential John Chryselios, Samuel's father-in-law. Ashot and Miroslava boarded one of the Byzantine ships that were beleaguering the town and fled to Constantinople, where the Emperor Basil II granted Ashot the title of magistros and Miroslava, the title of zoste patrikia (lady-in-waiting).
