= John Chaldos =

Byzantine general (fl. 995–1030)

- Native name: Ἰωάννης Χάλδος
- Allegiance: Byzantine Empire
- Service years: before 995 – after 1030
- Rank: strategos
- Conflicts: Byzantine–Bulgarian wars, Arab–Byzantine frontier wars

John Chaldos (Greek: Ἰωάννης Χάλδος; fl. 995–1030) was a Byzantine general and provincial governor during the reign of Emperor Basil II. A native of Chaldia, he served as strategos of the Armeniac and Bucellarian themes before becoming dux of Thessalonica around 995. Soon after taking up the post he was captured in a Bulgarian ambush and spent 22 years in captivity, being released only after the Byzantine conquest of Bulgaria in 1018.

Chaldos later reappears during Emperor Romanos III Argyros' campaign against the Mirdasid emirate of Aleppo in 1030, where he advised against the expedition that ended in the Byzantine defeat at Azaz.

== Life ==
Map of the Byzantine themes in Asia Minor around 1025, showing Chaldia, the Armeniac Theme and the Bucellarian Theme, the provinces in which John Chaldos served as strategos

As his surname indicates, Chaldos was native of Chaldia, a region in northeastern Asia Minor. He may have been of Armenian origin.

He served as military governor (strategos) of the Armeniac and Bucellarian themes in Asia Minor, before being sent to Thessalonica as doux in c. 995, in succession to Gregory Taronites, who had been killed in a Bulgarian ambush. Alternatively, he may have held all three offices concurrently, despite their wide geographic separation. He was certainly at his post as governor of Thessalonica in September 995, for he issued an act (sigillion) confirming various privileges and exemptions of the Kolobou Monastery at Ierissos on Chalcidice, which survives to this day.

Soon after, in early 996, he was captured by the Bulgarians in another ambush placed by Tsar Samuel of Bulgaria. He remained in Bulgarian captivity for 22 years, until the final collapse of Bulgarian resistance in 1018, when he was released upon the surrender of Dragomouzos, the Bulgarian governor of Strumitza, to Emperor Basil II. Following the death of Taronites and the capture of Chaldos, Basil II appointed one of his most trusted subordinates, Nikephoros Ouranos, as commander-in-chief in the Balkans, resulting in the crushing victory over Samuel and his army at the Battle of Spercheios.

John Chaldos is mentioned next, and for the last time, during the 1030 campaign by Emperor Romanos III Argyros against the Mirdasids of Aleppo, which he advised against. The Emperor did not heed his opinion, and the campaign ended in a humiliating defeat in the Battle of Azaz.

== Sources ==
- Charanis, Peter (1963). The Armenians in the Byzantine Empire. Lisbon: Fundação Calouste Gulbenkian Armenian Library. OCLC 17186882.
- Holmes, Catherine (2005). Basil II and the Governance of Empire (976–1025). Oxford: Oxford University Press. ISBN 978-0-19-927968-5.
- Lilie, Ralph-Johannes; Ludwig, Claudia; Pratsch, Thomas; Zielke, Beate (2013). Prosopographie der mittelbyzantinischen Zeit Online. Berlin-Brandenburgische Akademie der Wissenschaften. Nach Vorarbeiten F. Winkelmanns erstellt (in German). Berlin and Boston: De Gruyter.
- Stephenson, Paul (2003). The Legend of Basil the Bulgar-Slayer. New York: Cambridge University Press. ISBN 0-521-81530-4.
- Strässle, Paul Meinrad (2006). Krieg und Kriegführung in Byzanz: die Kriege Kaiser Basileios' II. gegen die Bulgaren (976–1019) (in German). Cologne: Böhlau Verlag. ISBN 3-412-17405-X.

Preceded by Gregory Taronites	Governor (doux) of Thessalonica; 995–996	Succeeded by Nikephoros Ouranos
