= Ashot III of Taron =

10th-century Armenian ruler

Ashot III (Greek: Ἀσώτιος, Asotios; Arabic: Ashūṭ ibn Ghirghūr and Ibn Ṭurnīq; fl. c. 900–967) was the last independent ruler of the southern Armenian region of Taron from c. 940 until his death in 967.

Ashot was a natural son of Grigor I of Taron and half-brother of Bagrat II of Taron. The family were a branch of the Bagratid dynasty. Little is known about his early life. According to the De administrando imperio of the Byzantine emperor Constantine VII Porphyrogennetos (r. 913–959), in his youth he visited Constantinople and received the title of protospatharios, an event dated by the historian and genealogist Cyril Toumanoff to c. 900. A second visit, dated by Toumanoff to c. 920, resulted in the award of the title of patrikios. After Grigor I's death (sometime between 923 and 936), Ashot and his half-brother Bagrat assumed the rulership, but their power was limited to only part of Taron: about a half was controlled by their cousin Tornikes, the son of their uncle Abu Ghanim, who also held the title of patrikios. A struggle erupted between the cousins, forcing Tornikes to will his lands over to the Byzantine emperor, Romanos I Lekapenos (r. 920–944). When Tornikes died, Romanos sent envoys to take over the territories promised, but Ashot and Bagrat managed to persuade the emperor to leave Tornikes' lands to them in exchange for the fortress of Olnutin.

By 940, Bagrat II had died and Ashot reigned as sole prince of Taron. In that year, the Hamdanid prince Sayf al-Dawla invaded Armenia. The Arab historian Ibn Zafir records that Sayf al-Dawla devastated Taron and besieged its capital, Mush. Eventually Ashot—whom Ibn Zafir calls the "King of Armenia and Georgia"—was compelled to do him homage, surrender the towns of Sasun and Qulb, and acknowledge his suzerainty at Tadvan near Lake Van. Ashot continued to rule over Taron until his death in late summer or early fall of 967 (dated by some earlier historians to 966). After his death, his sons Grigor and Bagrat surrendered the principality to the Byzantines and entered Byzantine service themselves, founding the noble family of the Taronitai.

== Sources ==
- Kazhdan, Alexander (1991). "Taronites". In Kazhdan, Alexander (ed.). The Oxford Dictionary of Byzantium. Oxford and New York: Oxford University Press. pp. 2012–2013. ISBN 0-19-504652-8.
- Lilie, Ralph-Johannes; Ludwig, Claudia; Pratsch, Thomas; Zielke, Beate (2013). Prosopographie der mittelbyzantinischen Zeit Online. Berlin-Brandenburgische Akademie der Wissenschaften. Nach Vorarbeiten F. Winkelmanns erstellt (in German). Berlin and Boston: De Gruyter.
