= Gregory Taronites =

Armenian prince of Taron

- Գրիգոր Տարոնիտես
- The death of Gregory Taronites from the Madrid Skylitzes

Magistros
- Doux of Thessaloniki c. 988–c. 991/5
- Monarchs: Basil II & Constantine VIII
- Succeeded by: John Chaldos

Patrikios
- Monarchs: Nikephoros II Phokas; John I Tzimiskes

Personal details
- Born: c. 940
- Died: c. 991/5 Thessaloniki
- Children: Ashot Taronites
- Parent: Ashot III of Taron

Military service
- Allegiance: Byzantine empire
- Years of service: 967/8–991/5
- Battles/wars: Rebellion of Bardas Skleros; Byzantine–Bulgarian wars

Gregory Taronites (Greek: Γρηγόριος Ταρωνίτης, romanized: Grēgorios Tarōnitēs; Armenian: Գրիգոր Տարոնիտես) was an Armenian prince of Taron, who went over to Byzantine service and held senior commands and governorships under Emperor Basil II. He was killed by the Bulgarians at an ambush near Thessalonica ca. 991 or 995.

== Life ==
Gregory was a son of Ashot III, prince of the region of Taron in southern Armenia. At Ashot's death in 967/8, Gregory and his brother, Bagrat (Pankratios in Greek) ceded Taron to the Byzantine Empire in exchange for extensive lands inside the Empire and the title of patrikios.

The two brothers became involved in the civil wars between Emperor Basil II (r. 976–1025) and the mighty military aristocracy of Asia Minor, led by Bardas Phokas the Younger and Bardas Skleros. When Skleros rebelled in 976, they initially supported him, but soon switched over to the Emperor's side. In 988/9, during the revolt of Bardas Phokas, according to the historian Yahya of Antioch, Gregory, by now a magistros, was sent to recruit an army at Trebizond and lead it against Phokas. He was defeated en route by Phokas' son Nikephoros and his allies, the Iberians sent by David of Tao.

Byzantine Greece in the 10th century

Following the suppression of the magnates' revolts, Basil II turned his attention to the Balkans, where Samuel of Bulgaria was menacing the Byzantine territories. In 991 he campaigned in Macedonia and captured the fortress of Berroia, before returning to Constantinople. The emperor left Gregory Taronites in charge of the Balkan army and tasked him with stopping Samuel's raids. Taronites was named doux and made Thessalonica his seat. It is unclear whether in this context the title of doux implies simply a military command over the troops entrusted to him by the emperor, or, as it is usually interpreted, whether it includes the governorship of the theme of Thessalonica as well, which was previously held by a strategos.

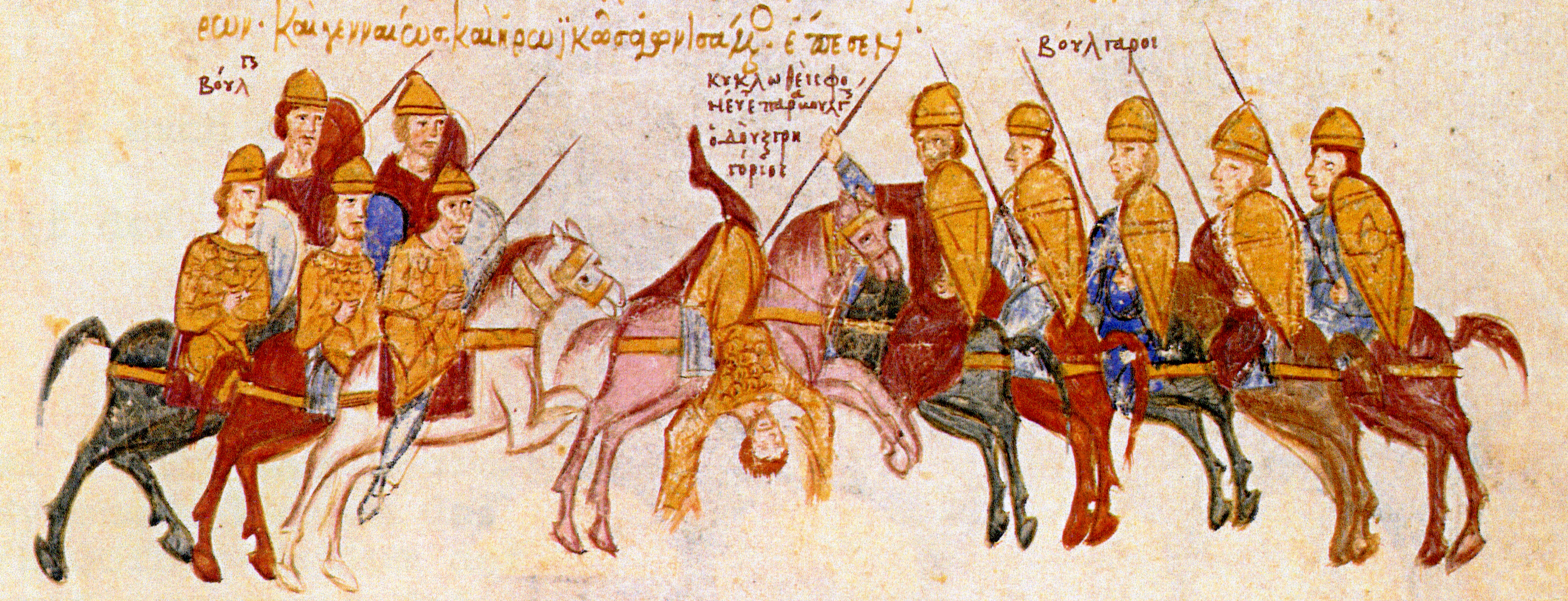
The death of Gregory Taronites in the Bulgarian ambush, miniature from the Madrid Skylitzes

Some time after his appointment, Gregory Taronites was killed by the Bulgarians in an ambush near Thessalonica. A raiding party had approached the city, and Gregory sent out his son, Ashot, with the vanguard to make contact with them and reconnoitre. The over-eager Ashot engaged the Bulgarians and drove them back, but was drawn into a prepared ambush and encircled with his men. His father, following up with the main Byzantine force, rushed to his rescue, but was killed. The exact date of this event is unknown. The chronology of the account of John Skylitzes seems to place it in 996, while Armenian sources place it in 991. Modern research holds that it must have happened at the latest in mid-995, as John Chaldos is attested as doux of Thessalonica later in the same year.

== Family ==
Along with his brother, Gregory was the founder of the noble Taronites family, which remained prominent in Byzantium until the end of the 12th century. Gregory's son Ashot was captured by the Bulgarians, but ended up marrying Samuel's daughter Miroslava and becoming governor of Dyrrhachium, which he soon surrendered back to the Byzantines. Gregory had at least another child, a daughter Irene, who was wed to Romanos Saronites.

== Sources ==
- Holmes, Catherine (2005). Basil II and the Governance of Empire (976–1025). Oxford: Oxford University Press. ISBN 978-0-19-927968-5.
- Kazhdan, Alexander (1991). "Taronites". In Kazhdan, Alexander (ed.). The Oxford Dictionary of Byzantium. Oxford and New York: Oxford University Press. pp. 2012–2013. ISBN 0-19-504652-8.
- Lilie, Ralph-Johannes; Ludwig, Claudia; Pratsch, Thomas; Zielke, Beate (2013). Prosopographie der mittelbyzantinischen Zeit Online. Berlin-Brandenburgische Akademie der Wissenschaften. Nach Vorarbeiten F. Winkelmanns erstellt (in German). Berlin and Boston: De Gruyter.
- Strässle, Paul Meinrad (2006). Krieg und Kriegführung in Byzanz: die Kriege Kaiser Basileios' II. gegen die Bulgaren (976–1019) (in German). Cologne: Böhlau Verlag. ISBN 3-412-17405-X.

Unknown	Governor (doux) of Thessalonica; 991–ca. 995	Succeeded by John Chaldos
