= Anagrapheus =

Byzantine fiscal office

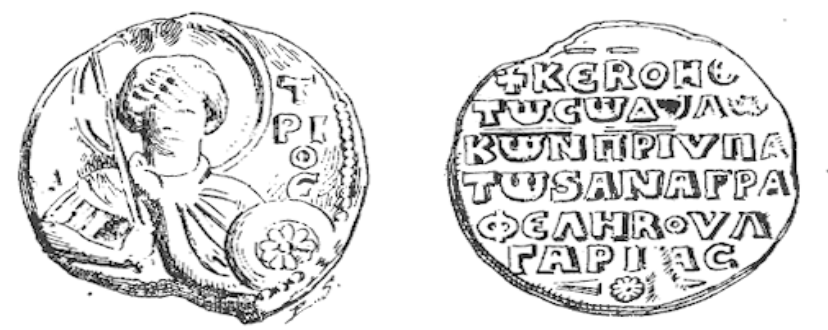
Seal of Constantine, patrikios, hypatos, and anagrapheus of Bulgaria

Anagrapheus (Greek: ἀναγραφεύς) was a Byzantine fiscal official in the 9th–12th centuries.

The title does not appear in the lists of offices (taktika), but is attested on seals and monastic charters, with the first occurrence ca. 750–850, and the last secured mention in 1189. Franz Dölger thought that the office continued in existence until 1204, after which it was replaced by the apographeus. The duties of the office were related with the revision of the cadaster; each anagrapheus was usually assigned to a particular theme. According to the Oxford Dictionary of Byzantium, its "functions were hardly distinguishable from those of the epoptes".

== Sources ==
- Kazhdan, Alexander (1991). "Anagrapheus". In Kazhdan, Alexander (ed.). The Oxford Dictionary of Byzantium. Oxford and New York: Oxford University Press. p. 84. ISBN 0-19-504652-8.
