= Battle of Spercheios =

997 battle of the Byzantine-Bulgarian Wars

- Part of the Byzantine–Bulgarian wars
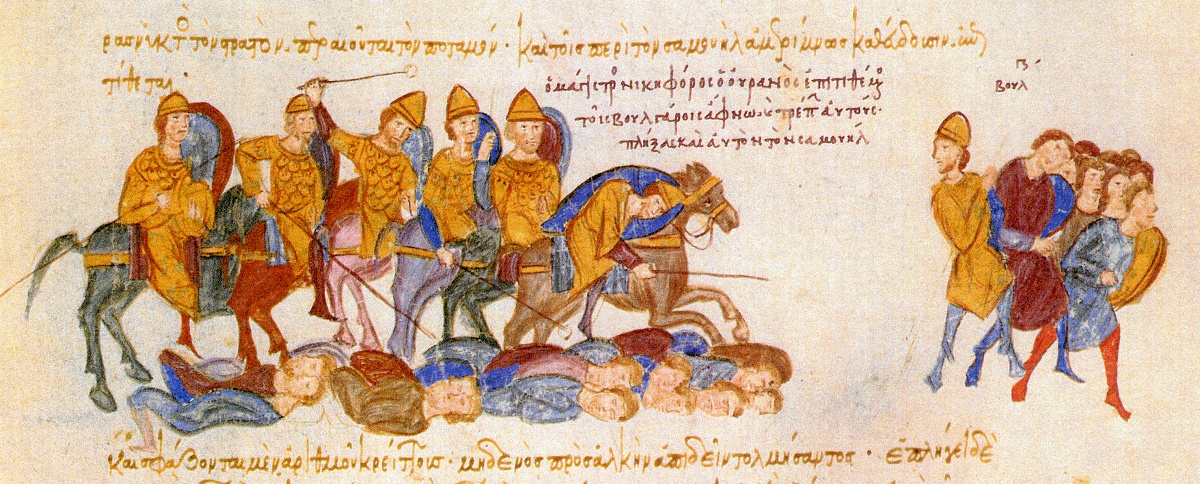
- Bulgarians put to flight by Ouranos at the Spercheios River from the Chronicle of John Skylitzes
Date	16 July 997
Location	Spercheios river, Greece
Result	Byzantine victory

Belligerents
Bulgarian Empire	Byzantine Empire

Commanders and leaders
Samuil of Bulgaria (WIA); Gavril Radomir	Nikephoros Ouranos

Casualties and losses
Devastating, ~12,000 captured	unknown

The Battle of Spercheios (Bulgarian: Битка при Сперхей, Greek: Μάχη του Σπερχειού) took place in 997 AD, on the shores of the Spercheios river near the city of Lamia in central Greece. It was fought between a Bulgarian army led by Tsar Samuil, which in the previous year had penetrated south into Greece, and a Byzantine army under the command of General Nikephoros Ouranos. The Byzantine victory virtually destroyed the Bulgarian army, and ended its raids in the southern Balkans and Greece. The major historical source on the battle comes from Greek historian John Skylitzes whose Synopsis of Histories (Σύνοψις Ἱστοριῶν) contains a biography of the then-reigning Byzantine emperor, Basil II.

== Historical background ==
After the success of the Bulgarians in the Battle of the Gates of Trajan in 986, Byzantium descended into a civil war, further exacerbated by the conflict with the Fatimids in Syria. Tsar Samuil took advantage of the situation. He managed to seize many castles in the surroundings of Byzantium's second largest city, Thessalonica. In 991, the Byzantines managed to capture Roman of Bulgaria but this did not stop Samuil who was now de facto the only emperor of Bulgaria. In 996, Samuil defeated the forces of the strategos of Thessalonica and marched south, eventually threatening Larissa and Corinth.

== Battle ==
On his way back, Samuil met a Byzantine army on the opposite side of the Spercheios river, led by the Domestic of the West, Nikephoros Ouranos. Basil II had appointed Ouranos commander of all Balkan and Greek territories of the Byzantine Empire and gave him a large army to defeat the Bulgarians. He followed the Bulgarian army and confronted it after the Bulgarians went through the Thermopylae pass on the river of Spercheios.

After heavy rainfalls, the river had swollen and flooded a large area on both shores. The Bulgarians camped on the southern shore and the Byzantines on the northern, separated from each other by the river. The two armies remained thus encamped for several days. Samuil was confident that the Byzantines could not cross, and neglected taking measures to protect his camp. Ouranos however, sought and found a ford, led his army across during the night, and attacked the Bulgarians at dawn. The Bulgarians were not able to put up effective resistance, and the larger part of their army was destroyed and captured. Samuil himself was wounded and he and his son Gavril Radomir evaded capture by feigning death among the bodies of their slain soldiers, while around 12,000 of their men were said to be captured. After nightfall they set off to Bulgaria and in the Pindus mountains gathered what was left of their army. Over the difficult 400 km journey to Ochrid, his arm healed at an angle of 140°. According to Yahya of Antioch, Nikephoros Ouranos returned to Constantinople with one thousand heads of Bulgarian soldiers and twelve thousand captives.

== Aftermath ==
The battle was a major defeat of the Bulgarian army. At first Samuil showed readiness for negotiations but upon the news of the death of Bulgaria's official ruler Roman in prison, he proclaimed himself the sole legitimate tsar and continued the war. Although Samuil initially managed to recover, the Byzantines decisively took the lead in the war. In 1014, they decisively defeated the Bulgarians and conquered the country in the battles of Thessalonica and Kleidion. According to Skylitzes, the victory was entirely Ouranos's achievement, and Basil II is credited with little besides appointing him to the office of domesticos.
