= Panhypersebastos =

Byzantine Court Title

The title of panhypersebastos (Greek: πανυπερσέβαστος, lit. 'venerable above all') was a Byzantine court title created by Alexios I Komnenos (r. 1081–1118) using the imperial root sebastos (the Greek translation of Augustus). It was always conferred to members of aristocratic families closely allied to the imperial family.

Michael Taronites, Alexios I's brother-in-law, was first awarded this title and regarded as almost equal to a Caesar. Under the Komnenian emperors, panhypersebastos was one of the titles accorded to the emperor's sons-in-law (gambroi): the husband of the eldest daughter received the title of Caesar, the husband of the second daughter became panhypersebastos, and those of the third and fourth received the titles of protosebastohypertatos and sebastohypertatos respectively.

The title remained very important through to the Palaiologan era, coming right after the Caesar, but under Andronikos III Palaiologos (r. 1328–1341), when the future emperor John VI Kantakouzenos was named megas domestikos, the latter office was raised above the panhypersebastos.

According to Pseudo-Kodinos, writing after the middle of the 14th century, the panhypersebastos was distinguished by the yellow colour of his clothing: his shoes, his mantle (tamparion), as well as his saddle, were all yellow, decorated with gold braid. Otherwise his costume resembled that of the megas domestikos, i.e., a skiadion hat in red and gold, decorated with embroideries in the klapoton style, with a veil and pendants in the same style. Alternatively, a domed skaranikon hat could be worn, again in red and gold, with a portrait of the emperor, standing crowned and flanked by angels, within a circle of pearls, in front. The skaranikon itself was also bordered with pearls. A rich silk tunic, the kabbadion, of two colours, decorated with stripes of gold braid, was also worn, and the staff of office (dikanikion) featured carved knobs, with the first of plain gold, the second of gold bordered with silver braid, the third like the first, the fourth like the second, etc.

== Sources ==
- Kazhdan, Alexander, ed. (1991). The Oxford Dictionary of Byzantium. Oxford and New York: Oxford University Press. ISBN 0-19-504652-8.
- Magdalino, Paul (2002) [1993]. The Empire of Manuel I Komnenos, 1143–1180. Cambridge: Cambridge University Press. ISBN 0-521-52653-1.
- Nicol, Donald (1984). "The Prosopography of the Byzantine Aristocracy". In Angold, Michael (ed.). The Byzantine Aristocracy, IX to XIII Centuries. Oxford: B.A.R. ISBN 0-86054-283-1.
- Stiernon, Lucien (1965). "Notes de titulature et de prosopographie byzantines: Sébaste et gambros". Revue des études byzantines. 23: 222–243. doi:10.3406/rebyz.1965.1349.
- Verpeaux, Jean, ed. (1966). Pseudo-Kodinos, Traité des Offices (in French). Centre National de la Recherche Scientifique.
