= Taron (historic Armenia) =

Region of ancient Armenia

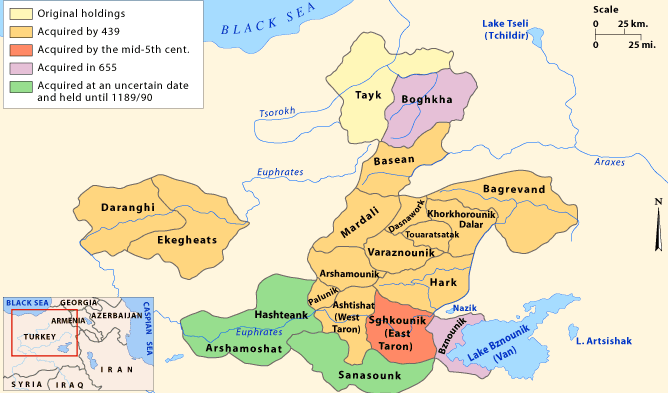
The expansion of the House of Mamikonians.

Taron (Armenian: Տարօն; Western Armenian pronunciation: Daron; Greek: Ταρών, Tarōn; Latin: Taraunitis) was a canton of the Turuberan province of Greater Armenia, roughly corresponding to the Muş Province of modern Turkey.

== Early Middle Ages ==
The main source on the principality's history during the Early Middle Ages is the History of Taron, a relatively short "historical" romance in five parts, purporting to describe significant events occurring in the district of Taron during the Byzantine–Sassanid Wars when the Sassanid emperor was Khosrau II (590-628). During Khosrau's reign, Taron was frequently invaded by the Persians. The History describes the actions of five generations of Mamikonians (Taron's princely house), in defending and avenging the district. Each section or cycle of the story is devoted to the exploits of one of the defenders: Mushegh, Vahan, Smbat, his son Vahan Kamsarakan, and the latter's son Tiran. The heroes are at times superhumanly brave or duplicitous, wise or cunning, humble or bombastic, humane or brutally merciless as the situation requires. Above all, they are the holy warriors of St. Karapet (John the Baptist, their patron saint), and they zealously defend the Saint Karapet Monastery (Glakavank) as well as all the churches and Christians in the district. Much of the narration describes battles fought and the cunning tactics used by the Taronites to defeat the invading Iranians.

== Later history ==
With the death of Mushegh VI Mamikonian at the Battle of Bagrevand in April 775, and the eclipse of the Mamikonian from Armenian affairs, and following a conflict with the Jahhafids, Taron passed to Ashot Msaker of the Bagratuni family. His successors ruled Taron until 967:

- Ashot I Msaker (died 826), ca. 813–826, presiding prince of Armenia (as Ashot IV) from 806
- Bagrat I (died after 851), 826–851, presiding prince of Armenia (as Bagrat II) after 830
- Ashot II (ca. 835 – 878), after 851–878
- David (ca. 840 – 895), 878–895 (brother of Ashot II)
- Gurgen (murdered 895/6), 895/6 (son of Ashot II)
- Taron seized by Ahmad ibn Isa al-Shaybani, 895/6–898
- Grigor I (died 923/36), 898–923/936 (cousin of Gurgen)
- Bagrat II (died before 940) and Ashot III (died 967), 898–967

Upon the death of Ashot III in 967, his two sons, Grigor II (Gregory Taronites) and Bagrat III (Pankratios Taronites), ceded the principality to the Byzantine Empire in exchange for lands and noble titles. In Byzantium, probably along with other branches of their family already established there in previous decades, they formed the Taronites family, which was one of the senior Byzantine noble families during the 11th–12th centuries. Under Byzantine rule, Taron was united with the district of Keltzene into a single province (theme), whose governor (strategos or doux) usually bore the rank of protospatharios. In the middle of the 11th century, it was united with the theme of Vaspurakan under a single governor. Taron also became a metropolitan see with 21 suffragan sees. Following the Byzantine defeat in the Battle of Manzikert against the Seljuk Turks in 1071, an independent Armenian lord named Tornik seized power in Taron, with Muş as his capital. Tornik established a principality which held out as ruler of Taron until overrun by the Turks in 1189/90.
