= John Skylitzes =

Greek historian (early 1040s – after 1101)

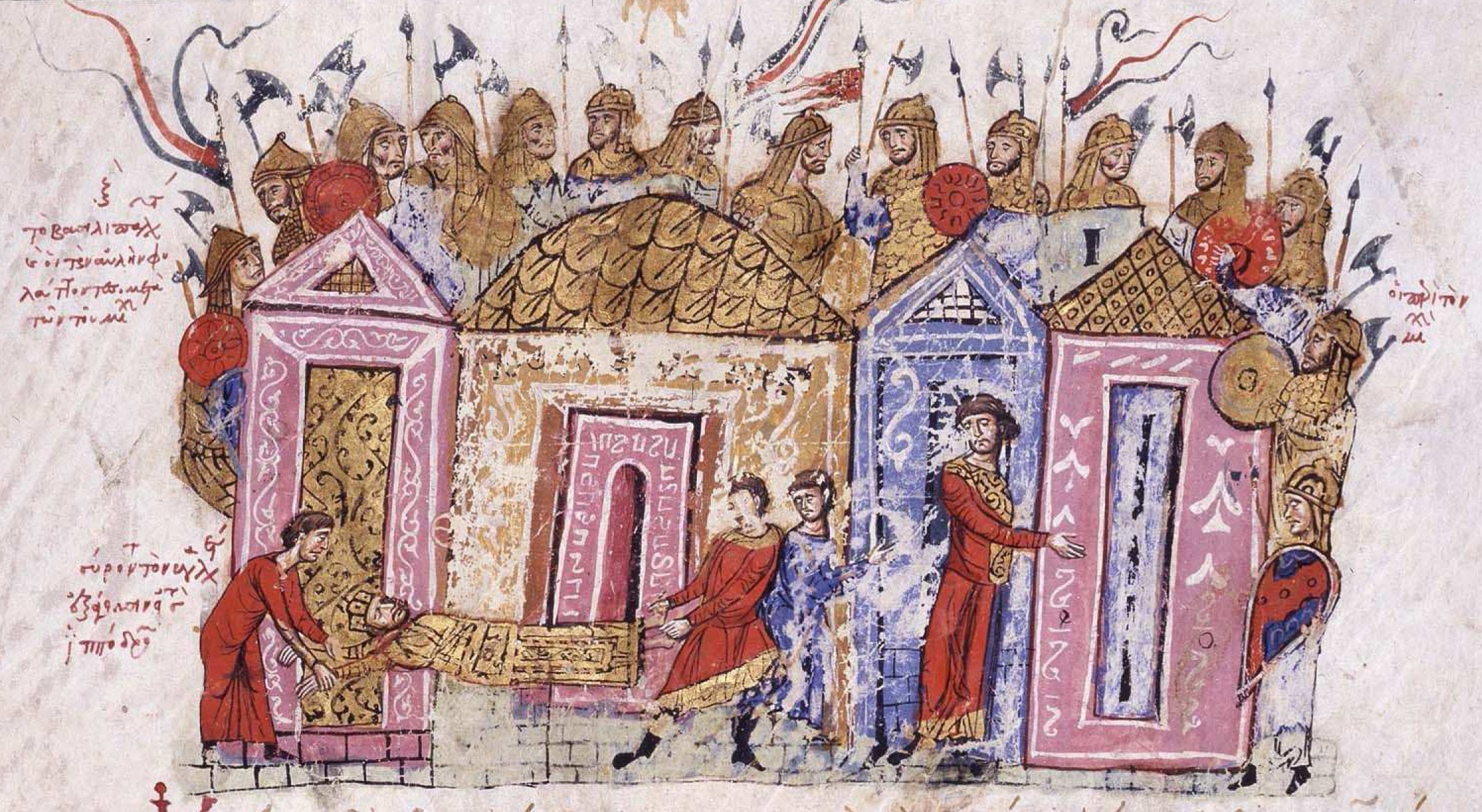
Varangian Guardsmen, an illumination from the 11th century chronicle of John Skylitzes.

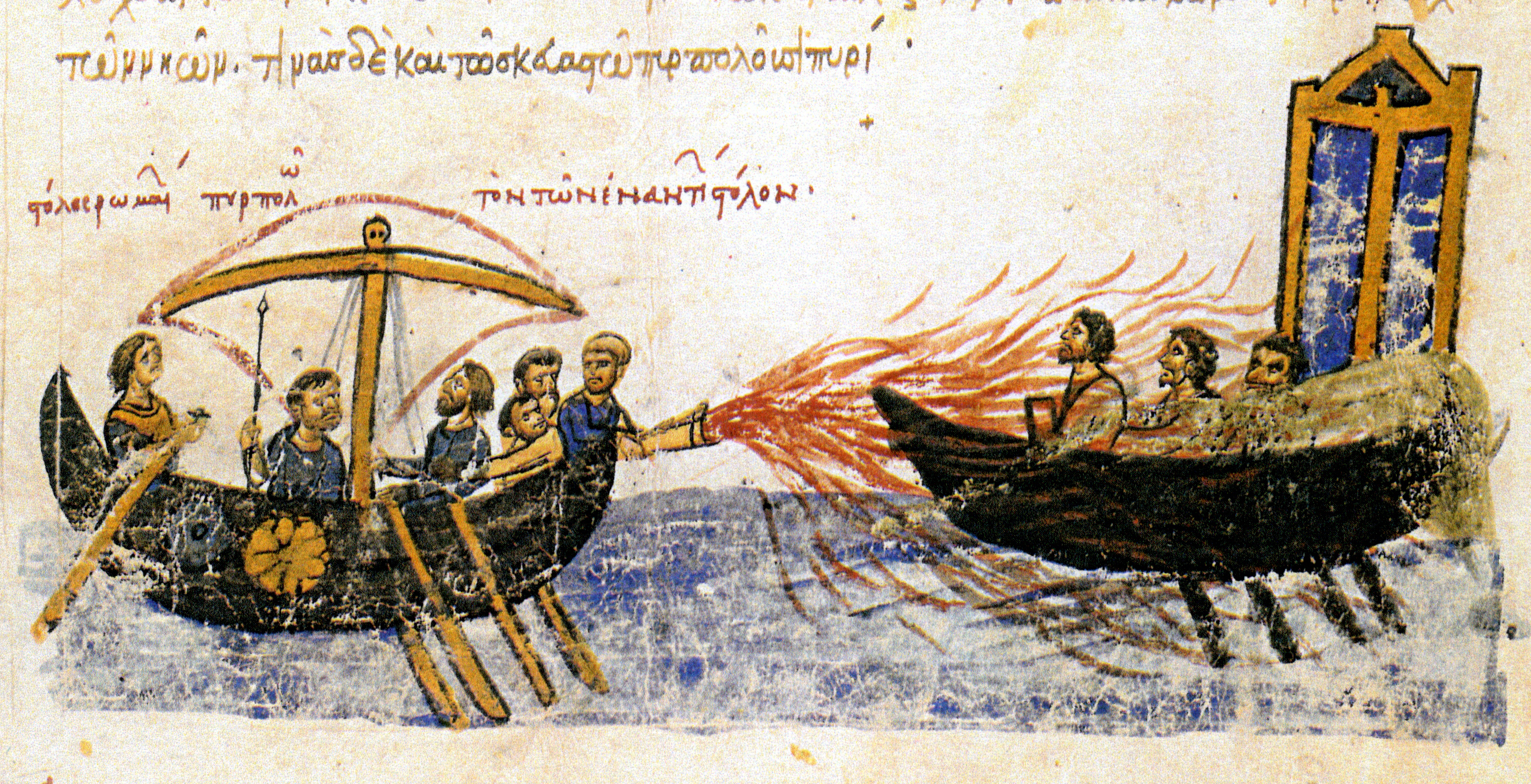
Depiction of Greek fire in the Madrid Skylitzes

John Skylitzes, commonly Latinized as Ioannes (Note: Alternate Latinized forms in common use include Joannes, Johannes, Iōannēs) Scylitzes (Greek: Ἰωάννης Σκυλίτζης, romanized: Iōánnēs Skylítzēs, (Note: Also rendered in Greek as Σκυλλίτζης, Skyllítzēs or Σκυλίτσης, Skylítsēs or Σκυλίτση, Skylítsē) Byzantine Greek: [ioˈanis sciˈlit.sis]; Latin: Ioannes Scyllitzes, (Note: Also rendered in Latin as Scylitia [skiˈliːtsi.a], Scylitza [skiˈlit.tsa], or Schillizzi [skilˈlit.tsi]) Latin: [jɔˈannes skilˈlit.dzes]; early 1040s – after 1101), was a Byzantine historian of the late 11th century.

== Life ==
Very little is known about his life. The title of his work records him as a kouropalatēs and a former droungarios of the Vigla, whereby he is usually identified with a certain John Thrakesios.

His major work is the Synopsis of Histories (Greek: Σύνοψις Ἱστοριῶν [ˈsy̜.nop.sis is.to.riˈon]), which covers the reigns of the Byzantine emperors from the death of Nikephoros I in 811 to the deposition of Michael VI in 1057; it continues the chronicle of Theophanes the Confessor. There is a continuation of this work, known as Scylitzes Continuatus, covering 1057 to 1079; some historians hypothesize that it was also written by Skylitzes.

== The Madrid Skylitzes ==
The most famous manuscript of the Synopsis was produced in Sicily in the 12th century known as the Madrid Skylitzes (Latin: Skyllitzes Matritensis, [sk̟ilˈlit̪.d͡ze̝s ma.t̪riˈt̪ɛn.sis]), and is now at the Biblioteca Nacional de España in Madrid. It features 574 miniatures, while some 100 have been lost, and is the only surviving Byzantine illuminated chronicle in Greek, providing an invaluable primary source for the visualization of contemporary Byzantium.

== Sources ==
- AHRB Skylitzes Colloquium, Belfast, 21–22 September 2002, Institute for Byzantine Studies, Queen's University, Belfast.
- Flusin, B. (trans.), J.-C. Cheynet (ed.), Jean Skylitzès: Empereurs de Constantinople, Ed. Lethielleux, 2004, ISBN 2-283-60459-1.
- Kazhdan, Alexander, ed. (1991). Oxford Dictionary of Byzantium. Oxford University Press. p. 1914. ISBN 978-0-19-504652-6.
- Kiapidou, Eirini-Sophia. Ἡ Σύνοψη Ἱστοριῶν τοῦ Ἰωάννη Σκυλίτζη καὶ οἱ πηγές της (811‐1057). Συμβολὴ στὴ βυζαντινὴ ἱστοριογραφία κατὰ τὸν ΙΑ΄ αἰώνα, Athens 2010.
- Seibt, Werner (1976). "Iohannes Skylitzes. Zur Person des Chronisten". Jahrbuch der Österreichischen Byzantinistik (in German). 25: 81–85.
- Thurn, Hans, ed. (1973). Ioannis Scylitzae Synopsis historiarum. Berlin-New York: De Gruyter. ISBN 9783110022858.

The Thurn edition supersedes the much older one by Migne. A popular edition is being prepared for Kanakis books (with parallel Modern Greek translation) and a facsimile edition of the Madrid is also available from Militos (Μίλητος) Publishers.

- Wortley, John (trans.). A Synopsis of Byzantine History, 811–1057 (by John Scylitzes, active 1081), Cambridge University Press, 2010.
