= Karayazıcı =

Ottoman rebel (c. 1554 – 1602)

Karayazıcı Abdülhalim
- Nickname: Black Scribe
- Born: c. 1554 Urfa, Ottoman Empire
- Died: 1602 (aged 47–48) Canik Mountains, Ottoman Empire
- Allegiance: Celali movement

Karayazici (Ottoman Turkish: قره یازجی, romanized: Karayazıcı, lit. 'The Black Scribe'; c. 1554 – c. 1602), also known by his first name Abdülhalim (Ottoman Turkish: عبد الحلیم, romanized: ʿAbd al-Ḥalīm), was a leader of the Celali rebellions in the late 16th century Ottoman Empire. His nickname originated from his role as a sekban scribe. He is recognized as the first Celali leader to declare sovereignty in Anatolia, under the title Halim Shah.

== Early life and military career ==
Abdülhalim was a member of the Kılıçlı tribe in the Urfa region. His father's name was Ali. However, Arakel Tavrizetsi noted him as a son of a Turk from Çorum. He was described by he Venetian consul in Aleppo, Vincenzio Dandolo as "short, with black skin, and a lame left hand." He started his career as a subashi in Divrik. During the Long Turkish War, a period of instability in Anatolia, he joined the kapıkulu (imperial cavalry). While serving, he was sent to guard either Damascus or another frontier fortress. Later, he returned to Malatya, where he was appointed yiğitbaşı, the head of the regional militia. His position in the imperial cavalry eventually led to his appointment as kaymakam (deputy governor) of a sanjak. During his time as a kaymakam, Karayazıcı gathered patrol units composed of levends (irregular soldiers). Despite his sanjak being reassigned to another official, Karayazıcı refused to relinquish control and killed the governor sent to replace him, marking the beginning of his rebellion.

== Rebellion ==
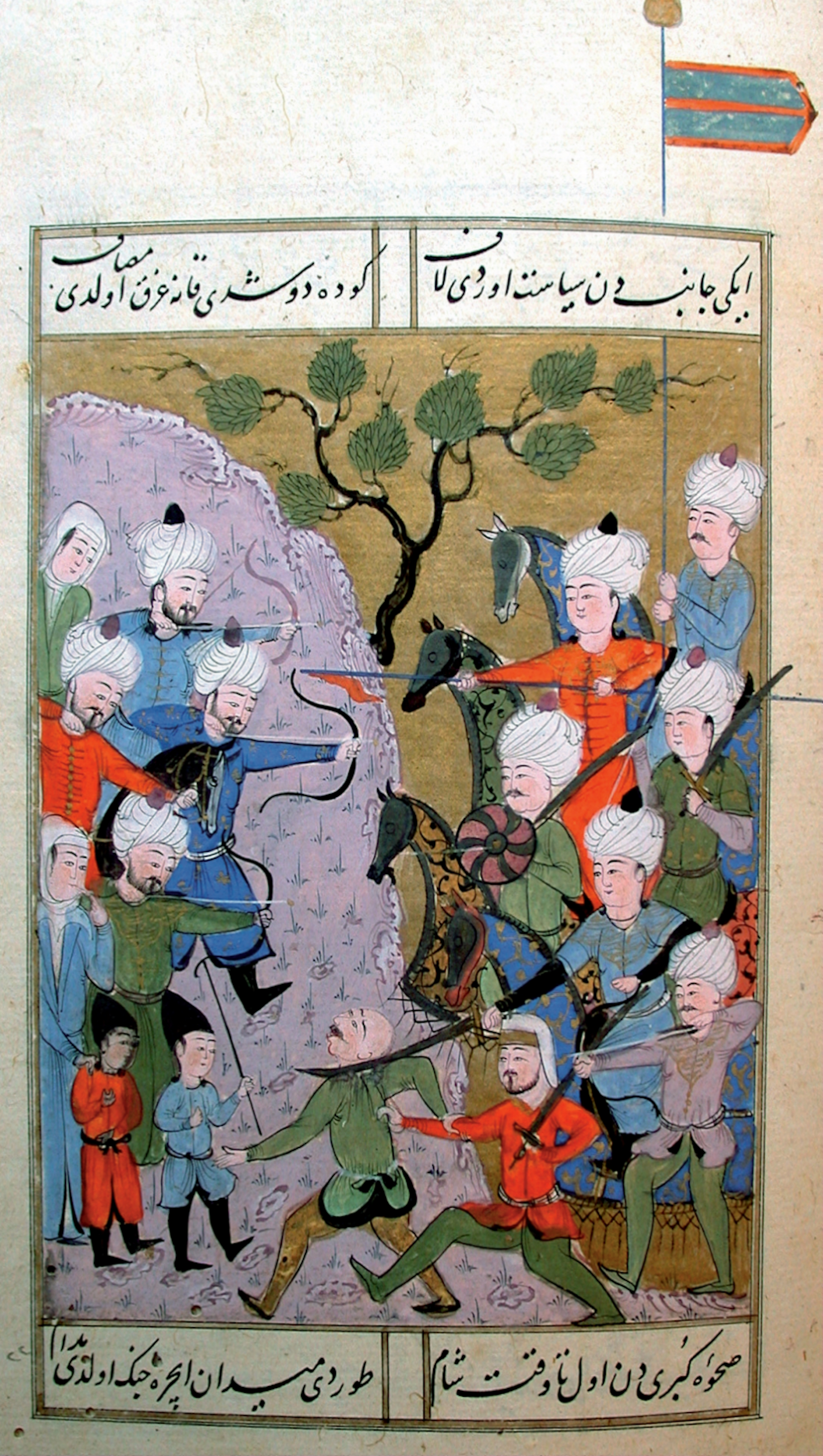
The Celali revolt. Şükri-i Bidlisi, Selīmnāme-i Şükrī, probably Maraş-Istanbul, Topkapı Palace Museum Library, Ms. H. 1597-98, fol. 264a.

Karayazıcı's rebellion began in the context of the social and economic turmoil caused by the Ottoman-Habsburg wars. As he gathered around 20,000 sekbans, local governors from Harput, Malatya, and Maraş attempted to suppress him, but they were defeated. His growing reputation attracted other Celali, including his brother Deli Hasan, Deli Zülfikar of Amasya, Karakaş Ahmed of Malatya, Kalenderoğlu Mehmed, Gâvur Murad, Tekeli Mehmed, and several others. Together, they formed a formidable alliance. Karayazıcı also allied with Hüseyin Pasha, a former governor of Abyssinia who was actually ordered to quell Karayazıcı's rebellion but had rebelled after being denied a desired position. This alliance significantly strengthened his forces, presenting a serious threat to the Ottoman state. The rebellion exacerbated social unrest in Anatolia, leading to widespread suffering and migrations, and marked the beginning of significant changes in the Ottoman social and economic order.

In response, the Ottoman government appointed a son of Koca Sinan Pasha - Mehmed Pasha (d. 1606) to suppress the rebellion on 4 August 1599. Despite initial successes, including the capture of Urfa Fortress in 1599, Karayazıcı's forces continued to resist. After capturing Urfa, Karayazıcı declared himself sultan and began issuing decrees stamped with the title "Halim Shah". This was recorded by Mustafa Selaniki, a contemporary chronicler of Karayazıcı and the sole Celali leader mentioned in his work, Tarih-i Selâniki. He asserts that Karayazıcı proclaimed himself a descendant of the shah and disseminated decrees with his tughra (imperial signature). None of Selâniki's contemporaries corroborate this information. According to William J. Griswold, similar to the situation with Ali Janbulad, Europeans would have been the initial observers of such secessionist intentions and would have sought to exploit them for their benefit. Safavid spy Michel Angelo Corai was one of such informants who encouraged Grand Duchy of Tuscany to exploit this weakness.

Soon in October 1599, Mehmed Pasha arrived under the walls of Urfa from Aleppo with 21 siege artillery guns and extensive number of troops. When the siege laster for months, Mehmed Pasha's troops became war weary. After extensive debate, the Ottoman statesmen concluded that the rebel commander would incur excessive costs in terms of time and troops, particularly with the western campaign in full swing, prompting them to negotiate with him. Karayazıcı was appointed to the beylik of Ayintab in 1600 and thereafter to the sanjak of Amasya, with the expectation that he would adopt a tranquil role. Karayazıcı took the role and handed over Hüseyin Pasha to Ottomans. Karayazici ruled Amasya for 6 months. Subsequently, he was reassigned to Çorum. In both instances, the state actively endeavored to give Karayazıcı an official position, providing him and his associates with a territory to tax and inhabit. However, the rank-and-file mercenaries under Karayazıcı persisted in their routine plundering, even imposing countless illicit taxes alongside the legitimate ones. Karayazıcı even bribed a qadi to accuse Mehmed Pasha of corruption which caused recalling to the Porte.

== Death ==
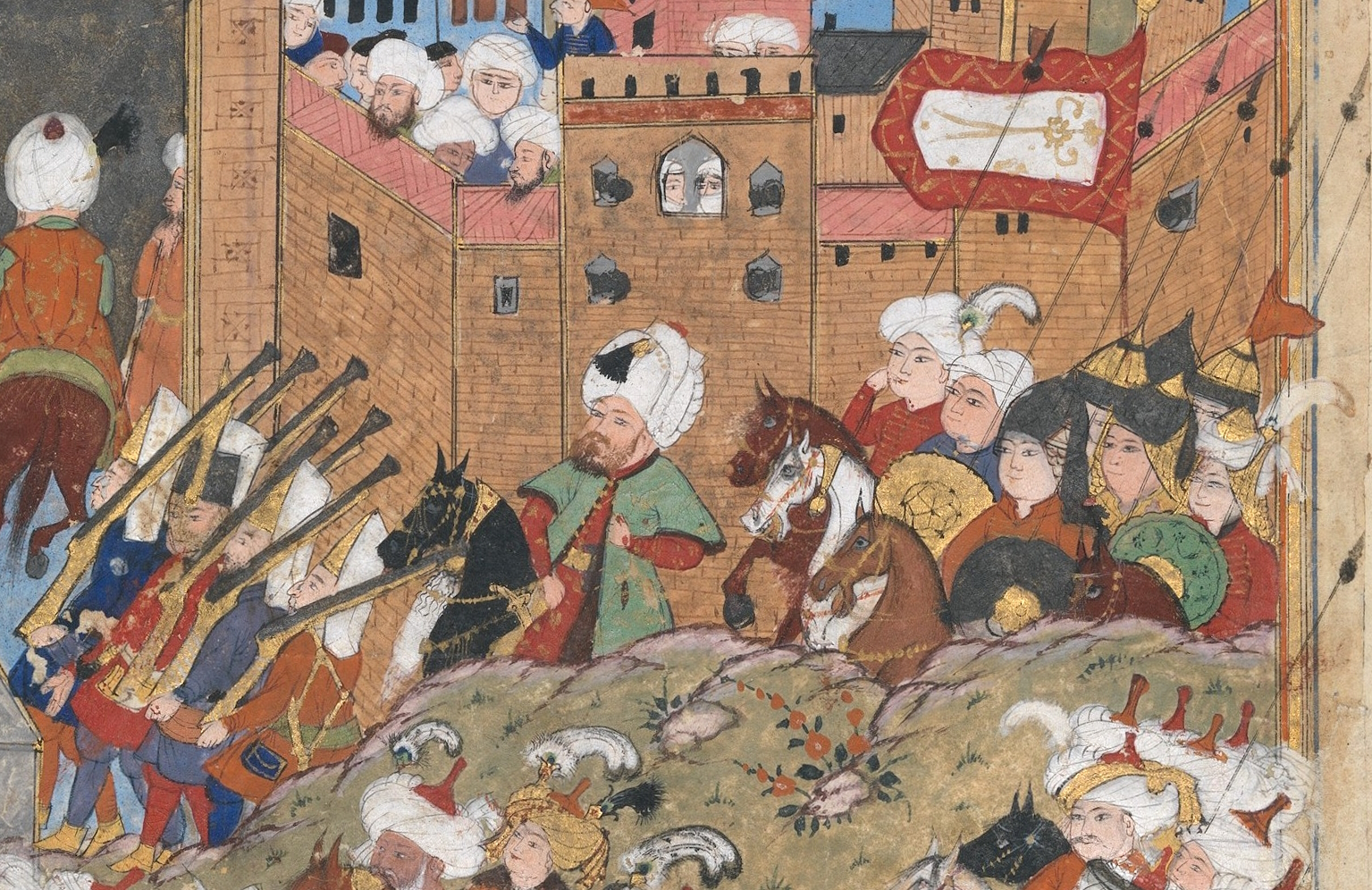
Sokulluzade Hasan Pasha (center) leading his troops in 1590. Divan of Mahmud Abd al-Baki, 1590–95

He war ordered to put down a rebellion in İçel, a request his sekbans refused. This prompted another punitive attack on Karayazıcı. An army contingent commandeered by Hacı Ibrahim Pasha arrived in summer of 1600 but lost 22 cannons and a thousand of soldiers near Kayseri. Another army arrived to punish Karayazici was under Sokulluzade Hasan Pasha in June 1601. He ambushed the rebels on 12 August 1601 near Elbistan. Losing cannons and about 20,000 of his soldiers, Karayazıcı fled to Canik Mountains, where he died soon. His body was cut into 40-50 pieces by his followers in order to prevent future desecration by Ottoman government. He was succeeded by his brother Deli Hasan who took over rebellion leadership.

== Source ==
- Griswold, William J. (1983). The great Anatolian rebellion: 1000 - 1020, 1591 - 1611. Islamkundliche Untersuchungen. Berlin: Schwarz. pp. 28–30. ISBN 978-3-922968-34-4.
