= Abaza Hasan Pasha =

Personal details
- Died: 16 February 1659 Aleppo, Ottoman Empire (present day Aleppo, Syria)
- Origins: Abaza

Military service
- Rank: Beylerbeyi

Abaza Hasan Pasha, also called Kara Hasan Pasha or Celali Hasan Pasha; (Ottoman Turkish: ابازه حسن پاشا, Abāza Ḥasan Paşa), was an Ottoman provincial governor and celali rebel of the mid-seventeenth century. He launched two rebellions against the Ottoman government, the second and largest of which ended with his assassination in Aleppo on 16 February 1659 following a failed attempt to force the deposition of the Grand Vizier Köprülü Mehmed Pasha.

Abaza Hasan first gained prominence in 1648 by defeating the Anatolian rebel Kara Haydaroğlu, for which he was rewarded with the rank of voyvoda (overseer) of the Yeni Il Türkmen. After this office was taken from him through palace intrigue, he launched his first revolt, occupying territory in northwestern Anatolia. During this time he rallied to his side other military men with grievances against the government as well as thousands of the sekban and sarıca characteristic of the Celali Rebellions. He eventually achieved his goals, recovering his office and reconciling his relationship with the central government. In the following years he was promoted to the rank of pasha and received the governorship of various provinces in the east. In the summer of 1658 he launched a second revolt, this time in response to the wide-ranging purges and executions carried out by Grand Vizier Köprülü Mehmed Pasha. Despite being joined by a significant portion of the Ottoman military establishment, Abaza Hasan and his allies were unable to enforce their demand for Köprülü's execution either by winning the support of Sultan Mehmed IV or by achieving a major military victory. Lured into the government-held city of Aleppo by promises of pardon, they were suddenly assassinated by the order of the loyalist commanders who had been sent against them.

As the last of the major Celali rebels, Abaza Hasan's defeat marked the end of a long period of instability in Anatolia. The region had suffered from repeated rebellion by provincial governors ever since the time of the revolt of Abaza Mehmed Pasha in 1622. While some minor outbreaks of rebellion continued to occur during the following era, the province generally benefited from the stability associated with Köprülü rule. Abaza Hasan's failure to depose Köprülü Mehmed enabled that family of viziers to continue administering the empire uninterrupted for another twenty-four years, until Kara Mustafa Pasha's execution following the unsuccessful Siege of Vienna in 1683.

== Biography ==
=== Early career ===
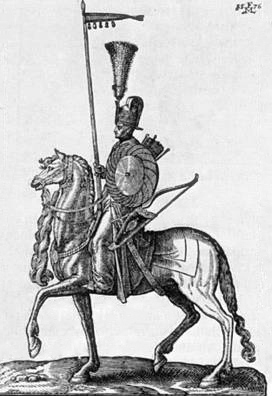
A sixteenth-century Western depiction of a sipahi, a position in which Abaza Hasan served in his youth.

Nothing is known of Abaza Hasan's life before 1648, except that he was by origin a member of the sipāhiyān, the first of the six divisions of imperial cavalry (Altı Bölük). He first entered the historical record in 1648, serving Hacı Sinanzade Mehmed Pasha as his mütesellim (deputy-governor) in the Sanjak (sub-province) of Hamid, in southwest Anatolia. There he earned a reputation for bravery and military prowess by defending the city of Isparta from the rebel Kara Haydaroğlu, who had been harassing nearby caravans and villages. While previous commanders sent to subdue him had been thwarted, Abaza Hasan ambushed and captured him in a night attack. Kara Haydaroğlu was delivered to Constantinople and executed on 12 November 1648. For his service, Abaza Hasan was given robes of honor and rewarded with the rank of voyvoda (overseer) of the Yeni Il Türkmen, at that time a lucrative post in Eastern Anatolia.

=== First revolt ===
The Ottoman government during the early years of the reign of Sultan Mehmed IV (r. 1648–1687) was rife with factional disputes and power struggles. Thus in 1651, after three years of faithfully carrying out service overseeing the Yeni Il Türkmen, he was suddenly removed from office at the insistence of a palace faction of Ocak Aghas (janissary commanders) led by Bektaş Agha. Despite the intercession of the Şeyhülislâm Karaçelebizade Abdulaziz Efendi, he was unable to regain his office. The grand vizier Melek Ahmed Pasha recognized the injustice which Abaza Hasan had suffered, but was too reliant on the support of the Aghas to be willing to help. A contemporary source depicts him fuming with rage and swearing revenge upon the Ocak Aghas. Giving up on the legal means of recompense, he and his supporters left Constantinople and began gathering an army in Anatolia, demanding either the return of his office or 60,000 guruş (silver coins of foreign origin) in compensation.

Abaza Hasan first attacked the environs of Iznikmid (Modern Izmit), before directing his forces against the Ocak Aghas who had sought his removal. He assaulted a caravan of horses and camels carrying 30,000 guruş in the name of Bektaş Agha, killing the agent who had been in charge of it. He next marched to Kastamonu, defeating its governor and looting the city, all while gathering more recruits to his banner. The next target was Bektaş Agha's privately owned farmlands in the vicinity of Ankara. To prevent his city from being attacked, the qadi (judge) of Ankara assisted Abaza Hasan in capturing the Agha's agents. The governor of Bolu, Canbolad Deli Hasan, was then assigned to suppress the rebels, but Abaza Hasan's military success and charisma led segments of Hasan's army to defect to the rebel side.

As Deli Hasan was helpless to resist, the government next assigned the Beylerbeyi of Sivas, Ibşir Mustafa Pasha, to lead the fight against Abaza Hasan. Disastrously for the government, rather than fighting, the two men began to cooperate. They found common ground in their shared Abazan ethnicity, and agreed to join forces. When they together defeated the army assembled by the next challenger, Karaman Beylerbeyi Katırcıoğlu Mehmed Pasha, the government finally recognized its inability to suppress the rebellion. Constantinople experienced a political revolution with the assassination of Kösem Sultan on 2 September 1651, and the Ocak Aghas who had been her allies were removed from power. Thus Abaza Hasan's most intractable rivals were eliminated, opening the way to peace. The rebels reached an accommodation with the government whereby Abaza Hasan recovered his office of voyvoda of the Yeni Il Türkmen, while Ibşir Pasha became the governor of Aleppo. Abaza Hasan thus achieved his initial goal, as well as having developed a reputation as a highly competent and successful leader.

=== Alliance with Ibşir Pasha ===
Following the conclusion of their revolt, Abaza Hasan continued to maintain close ties with the more politically experienced Ibşir Pasha. During his period of governance in Aleppo, Ibşir laid out his plans for reforming the Ottoman state by bringing an end to corruption and bribery. He attempted to convince the other Anatolian governors to support his plans, and kept Abaza Hasan, who was now a powerful and influential figure in Anatolia, by his side. The two of them played a decisive role in eastern Anatolian politics during this period: when Abaza Hasan's ally Hadım Karındaşı had his office revoked, they came to his aid and defeated the army of his replacement in battle. In August 1653 Abaza Hasan traveled to Constantinople with his entourage to facilitate Ibşir Pasha's appointment to the grand vizierate. There he remained, temporarily divesting himself of his duties with the Yeni Il Türkmen. When Ibşir finally achieved his desired appointment in October 1654, Abaza Hasan returned to Aleppo and accompanied him to Constantinople, acting as a trusted advisor for the duration of his tenure. Yet Ibşir Pasha's opponent Kara Murad Pasha ultimately got the better of him by convincing his longtime ally Kürd Mehmed Agha to betray him, resulting in Ibşir Pasha's execution on 11 May 1655. Kürd Mehmed had been an ally of Abaza Hasan's during his 1651 revolt, and he felt deeply offended by this betrayal. As Kürd Mehmed was in league with the new grand vizier, Abaza Hasan was forced to flee to Anatolia along with his supporters and allies.

=== Later career ===
Kürd Mehmed took for himself Abaza Hasan's former post as voyvoda of the Yeni Il Türkmen, and subsequently sought to undermine Ibşir Pasha's other former supporters. One of these was Seydi Ahmed Pasha, who had recently been appointed governor of Karaman. While Seydi was on his way to the provincial capital, Konya, Kürd Mehmed entered the city and convinced the population to resist the incoming governor, warning of his tyranny. Thus when Seydi arrived, he found the city armed against him with Kürd Mehmed organizing its defense. This led to an alliance between Seydi Ahmed and Abaza Hasan, as the two of them besieged Konya together, driving Kürd Mehmed out of the city. Yet by this time, orders had arrived from Constantinople removing Seydi from his post and assigning him to Aleppo instead. When Seydi and Abaza Hasan arrived, they found that Kürd Mehmed had done the same thing there as well, rallying the population of Aleppo to defend the city against them. Ultimately, Aleppo fell into Seydi's hands and Kürd Mehmed fled to Adana, where he and his men were killed.

With the appointment of Boynueğri Mehmed Pasha as grand vizier on 26 April 1656, Abaza Hasan again came into favor at court. He was granted the rank of pasha and appointed governor of Diyarbakır. He also continued to administer the Yeni Il Türkmen through his kethüda (steward), who was granted the office. On 2 February 1657 he was transferred to Aleppo, the final post he would ever hold.

=== Second revolt ===
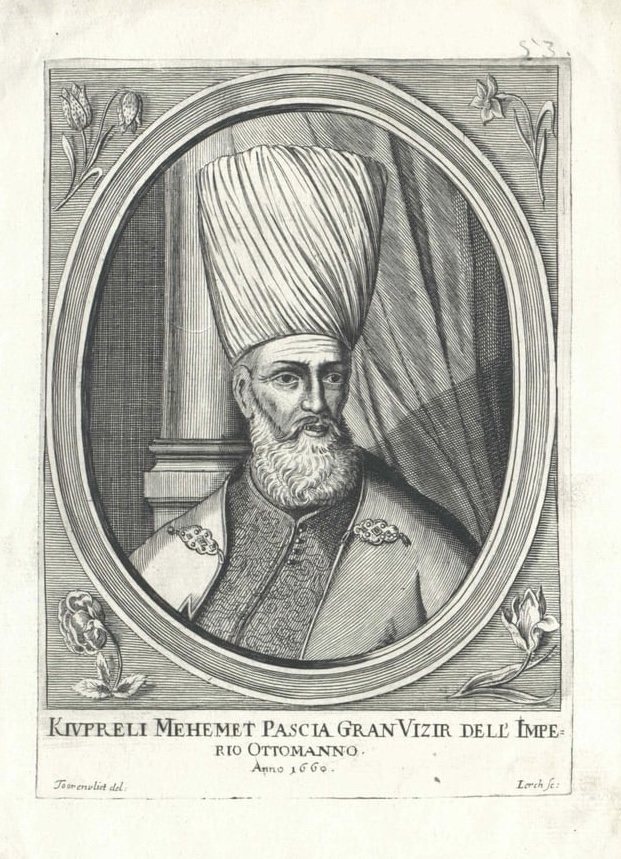
The grand vizier Köprülü Mehmed Pasha (1656–1661), whom Abaza Hasan sought to overthrow.

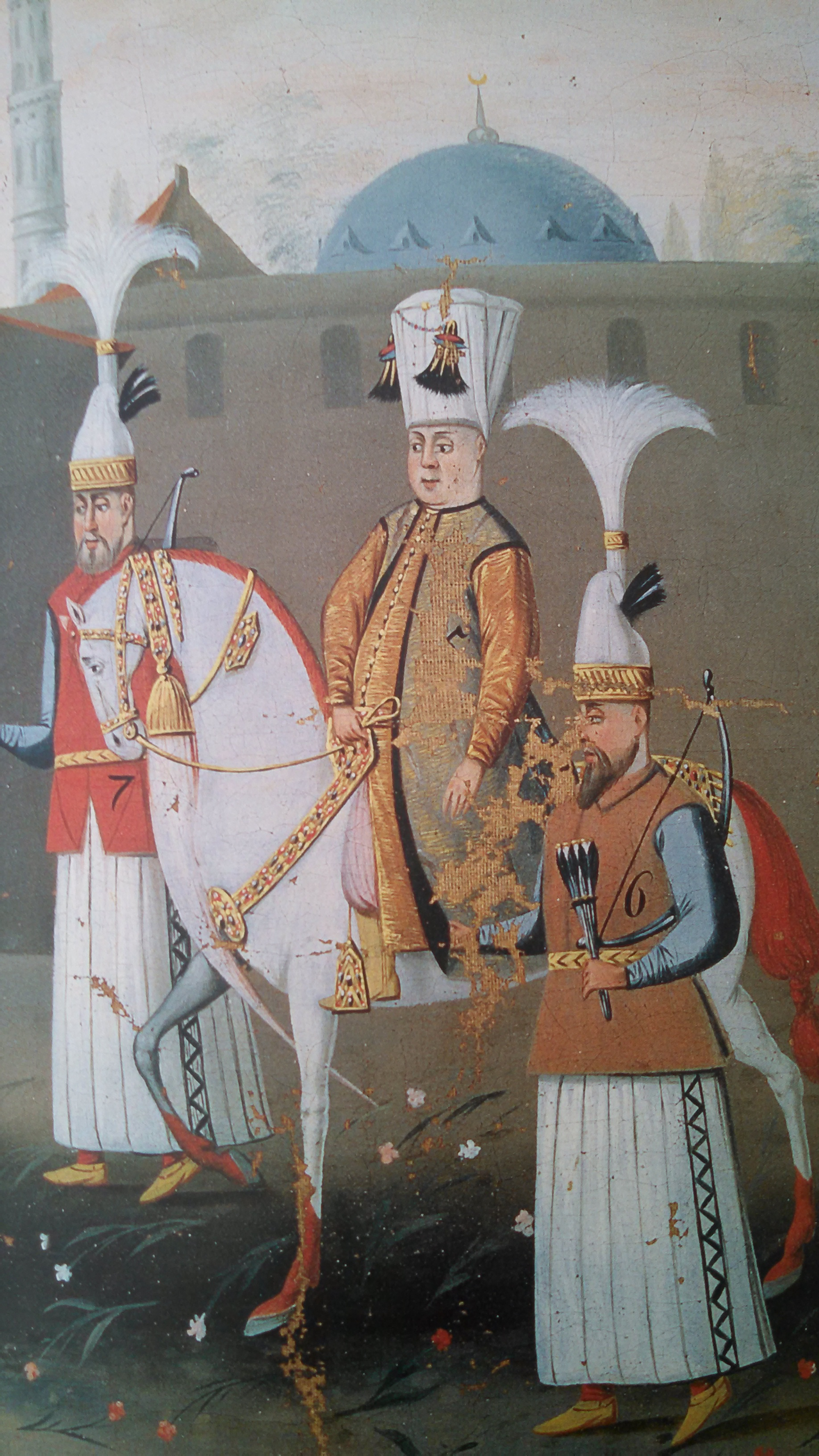
The teenaged Mehmed IV, shortly before Abaza Hasan's revolt.

Abaza Hasan's promotion to the major governorships of Diyarbakır and Aleppo coincided with another major development in Ottoman history: the beginning of the Köprülü Era. Köprülü Mehmed Pasha had been given the office of grand vizier on 15 September 1656, and since then began carrying out major reforms of the Ottoman state. Some of these aroused widespread opposition, such as the purges he carried out against the Altı Bölük cavalry regiments (of which Abaza Hasan had once been a member). In particular, after his return to Edirne from the 1657 campaign to reconquer the islands of Bozcaada (Tenedos) and Limni (Lemnos), Köprülü Mehmed ordered a massacre of all the cavalry soldiers he suspected of disloyalty - in the words of one historian, strewing the banks of the Tunca River with corpses. Abaza Hasan already had a history of disloyalty toward Köprülü: In 1657 Köprülü had ordered the execution of the governor of Egypt, and Abaza Hasan secretly aided his escape through Aleppo. Thus, when the order was given for the army to assemble for a campaign against Transylvania, Abaza Hasan and his allies chose not to heed the call. Instead, they gathered at Konya with an army of 30,000, and pledged to oppose Köprülü. Their forces included a significant portion of the Ottoman military, including the governors of Damascus, Anatolia, Raqqa, and Aleppo, which Abaza Hasan himself governed. The rebels were further supported by members of the imperial cavalry regiments who had fled from Köprülü's purges.

Initially the rebels concealed their motives, declaring that they intended to join the campaign. Yet their failure to arrive ultimately forced Köprülü Mehmed to depart without them, and he set off toward the frontier on 24 June 1658. It was only then that Abaza Hasan and his compatriots revealed their true intentions by sending an emissary to Sultan Mehmed IV, and declaring that continuing to serve the state was intolerable so long as Köprülü Mehmed was not killed. They stated that their revolt was a response to the grand vizier having killed so many innocent men, and their fear that he would turn on them next. The rebel army then began its march from Konya to Bursa, the premier city of Ottoman Anatolia. Along the way Abaza Hasan issued orders preventing his troops from looting the countryside in an attempt to establish his public image as a fighter for justice. Yet even when his army surrounded Bursa and occupied the nearby towns and villages, the sultan continued to decisively stand behind his grand vizier and reject the demands of the rebels, referring to them as the servants of the Devil. Bursa successfully resisted the rebels throughout thirty days of siege, despite the defection of its commander Kenan Pasha to the rebel side. Abaza Hasan's failure to capture this city proved decisive in undermining the long-term viability of his revolt.

As the grand vizier was away on campaign with the imperial army, command of the loyalist forces was assigned to Murtaza Pasha, who was at that time charged with the defense of the eastern frontier with the Safavids, with whom the Ottomans were at peace. He was ordered to assemble the armies of the eastern governors to defeat Abaza Hasan. Simultaneously, the Şeyhülislâm Bolevi Mustafa Efendi issued a fatwa declaring Abaza Hasan to be saʿī bi-l-fesād, or "a formenter of corruption," thus sanctioning the death penalty for him. The Sultan also issued a general call for the populace to take up arms against the rebels, and Köprülü Mehmed was recalled from Transylvania, where he had successfully conquered the fortress town of Yanova (modern Ineu). Upon his return at the beginning of November, salaries were distributed to the imperial troops. All those who failed to appear had their names erased from the muster rolls, amounting to some 7,000 men, or one third of all imperial cavalrymen. Some of the rebel troops sought at this point to rejoin the loyalist side and claim their salaries, causing instability in the rebel ranks. As it were, the formerly rebellious cavalrymen who arrived in Constantinople found only executioners waiting for them.

With Murtaza Pasha's army approaching, the rebels opted to abandon their positions in western Anatolia. Abaza Hasan returned to the region near Konya, near to where he had defeated Kara Haydaroğlu ten years previously. There, on 11 December 1658, he attacked Murtaza's army outside the town of Ilgın and inflicted on him a severe defeat, demonstrating once again his military skill. Despite this, the severity of the winter led him to continue his retreat. The rebel forces ultimately established winter quarters in the southeast Anatolian city of Ayntab (modern Gaziantep), while Murtaza and what was left of his army spent the winter in Aleppo, which had been seized from the rebels earlier in the year.

=== Assassination ===
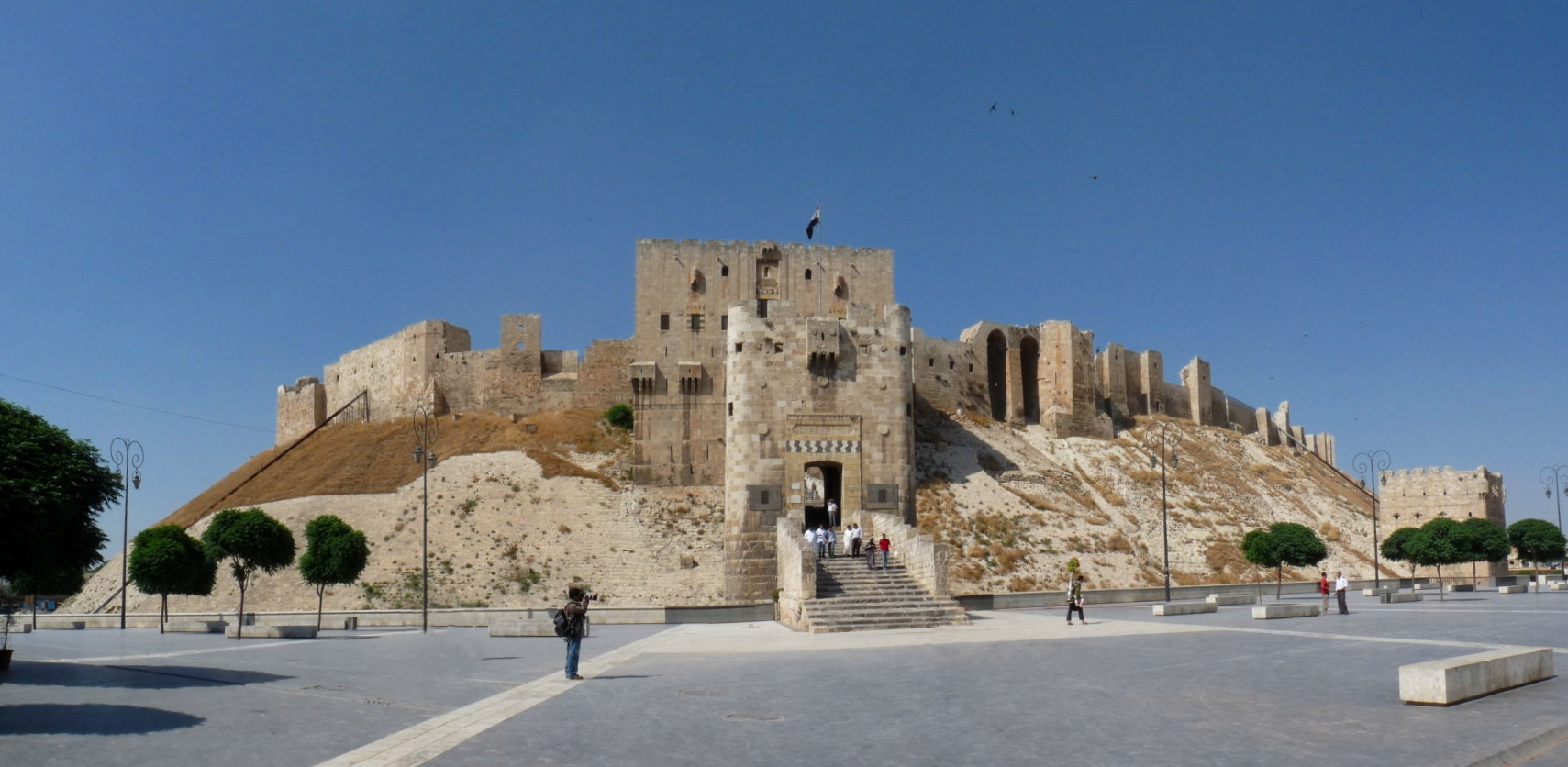
A cannon was fired from the Aleppo Citadel (pictured in 2010) to signal that Abaza Hasan had been killed.

By early 1659, Abaza Hasan's army was suffering greatly from lack of supplies in the unusually harsh winter. In response to the increasingly vocal complaints coming from his troops, including the open defection of several thousand of them to the loyalist side, he accepted the impossibility of his victory and opened negotiations with Murtaza Pasha, using the Mufti of Ayntab as an intermediary. In exchange for vows of safety and pardon, he and his top commanders agreed to surrender and enter the city of Aleppo, while their army remained encamped outside. The rebels were then lodged in the mansions of the loyalist pashas, with Abaza Hasan residing with Murtaza. The two sides conversed cordially over the course of several days, and drafted letters to be sent to the capital, asking for pardon for the rebels. Despite this, at the time of the night prayer on 16 February 1659, the loyalists carried out a plot to murder their unsuspecting guests. While Abaza Hasan was preparing for prayer by performing ablutions, assassins approached and cut his throat from behind. A cannon was then fired from the Aleppo Citadel, indicating to the other pashas that it was time to massacre the remaining rebel leaders.

Historians disagree on the motive for this sudden betrayal. Some attest that Murtaza ordered the massacre out of distrust, while others are of the opinion that Abaza Hasan was himself actively preparing to seize Aleppo from within, and Murtaza took action to preempt this.

Abaza Hasan's head was severed and stuffed with straw to be put on display in Constantinople, and his body was hung outside of one of Aleppo's city gates, serving as a public demonstration that the revolt had been crushed.

== Personal life and character ==
Abaza Hasan was described in contemporary sources primarily in negative terms, as Ottoman writers sought to emphasize the suffering and oppression peasants and townspeople experienced at the hands of his troops. He was particularly demonized for launching his rebellion at the same time as the Ottomans were engaged in warfare with non-Muslims. Nevertheless, many positive traits were still attributed to him, particularly with regard to his military skill. The traveler Evliya Çelebi, who met Abaza Hasan on numerous occasions, described him as "the most courageous and brave of all the Abazan people; diligent, proud, a true hero." During his second uprising, his cause also received a great deal of popular support in Constantinople, particularly among the religious preachers, who heralded him as the 'renewer of the faith of the eleventh century'. Thus Abaza Hasan's public image among contemporaries was highly variable, ranging from that of a messianic figure destined to bring about justice, to a cruel and oppressive bandit.

Abaza Hasan is known to have had a daughter, who married a man known as Hamamcıoğlu ("Son of the Bath-attendant"). Hamamcıoğlu played a major role during Abaza Hasan's second revolt, acting as his agent in Aleppo while his father-in-law was away with the army. In late 1658 Hamamcıoğlu was chased out of Aleppo and killed by the loyalist army.

== See also ==
- Transformation of the Ottoman Empire (1550–1700)
- Jelali Revolts
- Köprülü Era

== Bibliography ==
- Dankoff, Robert (1993). The Intimate Life of an Ottoman Statesman: Melek Ahmed Pasha (1588–1662) As Portrayed in Evliya Çelebi's Book of Travels. Albany: SUNY Press.
- Finkel, Caroline (2005). Osman's Dream: The Story of the Ottoman Empire, 1300–1923. New York: Basic Books. ISBN 978-0-465-02396-7.
- Heyd, Uriel (1973). Studies in Old Ottoman Criminal Law. Oxford: Oxford University Press.
- İlgürel, Mücteba. "Abaza Hasan". Türkiye Diyanet Vakfi İslâm Ansiklopedisi. Vol. 1. pp. 10–11. [in Turkish]
- İlgürel, Mücteba (1976). Abaza Hasan Paşa İsyanı [The Revolt of Abaza Hasan Pasha] (Docent Thesis). Istanbul University Faculty of the Arts. [in Turkish]
- İnalcık, Halil (2015). Devlet-i 'Aliyye: Osmanlı İmparatorluğu Üzerine Araştırmalar - III, Köprülüler Devri [Devlet-i 'Aliyye: Studies on the Ottoman Empire - III, Köprülü Era]. Istanbul: Türkiye Bankası Kültür Yayınları. [in Turkish]
- İnalcık, Halil (1980). "Military and Fiscal Transformation in the Ottoman Empire, 1600–1700". Archivum Ottomanicum. 6: 283–337.
- Naîmâ Mustafa Efendi (2007). İpşirli, Mehmet (ed.). Târih-i Na'îmâ (Ravzatü'l-Hüseyin fî Hulâsati Ahbâri'l-Hâfikayn [Naima's History - The Garden of Hüseyin in Summary of the News of East and West]. Vol. 6. Ankara. [In Ottoman Turkish]
- Thomas, Lewis V. (1972). Norman Itzkowitz (ed.). A Study of Naima. New York: New York University Press.
