= Siege of Kayseri (1651) =

Siege of Kayseri by Celali rebel forces in 1651

- Part of the Celali rebellions
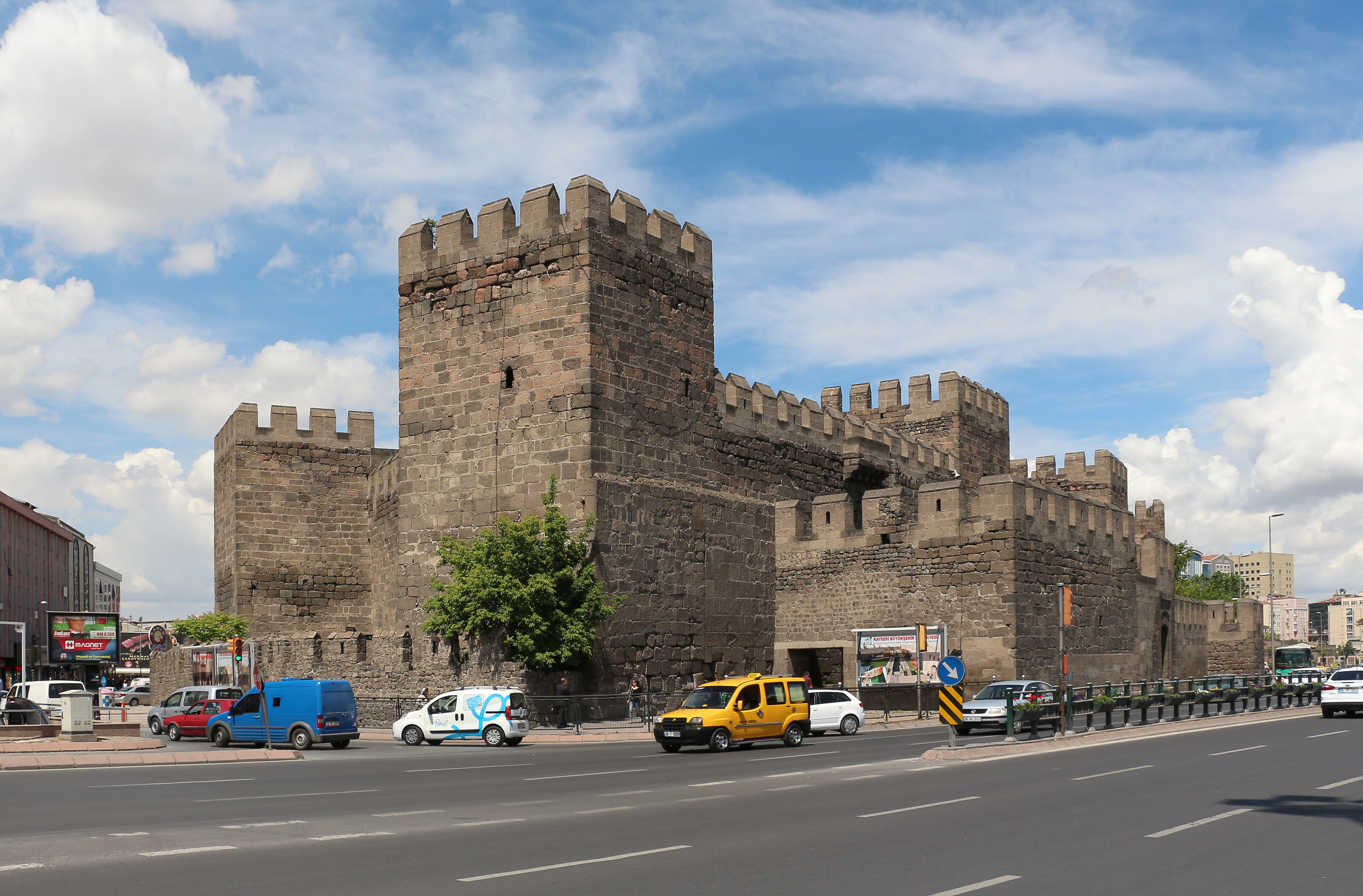
- Kayseri castle today
| Date | 1651 |
| Location | Kayseri, Ottoman Empire |
| Result | Celali victory |

Belligerents
| Ottoman Empire | Celali rebels |

Commanders and leaders
| (Ottoman Empire) Dilaver Pasha (POW) | Kurd Mehmed Agha; Ibşir Mustafa Pasha; Abaza Hasan Pasha |

Strength
| (Ottoman Empire) 200 soldiers (Ottoman Empire) Thousands of civilian defenders | 2,000+ Sekban and saricas |

Casualties and losses
| (Ottoman Empire) All soldiers killed or surrendered (Ottoman Empire) 50+ civilians killed | Minimal |

The 1651 siege of Kayseri took place during the Celali rebellions in central Anatolia. Rebel forces led by Kurd Mehmed Agha, Ibşir Mustafa Pasha, and Abaza Hasan Pasha besieged the city of Kayseri, capturing it after a prolonged blockade. The siege was one of the major blows to Ottoman authority during the widespread uprisings of the mid-17th century.

== Background ==
The mid-17th century was a period of significant turmoil within the Ottoman Empire, marked by political instability, severe economic crises, and widespread provincial discontent. The Celali rebellions, fueled by the grievances of soldiers, peasants, and local notables, destabilized much of Anatolia. In the power vacuum that followed the deposition of Sultan İbrahim I and the ascension of the child sultan Mehmed IV, multiple rebel leaders rose to prominence. Among these leaders, Kurd Mehmed Agha, a former provincial cavalryman (sipahi), emerged as one of the most powerful. He joined forces with two other notable Celali commanders, İbşir Mustafa Pasha and Abaza Hasan Pasha, to challenge Ottoman authority in the region. At the time, the city of Kayseri held strategic importance as a major center of trade and administration in central Anatolia. The Ottoman-appointed governor, Dilaver Pasha, was responsible for the defense of the city. However, the region was already weakened by previous raids, economic decline, and a shortage of well-trained troops. Recognizing the opportunity, the Celali coalition decided to move against Kayseri. Their aim was not only to loot the city but to establish it as a major stronghold of rebel power.

== Prelude ==
In early 1651, Kurd Mehmed Agha, İbşir Mustafa Pasha, and Abaza Hasan Pasha began mobilizing forces across central Anatolia. Their coalition gathered various discontented sipahis (cavalrymen), disbanded janissaries, and desperate peasants, forming a formidable rebel army. Contemporary accounts describe their forces as highly mobile and brutal, employing swift raids to terrify local populations. As news of the approaching rebel army spread, panic gripped Kayseri. Governor Dilaver Pasha, recognizing the vulnerability of the city, tried to reinforce the defenses. Fortifications around the city's medieval castle were hastily repaired, and local militias were armed. Despite these efforts, the city was poorly prepared. Food stores were limited, and the garrison was composed mostly of hastily conscripted civilians and a small contingent of professional soldiers. Kayseri's isolation from other major Ottoman centers further worsened its chances of survival.

== Siege ==
The siege commenced around mid-1651. Kurd Mehmed Agha's forces swiftly surrounded the city, blocking all access to supplies. According to chroniclers like Naîmâ and Cevdet Pasha, the rebels maintained a tight blockade, preventing even secret movement of goods or messengers. Inside Kayseri, famine quickly took hold. Reports mention that the population was reduced to eating leaves and roots. Disease followed starvation, and the morale among both soldiers and civilians plummeted. Several minor attempts to break the siege failed, leading to heavy casualties among the defenders. At one point, Governor Dilaver Pasha attempted to negotiate a truce, but Kurd Mehmed Agha demanded unconditional surrender. Naîmâ notes that Kurd Mehmed aimed to make an example of Kayseri to intimidate other cities still loyal to the Ottoman government. After several months of blockade and repeated assaults, the exhausted defenders could no longer hold. In late 1651, the gates of Kayseri were opened, and rebel forces poured into the city. The fall of Kayseri marked a decisive rebel victory. Dilaver Pasha and the surviving officials surrendered. Some sources suggest that the local population suffered greatly during the subsequent looting, although detailed casualty numbers are unknown.

== Aftermath ==
Following the capture of Kayseri, Kurd Mehmed Agha, İbşir Mustafa Pasha, and Abaza Hasan Pasha consolidated their control over central Anatolia. The fall of such an important city severely undermined Ottoman authority in the region. According to Naîmâ, the rebel commanders distributed the captured supplies among their forces and declared Kayseri a Celali stronghold. The city became a major logistical base for further rebel operations. The Ottoman central government, already weakened by court intrigues and the minority rule of Sultan Mehmed IV, initially struggled to respond effectively. However, the loss of Kayseri shocked the imperial court into action. Plans were made to organize a counter-offensive.By 1652, orders were issued to loyalist commanders to suppress the rebellion. Ottoman records mention that campaigns were launched from Sivas and Tokat against the rebels, although these early attempts largely failed. In the longer term, the Celali rebellions continued to ravage Anatolia for years. While Kurd Mehmed Agha eventually lost influence, İbşir Mustafa Pasha and Abaza Hasan Pasha later shifted allegiances, joining the Ottoman side during later internal conflicts. Their careers illustrate the fluid loyalties of provincial elites during this chaotic era.The Siege of Kayseri stands as a symbol of the Ottoman state's declining provincial control during the 17th century, and it remains one of the most significant events of the Celali uprisings.

== Legacy ==
Modern historians see the fall of Kayseri as indicative of the deep structural crises faced by the Ottoman Empire. It demonstrated not only the empire's military weakness but also its inability to maintain loyalty among provincial elites. The event is cited by scholars as an example of how local uprisings could paralyze major cities and destabilize entire regions even during times when the empire maintained a strong image externally. Today, while there are no surviving monuments directly related to the siege, the event is still remembered in academic works on Ottoman provincial history and the Celali revolts.

== See also ==
- Celali rebellions
- History of Kayseri
- İbşir Mustafa Pasha
- Abaza Hasan Pasha
