= Hüseyin Pasha (Celali rebel) =

16th-century Turkish rebel and former governor

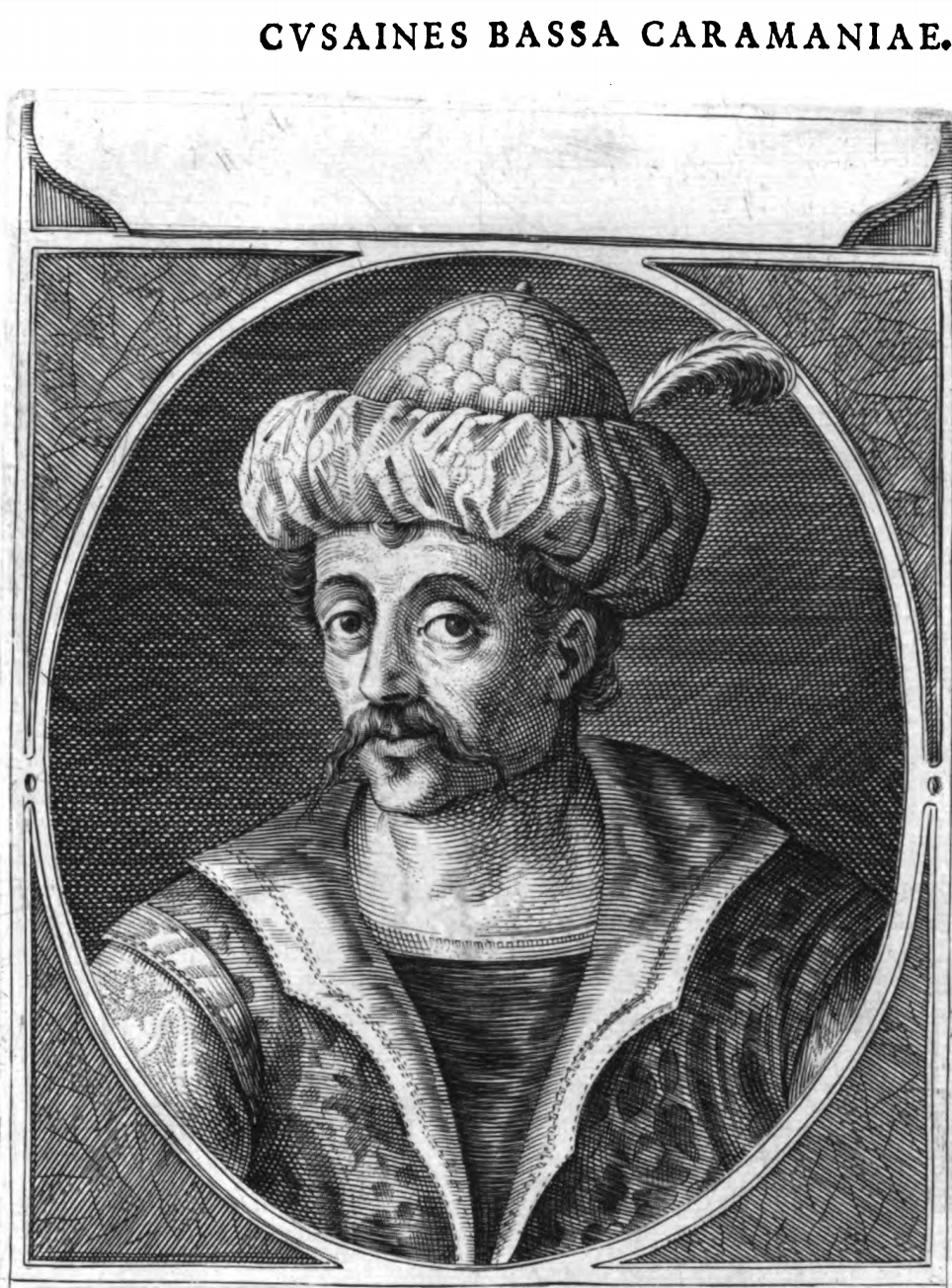
- Portrait of Hüseyin Pasha by Dominicus Custos, 1600

Beylerbey of Abyssinia
- In office 16 January 1568 – 3 December 1570
- Preceded by: Özdemiroğlu Osman Pasha
- Succeeded by: Ahmet Pasha

Personal details
- Born: Amasya
- Died: February 1600 Constantinople, Ottoman Empire

Hüseyin Pasha (died February 1600) was a leader of Celali rebellions and a former Beylerbey of Abyssinia in Ottoman Empire in 16th century.

== Career ==
Although Venetian sources portray him as ethnic Albanian, he is also known with the epithet The Bosnian (Ottoman Turkish: بوسنوی, romanized: Bosnavî, lit. 'From Bosnia'). However, Turkish author Hüseyin Hüsameddin Yasar proposed an alternative Turkish origin from Amasya. According to him, he was a son of Budak bey, a descendant of Shadgeldi and participated in Ottoman conquest of Shirvan. He served as third Beylerbey of Abyssinia from 16 January 1568 to 3 December 1570. His tenure in Ethiophia was uneventful.

After serving as the beylerbeyi, according to Venetian sources, he served under Koca Sinan Pasha in court. he was appointed as the mîrlivâ (district governor) of Amasya in October 1590, but as he was also in charge of the defense of Erzurum, he appointed Zülfikâr Ağa to serve as the mütesellim (deputy governor) of Amasya. He soon was invested with title of inspector of Anatolia (Karaman) and set off for inspections of fiefs, tours of the region. Hüseyin Pasha allocated portions of the landholdings to the leaders of the insurgents and appointed them as commanders of those territories to quell the revolt. Among these measures, Yaramaz Ahmed Ağa, originally from Köprülü and later a rebel in Amasya, was granted the governorship of Karahisâr-ı Şarkî, and Deli Mustafa Ağa from Amasya was appointed to the governoship of Erzincan. By distributing estates to their followers, Hüseyin Pasha managed to largely suppress the rebellion.

Furthermore, he accused the beylerbey of Sivas, Mahmud Pasha who was appointed in 1598, of misusing his power and oppressing the reaya (tax-paying subjects of the Sultan) in the region. He informed the sultan about Mahmud Pasha's negligence. Nonetheless, Mahmud Pasha's clients persuaded the sultan that Hüseyin Pasha was the true exploiter, resulting in his dismissal in May 1599. Subsequently, Hüseyin Pasha was incarcerated in the Amasya dungeon in 1599 alongside his deputy Zülfikâr Ağa, and after a duration of four months, he successfully escaped and returned to Karaman.

== Rebellion ==
According to the Venetian consul in Aleppo, Hüseyin Pasha's imprisonment was due to the substantial sum of money he transported from Abyssinia. The consul stated that Ottoman authorities sought to seize pasha's assets and, consequently, attributed responsibility to him. According to Levent Kaya Ocakaçan, while it is reasonable to acknowledge this regarding Hüseyin Pasha's imprisonment, a conflict of interest also existed between Mahmud Pasha and Hüseyin Pasha's household. Upon his initial arrival in Karaman, Hüseyin Pasha impaled two kapıcıbaşı and executed a çavuş, attributing their actions to mistreatment of the reaya. Consequently, his return to Karaman incited turmoil among Mahmud Pasha's clients. After paying large sum of bribe, he was reappointed to the post of inspector.

However, soon enough he rebelled against Ottoman authority. The sipahis attributed Hüseyin Paşa’s insurrection to conflict with Gazanfer Agha, Venetian-born Ottoman kapıağası, who had sold a district to him and subsequently appointed another governor-general to the region before Hüseyin Pasha could gather the revenues on his investment in the tax farm. Upon his arrival in Karaman, he possessed 4,000 cavalrymen, which he subsequently increased to 8,000 within a month. He selected Konya as his base and commenced tax collection from the district. According to Venetian sources, he amassed 40,000 scudi from Konya and 20,000 scudi from Kayseri effortlessly, and he decisively vanquished the Ottoman armies dispatched to confront him. He successfully exerted control over the entire district by the summer of 1599.

Through course of rebellion, Hüseyin Pasha got close with Karayazıcı Abdülhalim, leader of Celali rebellion whom he was sent against earlier. Hüseyin Pasha was the highest Ottoman official ever to raise rebellion. Because of this reason, Mehmed III made his priority to quell his uprising first. Sultan soon appointed a son of Koca Sinan Pasha - Mehmed Pasha (d. 1606) to suppress the rebellion on 4 August 1599. The situation remained difficult until September, and Mehmed's army's weak state prevented him from leaving Istanbul. They realized Anatolia's instability made marching impossible. Meanwhile Karayazıcı marched from Diyarbakır to Antep, while Hüseyin Pasha retreated to Kars. In order to prevent both rebels from uniting, he requested that Karayazıcı be appointed governor of Samsun in a letter to the sultan. Karayazıcı declined the pasha's offer after learning about his plans from Istanbul clientele. Hüseyin Pasha and Karayazıcı united their forces and conquered Urfa Castle. After arriving in Urfa, Mehmed Paşa besieged the city and waited for reinforcements from Aleppo. Meanwhile, another rebel, Gâvur Murad, arrived at Erzurum with 4,000 soldiers and in order to incite Shah Abbas to invade. Observing the situation, Giorgio Emo, the Venetian consul in Aleppo reported to Signoria that "surely, this year the Persians will go to war against the Ottomans" on December 12, 1599.

After defeating Mehmed Pasha's army 24 times, Hüseyin Pasha was soon betrayed by Karayazıcı as he was getting alarmed by him raising popularity among rebels. Hüseyin was detained and turned over to Mehmed Pasha, who then relieved his siege. He was taken to Istanbul and was executed in February 1600 publicly with the attendance of Sultan himself. His execution was described by John Sanderson (1560-1627), a Levant Company clerk who was one of the witnesses. According to him, he saw Pasha hanging from a hook, with muscles pulled from his shoulder blades in a gruesome display. Several viziers were present, and the Sultan himself watched from a window. Sanderson noted that Hüseyin Pasha died swiftly from the torture before they could carry him more than half a mile from the palace.

After his demise, his brother Aliç Bey and his deputy Zülfikâr Ağa joined Celalis, with Zülfikar Ağa seizing Amasya. News about his rebellion in Europe was published by Bernardino Beccari.

== Sources ==
- Yasar, Hüseyin Hüsâmeddin (1927). Amasya Tarihi [History of Amasya] (in Ottoman Turkish). Vol. 3.
- Griswold, William J. (1983). The great Anatolian rebellion: 1000 - 1020, 1591 - 1611. Islamkundliche Untersuchungen. Berlin: Schwarz. pp. 28–30. ISBN 978-3-922968-34-4.
