= Tax exemption =

Monetary exemption from taxes that would otherwise be levied

Tax exemption is the reduction or removal of a liability to make a compulsory payment that would otherwise be imposed by a ruling power upon persons, property, income, or transactions. Tax-exempt status may provide complete relief from taxes, reduced rates, or tax on only a portion of items. Examples include exemption of charitable organizations from property taxes and income taxes, veterans, and certain cross-border or multi-jurisdictional scenarios.

Similar terminology is used on different types of tax expenditures, such as tax exclusion and tax deduction. A tax exemption is an income stream on which no tax is levied, such as interest income from state and local bonds, which is often exempt from federal income tax. Additionally, certain qualifying non-profit organizations are exempt from federal income tax. A tax exclusion refers to a dollar amount (or proportion of taxable income) that can be legally excluded from the taxable base income prior to assessment of tax, such as the $250,000/$500,000 home sale tax exclusion in the U.S. A tax deduction is a documented amount subtracted from the adjusted gross income to compute taxable income, such as charitable contributions.

International duty free shopping may be termed "tax-free shopping". In tax-free shopping, the goods are permanently taken outside the jurisdiction, thus paying taxes is not necessary. Tax-free shopping is also found in ships, airplanes and other vessels traveling between countries (or tax areas). Tax-free shopping is usually available in dedicated duty-free shops. In such a scenario, a sum equivalent to the tax is paid, but reimbursed on exit. More common in Europe, tax-free is less frequent in the United States, with the exception of Louisiana. However, current European Union rules prohibit most intra-EU tax-free trade, with the exception of certain special territories outside the tax area.

== Specific monetary exemptions ==
Some jurisdictions allow for a specific monetary reduction of the tax base, which may be referred to as an exemption. For example, the U.S. Federal and many state tax systems allow a deduction of a specified dollar amount for each of several categories of "personal exemptions". Similar amounts may be called "personal allowances". Some systems may provide thresholds at which such exemptions or allowances are phased out or removed.

== Exempt organizations ==
Some governments grant broad exclusions from all taxation for certain types of organization. The exclusions may be restricted to entities having various characteristics. The exclusions may be inherent in definitions or restrictions outside the tax law itself.

=== Approaches for exemption ===
There are several different approaches used in granting exemption to organizations. Different approaches may be used within a jurisdiction or especially within sub-jurisdictions.

Some jurisdictions grant an overall exemption from taxation to organizations meeting certain definitions. The United Kingdom, for example, provides an exemption from rates (property taxes), and income taxes for entities governed by the Charities Law. This overall exemption may be somewhat limited by limited scope for taxation by the jurisdiction. Some jurisdictions may levy only a single type of tax, exemption from only a particular tax.

Some jurisdictions provide for exemption only from certain taxes. The United States exempts certain organizations from Federal income taxes, but not from various excise or most employment taxes.

=== Charitable, nonprofit and religious organizations ===
Many tax systems provide complete exemption from tax for recognized charitable or nonprofit organizations. Such organizations may include religious organizations (temples, mosques, churches, etc.), fraternal organizations (including social clubs), public charities (e.g., organizations serving homeless persons), or any of a broad variety of organizations considered to serve public purposes.

The U.S. system exempts from Federal and many state income taxes the income of organizations that have qualified for such exemption. Qualification requires that the organization be created and operated for one of a long list of tax-exempt purposes, which includes more than 28 types of organizations and also requires, for most types of organizations, that the organization apply for tax-exempt status with the Internal Revenue Service, or be a religious or apostolic organization. The U.S. system does not distinguish between various kinds of tax-exempt entities (such as educational versus charitable) for purposes of granting exemption, but does make such distinctions with respect to allowing a tax deduction for contributions.

The UK generally exempts public charities from business rates, corporation tax, income tax, and certain other taxes.

Tax exemption status of nonprofit organizations can in some cases result in financial mismanagement and negative societal value.

=== Governmental entities ===
Most systems exempt internal governmental units from all tax. For multi-tier jurisdictions, this exemption generally extends to lower tier units and across units. For example, state and local governments are not subject to Federal, state, or local income taxes in the U.S.

=== Pension schemes ===
Most systems do not tax entities organized to conduct retirement investment and pension activities for employees of one or more employers or for the benefit of employees. In addition, many systems also provide tax exemption for personal pension schemes.

=== Educational institutions ===
Some jurisdictions provide separate total or partial tax exemptions for educational institutions. These exemptions may be limited to certain functions or income.

=== Sales tax ===
Most states and localities imposing sales and use taxes in the United States exempt resellers from sales taxes on goods held for sale and ultimately sold. In addition, most such states and localities exempt from sales taxes goods used directly in the production of other goods (i.e., raw materials).

== Exempt individuals ==
Certain classes of persons may be granted a full or partial tax exemption within a system. Common exemptions are for veterans, clergymen or taxpayers with children (who can take "dependency exemption" for each qualifying dependent who has lived with the taxpayer. The dependent can be a natural child, step-child, step-sibling, half-sibling, adopted child, eligible foster child, or grandchild, and is usually under age 19, a full-time student under age 24, or have special needs). The exemption granted may depend on multiple criteria, including criteria otherwise unrelated to the particular tax. For example, a property tax exemption may be provided to certain classes of veterans earning less than a particular income level. Definitions of exempt individuals tend to be complex.

== Exempt income ==
Most income tax systems exclude certain classes of income from the taxable income base. Such exclusions may be referred to as exclusions or exemptions. Systems vary highly. Among the more commonly excluded items are:

- Income earned outside the taxing jurisdiction. Such exclusions may be limited in amount.
- Interest income earned from subsidiary jurisdictions.
- Income consisting of compensation for loss.
- The value of property inherited or acquired by gift.

Some tax systems specifically exclude from income items that the system is trying to encourage. Such exclusions or exemptions can be quite specific or very general.

Among the types of income that may be included are classes of income earned in specific areas, such as special economic zones, enterprise zones, etc. These exemptions may be limited to specific industries. As an example, India provides SEZs where exporters of goods or providers of services to foreign customers may be exempt from income taxes and customs duties.

== Exempt property ==
Certain types of property are commonly granted exemption from property or transaction (such as sales or value added) taxes. These exemptions vary highly from jurisdiction to jurisdiction, and definitions of what property qualifies for exemption can be voluminous.

Among the more commonly granted exemptions are:

- Property used in manufacture of other goods (which goods may ultimately be taxable)
- Property used by a tax exempt or other parties for a charitable or other not for profit purpose
- Property considered a necessity of life, often exempted from sales taxes in the United States
- Personal residence of the taxpayer, often subject to specific monetary limitations

== Multi-tier jurisdictions ==
Many countries that impose tax have subdivisions or subsidiary jurisdictions that also impose tax. This feature is not unique to federal systems, like the U.S., Switzerland and Australia, but rather is a common feature of national systems. The top tier system may impose restrictions on both the ability of the lower tier system to levy tax as well as how certain aspects of such lower tier system work, including the granting of tax exemptions. The restrictions may be imposed directly on the lower jurisdiction's power to levy tax or indirectly by regulating tax effects of the exemption at the upper tier.

== Cross-border agreements ==
Jurisdictions may enter into agreements with other jurisdictions that provide for double taxation relief. Such provisions are common in an income tax treaty. These reciprocal tax exemptions typically call for each contracting jurisdiction to exempt certain income of a resident of the other contracting jurisdiction.

Multi-jurisdictional agreements for tax exemption also exist. 20 of the U.S. states have entered into the Multistate Tax Compact that provides, among other things, that each member must grant a full credit for sales and use taxes paid to other states or subdivisions. The European Union members are all parties to the EU multi-country VAT harmonisation rules.

== Diplomatic tax exemptions ==
The US provides a few tax exemptions for their diplomatic mission visitors.

=== Sales tax exemption ===
The Department's Office of Foreign Missions (OFM) issues diplomatic tax exemption cards to eligible foreign missions and their accredited members and dependents on the basis of international law and reciprocity.

There are two types of diplomatic sales exemption cards. The mission tax exemption card is used by foreign missions to buy necessary items for the mission. This type of card work only while paying with a cheque, credit card, or wire transfer transaction and must be made in the name of the mission otherwise it is not eligible for the tax exemption. These cards may only be issued to a person, who is a principal member or an employee of the mission, holds an A or G visa, and is not a permanent resident of the US. The personal tax exemption card is issued to eligible foreign mission members for exemption on their personal item purchases. The user of this card is the only person who might use this card on his purchases and he is the only one who can profit from them.

There are 4 levels of exemption cards, and each one holds a name after an animal:

- Owl: This card is for mission tax exemption with no restriction
- Buffalo: This card is for mission tax exemption with some degree of restriction
- Eagle: This card is for personal tax exemption with no restriction
- Deer: This card is for personal tax exemption with some degree of restriction

=== Hotel tax exemption ===
This is a tax exemption issued for purchases of hotel stays and other forms of lodging. The tax exemption card is required before paying for the lodging, if it is paid before acquiring it, or through the internet, the benefits are unusable.

==== Official mission tax exemptions ====
These exemptions might only be used for purchases necessary for the mission's functioning. The mission is only available to be exempt from tax if the mission has a valid tax exemption card, the stay is required in support of the mission's diplomatic or consular functions and the costs are paid with a cheque, credit card, or a wire transfer in the name of the mission.

==== Personal tax exemption ====
This card is issued only for the benefit of its holder and may not be used to benefit anyone else. The expenses are only exempt from tax if the person has a valid tax exemption card and the rooms are registered and paid only by the person holding the tax exemption card.

=== Other exemptions ===
Other exemptions in the US include those for vehicles, airlines, gasoline, utilities, and certain types of income.

== Historical uses ==
Gregory of Tours, in his history of the Franks, claimed that the people of the city of Tours were given tax exemption by the Merovingian kings on account of the presence of the relics of St Martin of Tours and suggested that divine punishment from the saint could fall on anyone who violated this to reimpose taxes.

The inhabitants of Domrémy-la-Pucelle in France, were given tax exemption when Charles VII of France received a request from Joan of Arc to exempt the community (which was her home town) from taxes. This community was exempt from taxes until the time of French revolution, when the republican government restored taxation.

In the Ottoman Empire, tax breaks for descendants of Muhammad encouraged many people to buy certificates of descent or forge genealogies. In the 17th century, an Ottoman bureaucrat estimated that there were 300,000 impostors; In 18th-century Anatolia, nearly all upper-class urban people claimed descent from Muhammad. The number of people claiming such ancestry – which exempted them from taxes such as avarız and tekalif-i orfiye – became so great that tax collection was very difficult.

== Fraud ==
Some organizations apply fraudulently for tax exemptions.

== See also ==
- Tax resistance
- Tax shelter
