= Canik (disambiguation) =

Canik is one of the main municipalities in Samsun, Turkey.

Canik may also refer to:

- Canik Mountains, Turkey
- Canik beyliks, a group of beyliks, Turkey, historical
- Canik Arms, Turkish firearms manufacturer.
