= Varvar Ali Pasha's Revolt =

- Part of Celali rebellions
Date	1647–1648
Location	Anatolia
Result	Revolt suppressed

Belligerents
Ottoman Empire	Followers of Varvar Ali Pasha

Commanders and leaders
(Ottoman Empire) Ibşir Mustafa Pasha	Varvar Ali Pasha (executed)

The Varvar Ali Pasha Revolt was a revolt led by Varvar Ali Pasha during his governorship of Sivas in 1647. Varvar Ali Pasha revolted after Ottoman Sultan Ibrahim demanded the hand of Perihan Hanım, the wife of Ibşir Mustafa Pasha, from Sivas, and ordered her to be brought to Istanbul. Varvar Ali Pasha refused to bring another man's wife to Sultan Ibrahim and did not carry out the order. He was removed from his post and sentenced to death. Varvar Ali Pasha prevented the soldiers assigned to kill him from entering the city. Although attempts were made to remove him from Sivas by inviting him to Istanbul, he refused to leave Sivas. Furthermore, attempts were made to weaken support for him by declaring him a Celali. Varvar Ali Pasha was attacked by İpşir Pasha, whose wife he had refused to hand over to Sultan Ibrahim. In response to this attack, Varvar Ali Pasha's army was scattered, and he was captured while trying to escape. İpşir Pasha had him executed, and Varvar Ali Pasha's severed head was sent to Istanbul. İpşir Pasha was then rewarded with the governorship of Aleppo.
