= Celali rebellions =

Rebellions by Anatolian irregular troops against the Ottoman Empire

Celali rebellion
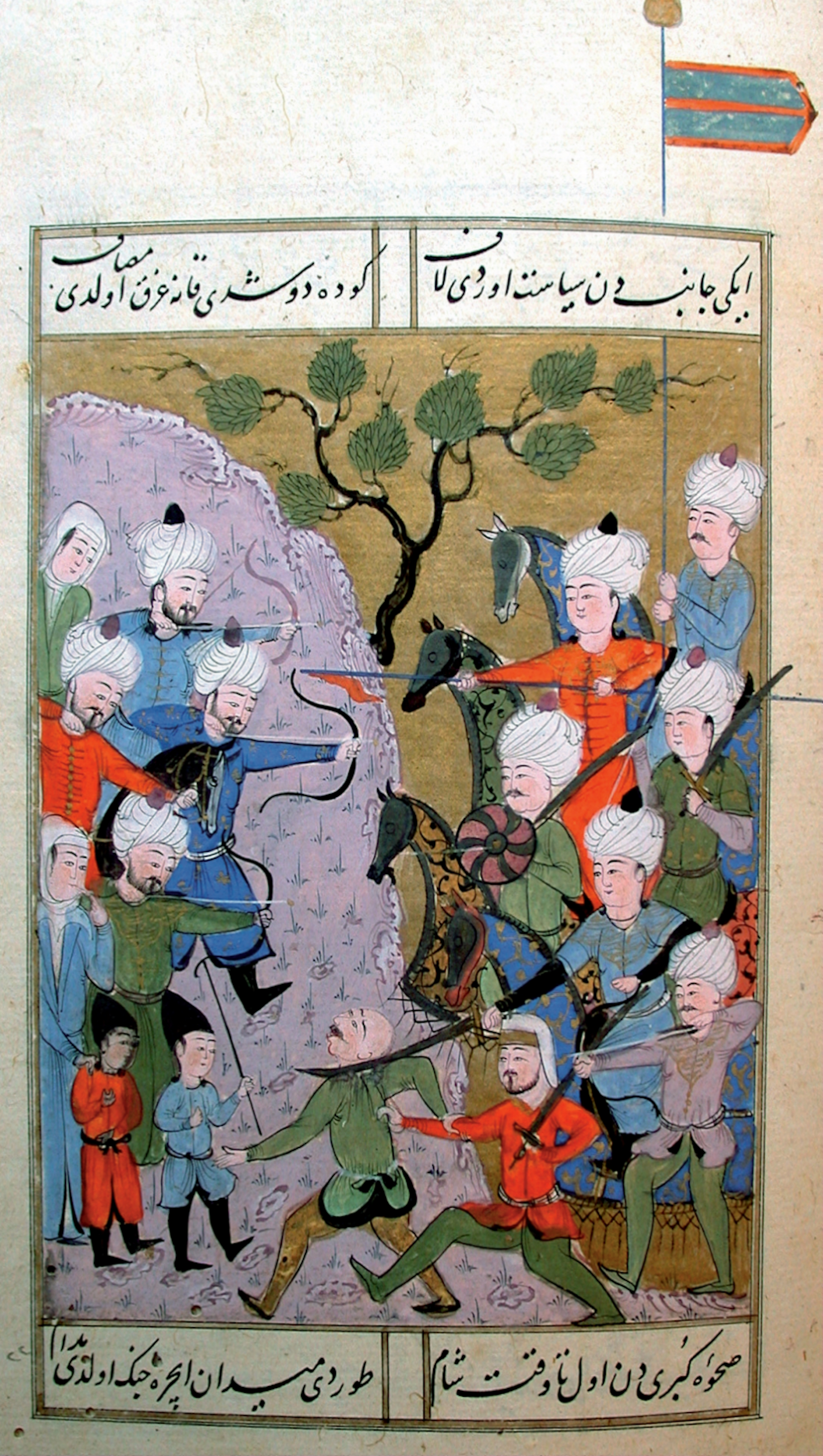
- The Celali revolt. Şükri-i Bidlisi, Selīmnāme-i Şükrī, probably Maraş-Istanbul, Topkapı Palace Museum Library, Ms. H. 1597-98, fol. 264a.
Date	Early 16th century 1595–1610; 1647–1648
Location	Anatolia
Result	Rebellion suppressed

Belligerents
Ottoman Empire	Celali rebels

Commanders and leaders
Selim I Suleiman the Magnificent; Mehmed III; Ahmed I Kuyucu Murad Pasha; Ibşir Mustafa Pasha; Tiryaki Hasan Pasha	Bozoklu Şeyh Celâl; Baba Zünnun Rebellion; Kalender Çelebi rebellion Katırcıoğlu Mehmet Pasa; Karayazıcı; Deli Hasan; Parmaksız; Ali Janbulad; Kalenderoğlu; Tavil Ahmed; Abaza Mehmed Pasha; Varvar Ali Pasha's Revolt

Strength
	20,000 Sekbans, 30,000 ex-Sipahis rebels under Karayazici; 50,000 cavalry (1602); 37,000 (1648)

The Celali rebellions (Turkish: Celalî ayaklanmaları) were a series of rebellions in Anatolia of irregular troops led by bandit chiefs and provincial officials known as celalî, celâli, or jelālī, against the Ottoman Empire in the late 16th and early to mid-17th centuries.

== Primary sources ==
Simeon of Poland travelled across the Ottoman Empire from 1608 to 1618, and covered the impact that the Celali rebellions had on the cities of Anatolia. Arakel of Tabriz chronicled events from 1602 to 1662. İbrahim Peçevi was a civil servant in Anatolia during the rebellions of Karayazıcı and Deli Hasan.

Eremia Chelebi was the grandson of a refugee from the conflict and was the first Armenian to write major works about Ottoman history. Kâtip Çelebi also wrote about the rebellions. Mustafa Naima wrote about the Celali rebellions a century after they occurred and was one of the major sources for historical study of the rebellions. Hüseyin Hüsâmeddin Yasar covered the Celali rebellions in the third volume of his History of Amasya; Mustafa Akdağ praised the sourcing, but was critical of its messaging, such as depicting the Celali as nationalist rebels.

Armenians commonly wrote long colophons about the Celali rebellions at the end of manuscripts. Sharia and Ottoman court records cover the period as well.

== Background ==
=== Celali ===
The word Celali means "belonging to Celal" and is derived from Bozoklu Celal (also known as Şah Veli), who rebelled against the Ottomans in 1519. The following rebellions, despite not being related to Celal's rebellion, were given the name Celali. The alternate spelling of Jelālī is also used. The rebellions never had a unified command and sought local power rather than changes across the Ottoman Empire.

=== Bandits ===
Banditry was on the rise by the end of the 16th century. The Ottomans were unable to militarily respond to these bandits due to the Ottoman–Habsburg wars and conflict with Safavid Iran. Garrisons organised into units of 30 to 40 men to suppress banditry were set up in response to demands from residents of Anatolia after the start of the Ottoman–Safavid War in 1578. Abbas the Great, the shah of Safavid Iran, launched an invasion into the region in 1603. The Ottomans later ceded land to the Safavids in order to focus on the Celali rebellion.

Nomadic and mercenary warriors were used by the Ottoman Empire since its inception. These auxiliaries always outnumbered the standing army and this difference grew in size after the Battle of Lepanto in 1571. The Ottoman government suppressed the timar and sipahi in the 16th century as inflation and armament developments rendered these feudal systems obsolete. Sekban and levend soldiers formed bandit gangs after returning from military campaigns.

Grigor Daranaḷts‘i, the second Armenian bishop of Rodosto and a refugee from the violence, wrote that the Celali rebellions were caused by Sultan Mehmed III neglecting Anatolia despite its corruption, unjust land seizures, and famine. Akdağ said that inflation and unemployed military forces caused the Celali rebellions. Karen Barkey wrote that the Celali "were not interested in rebellion but concentrated on trying to gain state resources, more as rogue clients than as primitive rebels". Halil İnalcık also supported the idea that irregular soldiers were trying to gain positions within the Ottoman state.

Sipahis earned money through their timar land grants. Suleiman the Magnificent issued a decree ruling that land grants greater than 20,000 akçe could only be given to Janissaries. Soldiers from Anatolia were initially not called up to fight in the Long Turkish War, but were summoned after the Ottomans experienced setbacks. Anatolians sought to avoid service due to the distance and their desire to protect their properties from bandits. Looting broke out in the eyalets of Anatolia, Karaman, Rûm, and Dulkadir after soldiers left for the war in 1594. After the Battle of Keresztes a roll call of the Ottoman military was conducted and discovered that 30,000 sipahis were absent and they were stripped of their timar in response. These sipahis became bandits in response to their properties being seized. Karayazıcı, an Ottoman official, rose to become a leader among these rebels.

=== Economic ===
By the end of the 16th century the Ottoman Empire was suffering from rising inflation. The akçe suffered from significant debasement in the 16th century and was devalued by 100% between 1584 and 1589. The price of foodstuff rose from 182 akçes in 1585, to 631 akçes in 1606. Avarız and tekalif-i orfiye taxes were increased in order to pay for the Long Turkish War.

The Little Ice Age negatively impacted agricultural production in eastern Anatolia. Famines and shortages occurred multiple times in Anatolia between 1564 and 1586 A drought occurred in eastern Anatolia in 1599, and this produced a famine in 1600. Another famine occurred from 1607 to 1608, and Arakel of Tabriz wrote about allegations of cannibalism during this famine.

Michael Cook noted that by the late 16th century the population of areas in rural Anatolia were greater than the amount of arable land for cultivation. Akdağ wrote that the population increase led to an increase in landless peasants. However, Huri İslamoğlu-İnan and other historians disagree about the existence of this population crisis.

== Rebellions ==
=== 1595—1610 ===
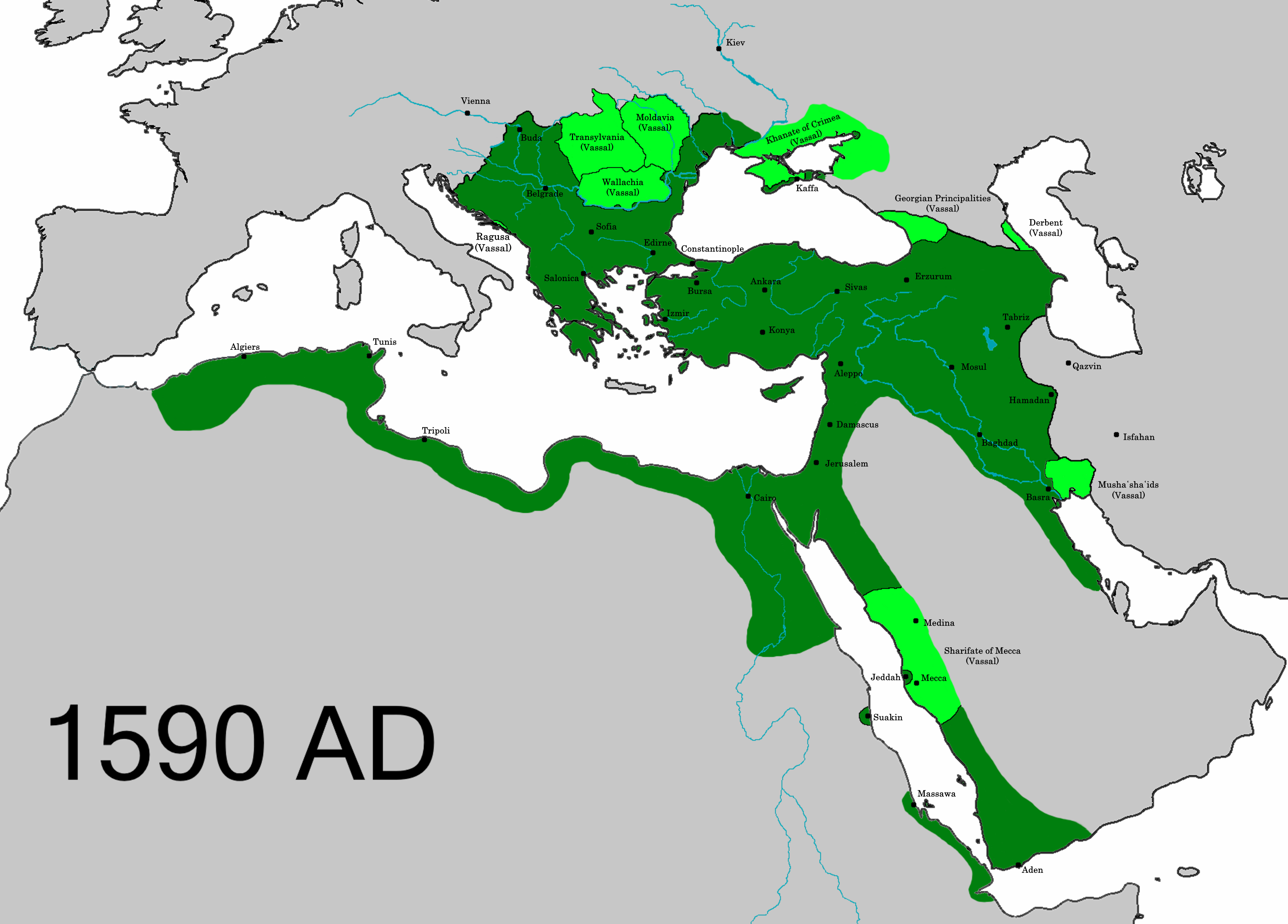
The Ottoman Empire in 1590, at the outset of the Celali rebellions.

Akdağ divided the Celali rebellions into two phases: one from 1596 to 1603 and the other from 1604 to 1610. Prior to this timeframe the size of bandit bands was in the hundreds.

The subject of the Epic of Koroghlu is a Celali rebel in the 16th century. Ottoman records reported that he was active in Bolu and Gerede. The basis of the character Koroghlu is unknown, but he could have been a composite of several people. Koroghlu was said to have been a soldier under Özdemiroğlu Osman Pasha in the Caucasus. He led a band of around 200 men starting in 1581. Grigor Daranaḷts‘i wrote that the Celali first rose up in Kemah around 1591.

Karayazıcı, a sekban leader, launched a rebellion in 1599, and led 20,000 men. Hüseyin Pasha, the former governor of the Habesh Eyalet, launched a separate rebellion in Karaman at the same time as Karayazıcı. Cerrah Mehmed Pasha was sent to fight the Celali rebels in August 1599, but was given novice soldiers as those with experience were fighting with Damat Ibrahim Pasha in Belegrade. Karayazıcı and Hüseyin united their forces after learning that Cerrah Mehmed Pasha was sent to defeat them. This combined rebel force took Urfa Castle and withstood an Ottoman siege. The Ottomans entered into negotiations with the rebels. Mehmed III made Karayazıcı the governor of Amasya Province and Çorum Province after Karayazıcı gave Hüseyin to the Ottoman government, but Karayazıcı continued his rebellious activities. Karayazıcı established a base at the fortress of Urfa. Sokulluzade Hasan Pasha, the son of Sokollu Mehmed Pasha, defeated Karayazıcı in July 1601, and Karayazıcı died near Canik in 1602.

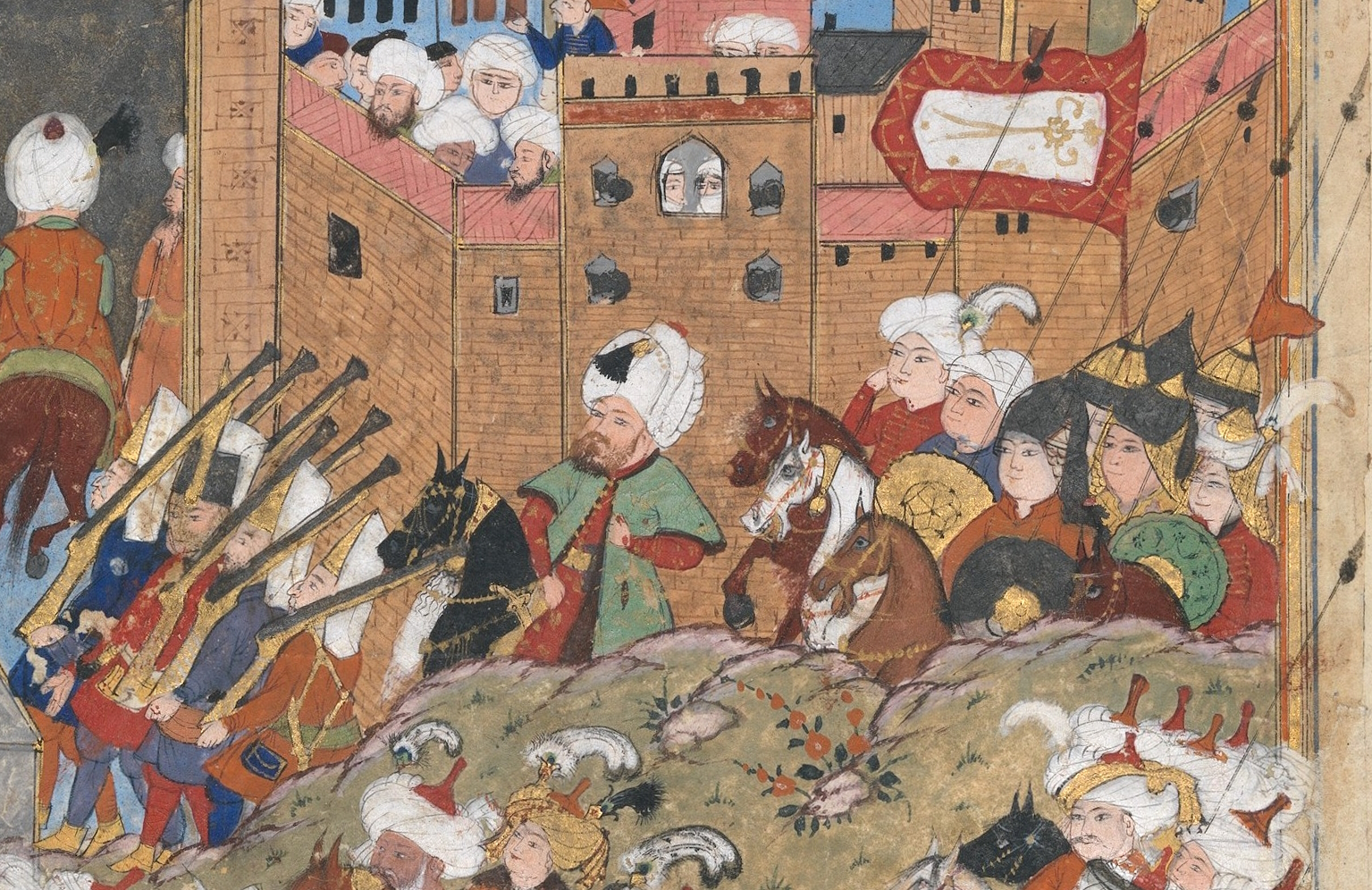
Sokulluzade Hasan Pasha (center) leading his troops in 1590. Divan of Mahmud Abd al-Baki, 1590–95

Deli Hasan, the brother of Karayazıcı, continued the Celali rebellion and commanded 20,000 soldiers. The Celali had 50,000 cavalry in 1602 according to Grigor Daranaḷts‘i. Hafız Ahmed Pasha was sent to protect western Anatolia, but was defeated at Kütahya in 1602. Deli Hasan was unable to consolidate the Celali rebel leaders like Karakaș, Tavil Ahmed, and Yularkisti. Deli Hasan defeated and killed Hasan Pasa at Tokat in 1602, and besieged Ankara. Mehmed III made Deli Hasan the beylerbey of Bosnia.

Bursa, the former capital of the Ottoman Empire, was sacked by the Celalis in 1607.

Arakel of Tabriz wrote that from 1605 to 1606, the Celali tortured and killed the inhabitants of Yerevan in search of provisions and supplies. At the Hovhannavank monastery the Celalis beat a friar and hung him from his testicles before he showed them the location of treasure according to Arakel of Tabriz; the friar was killed.

Kuyucu Murad Pasha was given the nickname kuyucu (well-digger) for the mass graves he created during his campaign against the Celali from 1606 to 1608. Prior to launching his campaign against Ali Janbulad in 1607, Murad Pasha offered Kalenderoğlu the governorship of the Sanjak of Ankara and he accepted. However, the people of Ankara were hesitant to allow Kalenderoğlu and his forces into the city and killed 30 of his men that were allowed in. Kalenderoğlu besieged the city, but was unable to take it and withdrew after Ottoman forces arrived. 80,000 Celali were killed by 1608.

In October 1607, Murad Pasha and Kalenderoğlu met north of Aleppo. Murad Pasha won the battle and beheaded tens of thousands of Celali soldiers, whose heads were thrown down wells; the heads of 48 Celali leaders were sent to Constantinople. In 1608, the Celalis were defeated at Alaçatı in August, and Şebinkarahisar in September. Kalenderoğlu was finally defeated near Marash in 1608.

=== Later rebellions ===
The rebellions came to an end as the weaker Celali were defeated and the stronger Celali were incorporated into the Ottoman government. Another rebellion did not occur in eastern Anatolia until Abaza Mehmed Pasha launched the Abaza rebellion with the support of sekban soldiers in the 1620s. The area fell into turmoil again during the reign of Mehmed IV. Haydaroğlu Mehmet and Katırcıoğlu Mehmet Pasha rose up in rebellion against Mehmed IV. Abaza Hasan Ağa captured Haydaroğlu.

Varvar Ali Pasa joined the Ottoman military in 1600, and served as governor of multiple provinces. As governor of the Rûm Eyalet he was ordered to send 30,000 kuruş to Constantinople in 1647, but was unable to pay this number. He also refused to deliver Ibşir Mustafa Pasha's wife from Sivas to Constantinople. Ali Pasha was dismissed from his post as governor and ordered to be executed. Ali Pasha rose up in rebellion and was considered a Celali by the Ottomans. Ali Pasha led 6,000 soldiers to defeat the forces of Köprülü Mehmed Pasha in 1648, and the size of Ali Pasha's forces rose to 37,000. The Ottomans offered Ali Pasha and Defterdarzâde Mehmed Pasha the governorship of Egypt in exchange for killing each other, but this was rejected. Ali Pasha arrived in Çerkeş and was attacked by Ibşir Mustafa Pasha, who he thought was coming to join him, on 20 May. Ali Pasha was defeated and executed, with his head being sent to Constantinople.

== Aftermath ==
Celali rebellions had completely altered the Ottoman land ownership in Anatolia. The Ottomans had levied significant sums of taxes from the peasantry in order to fund the campaign against Celalis. The peasantry who fled the rebellions lost their lands to the local administrators or mültezims. Those who did not were heavily indebted to the creditors. The timar system had been disrupted to its foundations. Major refugee waves appeared and headed towards the major towns of Anatolia and the hinterlands of Rumelia. The agriculture production in Anatolia had severely dropped and ensuing famine had caused extreme inflation. The situation was later described as the Great Flight (Büyük Kaçgun). The military class, especially Janissaries and Kapıkulu corps, had turned the abandoned lands into animal farms. Ottoman government had taken serious measures to return the lands to their true owners. The measures proved to be unsuccessful.

David, the Armenian Patriarch of Jerusalem from 1583 to 1615, acquired a debt of 40,000 kuruş as pilgrims, his main source of revenue, stopped coming to Jerusalem due to Celali raids. Grigor Daranaḷts‘i noted that the financial situation improved by 1616.

Most Anatolian towns had small garrisons before the Celali rebellions, but there was a significant janissary presence after the rebellions. Ankara, a wealthy city that was targeted by the Celali, constructed walls, an uncommon feature for an Ottoman city, and these were retained for over a century.

=== Refugees ===
The populations of Amasya and Kayseri declined by half between 1580 and 1640. Villages in Karaman Eyalet that were once prosperous and well-populated in 1583, were abandoned by the 19th century. Bingöl and Eğil were completely destroyed by the Celalis. The kaza of Harput reported a 90% decline in taxpayers.

Thousands of Armenians fled from their homeland due to the rebellions. Simeon of Poland noted that all 200 Armenian households in Egypt were refugees. He also wrote that half of the Armenian households in Tokat were either dispersed or killed by the Celalis and the same happened to 1,400 of the 2,000 Armenian households in Sivas. Armenian refugees were given permission to settle in the abandoned village of Kara Hamza, near Ergene, in 1606. Rodosto, which previously did not have a significant Armenian population, had one Armenian for every 3.5 Muslims by 1628. İzmir had no Armenians prior to the arrival of refugees, but this grew to 100 Armenian households by 1610-1611 according to Simeon of Poland, and Jean-Baptiste Tavernier reported 8,000 Armenians in the city in 1657. Constantinople did not have a significant Armenian population in 1550, but was a major cultural and demographic centre for Armenians by the end of the 17th century.

The Ottomans attempted to send Armenian refugees back to eastern Anatolia in 1609, and in 1635. Grigor Daranaḷts‘i, who led a group of Armenians to Kemah in 1609, noted that they struggled to restore the area due to poor governance, an ongoing famine, and the large amount of bandits; Grigor later fled after learning that a bandit chief was looking for him. Grigor reported that the area was still suffering from famine in 1627.

Garegin Srvandztiants, writing in the 19th century, noted that there were still a large amount of Kemah hamlets and villages in ruin from the Celali rebellions. Minas Gasapean, a local historian in İzmit, wrote in 1913 that almost all of the Armenian communities in the city originated near the start of the 17th century, with none being founded before that period.

== See also ==
- Abaza rebellion
- Sekban
- Janissary revolts
- Devşirme

== Works cited ==
=== Books ===
- Akdağ, Mustafa (1963). Celâlî İsyanlari (1550-1603) (PDF). Ankara University.
- Anderson, Betty (2016). A History of the Modern Middle East: Rulers, Rebels, and Rogues. Stanford University Press. ISBN 9780804798754.
- Faroqhi, Suraiya (2010). Coping with the State: Political Conflict and Crime in the Ottoman Empire, 1550-1720. Gorgias Press. doi:10.31826/9781463230067. ISBN 9781463230067.
- Faroqhi, Suraiya; Fleet, Kate (2013). The Cambridge History of Turkey: The Ottoman Empire as a World Power, 1453-1603. Vol. 2. Cambridge University Press. ISBN 9780521620949.
- Faroqhi, Suraiya; McGowan, Bruce; Quataert, Donald; Pamuk, Şevket (1994). An Economic and Social History of the Ottoman Empire: 1600-1914. Vol. 2. Cambridge University Press. ISBN 0521574552.
- Shapiro, Henry (2022). The Rise of the Western Armenian Diaspora in the Early Modern Ottoman Empire: From Refugee Crisis to Renaissance in the 17th Century. Cambridge University Press. ISBN 9781474479622.
- Woodhead, Christine (2011). The Ottoman World. Routledge. ISBN 9780203142851.

=== Journals ===
- Ágoston, Gábor (2014). "Firearms and Military Adaptation: The Ottomans and the European Military Revolution, 1450-1800". Journal of World History. 25 (1). University of Hawaiʻi Press: 85–124. doi:10.1353/jwh.2014.0005. JSTOR 43286061.
- Barkan, Ömer; McCarthy, Justin (1975). "The Price Revolution of the Sixteenth Century: A Turning Point in the Economic History of the near East". International Journal of Middle East Studies. 6 (1). Cambridge University Press: 3–28. doi:10.1017/S0020743800024302. JSTOR 162732.
- Demi̇rci̇, Süleyman (2003). "Complaints about Avâriz Assessment and Payment in the Avâriz-Tax System: An Aspect of the Relationship between Centre and Periphery. A Case Study of Kayseri, 1618-1700". Journal of the Economic and Social History of the Orient. 46 (4). Brill Publishers: 437–474. doi:10.1163/156852003772914857. JSTOR 3632828.
- Ergene, Boḡaç (2001). "On Ottoman Justice: Interpretations in Conflict (1600-1800)". Islamic Law and Society. 8 (1). Brill Publishers: 52–87. doi:10.1163/156851901753129674. JSTOR 3399486.
- Faroqhi, Suraiya (1992). "Political Activity among Ottoman Taxpayers and the Problem of Sultanic Legitimation (1570-1650)". Journal of the Economic and Social History of the Orient. 35 (1). Brill Publishers: 1–39. doi:10.2307/3632686. JSTOR 3632686.
- Kuniholm, P. (1990). "Archaeological Evidence and Non-Evidence for Climatic Change". Philosophical Transactions of the Royal Society A. 330 (1615). Royal Society: 645–655. Bibcode:1990RSPTA.330..645K. doi:10.1098/rsta.1990.0045. JSTOR 53613.
- Orbay, Kayhan (2004). "Celáli Recorded in the Account Books". Rivista degli studi orientali. 78 (1). Sapienza University of Rome: 71–83. JSTOR 41913167.
- Özel, Oktay (2004). "Population Changes in Ottoman Anatolia during the 16th and 17th Centuries: The "Demographic Crisis" Reconsidered". International Journal of Middle East Studies. 36 (2). Cambridge University Press: 183–205. doi:10.1017/S0020743804362021. hdl:11693/24291. JSTOR 3880031.
- Wilks, Judith (2001). "The Persianization of Köroğlu: Banditry and Royalty in Three Versions of the Köroğlu "Destan"". Asian Folklore Studies. 60 (2). Nanzan University: 305–318. doi:10.2307/1179059. JSTOR 1179059.

=== Web ===
- "CELÂLÎ İSYANLARI". İslâm Ansiklopedisi. Archived from the original on 20 July 2025.
- "Hüsrev Paşa, Deli". İslâm Ansiklopedisi. Archived from the original on 7 December 2023.
- "Jelālī Revolts". Encyclopædia Britannica. Archived from the original on 22 July 2025.
- "Varvar Ali Pașa". İslâm Ansiklopedisi. Archived from the original on 22 July 2025.
- Alford, Peggy (2022). "Great Jelālī Revolts". EBSCO Information Services. Archived from the original on 22 July 2025.
