= Ali Janbulad =

Kurdish tribal chief in the Ottoman Empire

Ali Janbulad Pasha

Beylerbey of Aleppo
- In office September 1606 – October 1607
- Monarch: Ahmed I (r. 1603–1617)
- Preceded by: Huseyn Janbulad Pasha

Beylerbey of Temeşvar
- In office 1608 or 1609 – April 1609
- Monarch: Ahmed I (r. 1603–1617)

Personal details
- Born: Kilis, Aleppo Eyalet, Ottoman Empire
- Died: 1 March 1610 Belgrade Fortress, Bosnia Eyalet, Ottoman Empire
- Parent: Ahmed Janbulad
- Relatives: Janbulad ibn Qasim (grandfather); Huseyn Janbulad (uncle); Haydar Janbulad (uncle)

Ali Pasha Janbulad (transliterated in Turkish as Canbolatoğlu Ali Paşa; died 1 March 1610) was a Kurdish tribal chief from Kilis and a rebel Ottoman governor of Aleppo who wielded practical supremacy over Syria in c. 1606–1607. His rebellion, launched to avenge the execution of his uncle Huseyn ibn Janbulad by the commander Jigalazade Sinan Pasha in 1605, gained currency among northern Syria's Kurdish, Turkmen and Arab tribes and expanded to include local Syrian governors and chiefs, most prominently Fakhr al-Din Ma'n of Mount Lebanon and his erstwhile enemy Yusuf Sayfa Pasha of Tripoli. Ali formed a secret military alliance with the Grand Duke of Tuscany, Ferdinand I, with the explicit aim of jointly destroying the Ottoman Empire and establishing the Janbulad family as the sovereigns of Syria.

Ali's burgeoning ties with several Celali revolt leaders, whose influence spanned central Anatolia, Cilicia and part of Mesopotamia, posed a major threat to the Empire at a time when it was at war with Austria-Hungary in the west and Safavid Iran in the east. The prospect of a foreign-backed, wide-scale rebellion in the Ottoman heartland prompted Grand Vizier Kuyucu Murad Pasha to launch an expedition against Ali. The latter publicly maintained his loyalty to Sultan Ahmed I throughout his rebellion and his practical control of Aleppo was formalized with his appointment as beylerbey in September 1606. Murad Pasha's campaign against Ali was ostensibly directed against the Safavids to avoid Ali's mobilization; Ali realized he was the grand vizier's target only when Murad Pasha's army routed his Celali allies in Cilicia and approached his north Syrian domains. The grand vizier's army of Rumeli and Anatolian troops routed and mass executed Ali's rebel sekbans (musketeers) at the Amik Valley in October 1607, but Ali escaped, first to Aleppo then to the Euphrates valley. Through the mediation of his uncle Haydar ibn Janbulad and other representatives, he was pardoned by the sultan in 1608 and appointed beylerbey of Temeşvar several months later. Machinations against him by the local elites and Janissaries there compelled him to seek refuge in Belgrade in April 1609. Murad Pasha ordered his arrest there in the summer and he was executed in March 1610.

== Family background ==
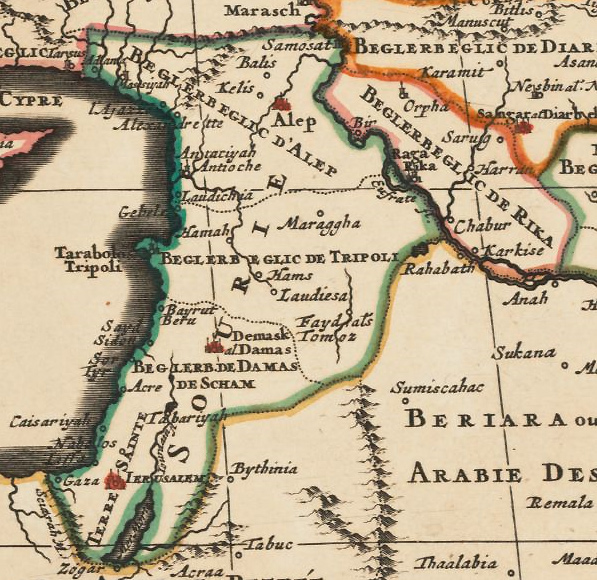
Map of Ottoman Syria (in French) c. 1600, showing the eyalets of Aleppo, Tripoli and Damascus

Ali was the grandson of Janbulad ibn Qasim al-Kurdi (d. 1572), the sanjak-bey (district governor) of Kilis, part of Aleppo Eyalet. Janbulad suppressed brigandage in the district and took part in the 1571 Ottoman conquest of Cyprus during the war with Venice (1570–1573). He belonged to a family of Kurdish tribal chieftains based in the Kurd-Dagh (Kurd Mountains) west of Kilis and Aleppo. The family name Janbulad translates from Kurdish as "soul of steel". Janbulad and his family were rewarded for their military achievements with the hereditary governorships of the sanjaks of Kilis and Ma'arra. According to the historian William Griswold, the hereditary appointments to the militarily strategic and lucrative posts were "generous and represented considerable respect" by the Sublime Porte (imperial Ottoman government in Constantinople) for Janbulad. He built at least one Sunni Muslim mosque in Kilis in 1562 before his governorship, and he or one of his family members built a bathhouse in the city.

After Janbulad's death his lands were bequeathed to his sons Huseyn and Habib. A third son, Ahmed, was Ali's father. Huseyn was a sipahi (fief-holding cavalryman) in Damascus and inherited the tribal emirate of Kilis, which he shared on a rotational arrangement with Habib. He participated in the 1578 Ottoman campaigns against the Safavids in Georgia and eastern Anatolia. Three years later he was appointed beylerbey (provincial governor) of Aleppo Eyalet, the first Kurd to attain the rank of beylerbey in Ottoman history and the first local to be appointed governor of Aleppo. In 1585 he was the lieutenant commander of Grand Vizier Sinan Pasha during the capture of Yerevan from the Safavid shah Mohammad Khodabanda. During his governorship Huseyn likely struggled against rivals seeking the post and accumulated debts. Not long after Yerevan, the Porte dismissed Huseyn and Habib from their Kilis and Ma'arra posts for unclear reasons, reassigning control of Kilis to a certain Kurd, Dev Sulayman. The authorities imprisoned Huseyn in Aleppo and sold his assets at a low price to pay back his debts and diminish his strength.

Upon his release Huseyn returned to Kilis and with his musketeers drove out Dev Suleyman and reclaimed his former hereditary lands. By 1600 he had accrued significant wealth and influence with the Porte, and a well-trained and well-compensated army of sekbans, as well as his Kurdish tribesmen and Turkmen and Arab tribal levies from northern Syria. Huseyn was reappointed beylerbey of Aleppo in July 1604. Aleppo was a particularly wealthy city and the revenues of its province amounted to about 3.6 million akces. Around one year later Huseyn was executed in Van by the order of the general Jigalazade Sinan Pasha for refusing join the campaign against the Safavids.

== Rebellion ==
=== Control of Syria ===
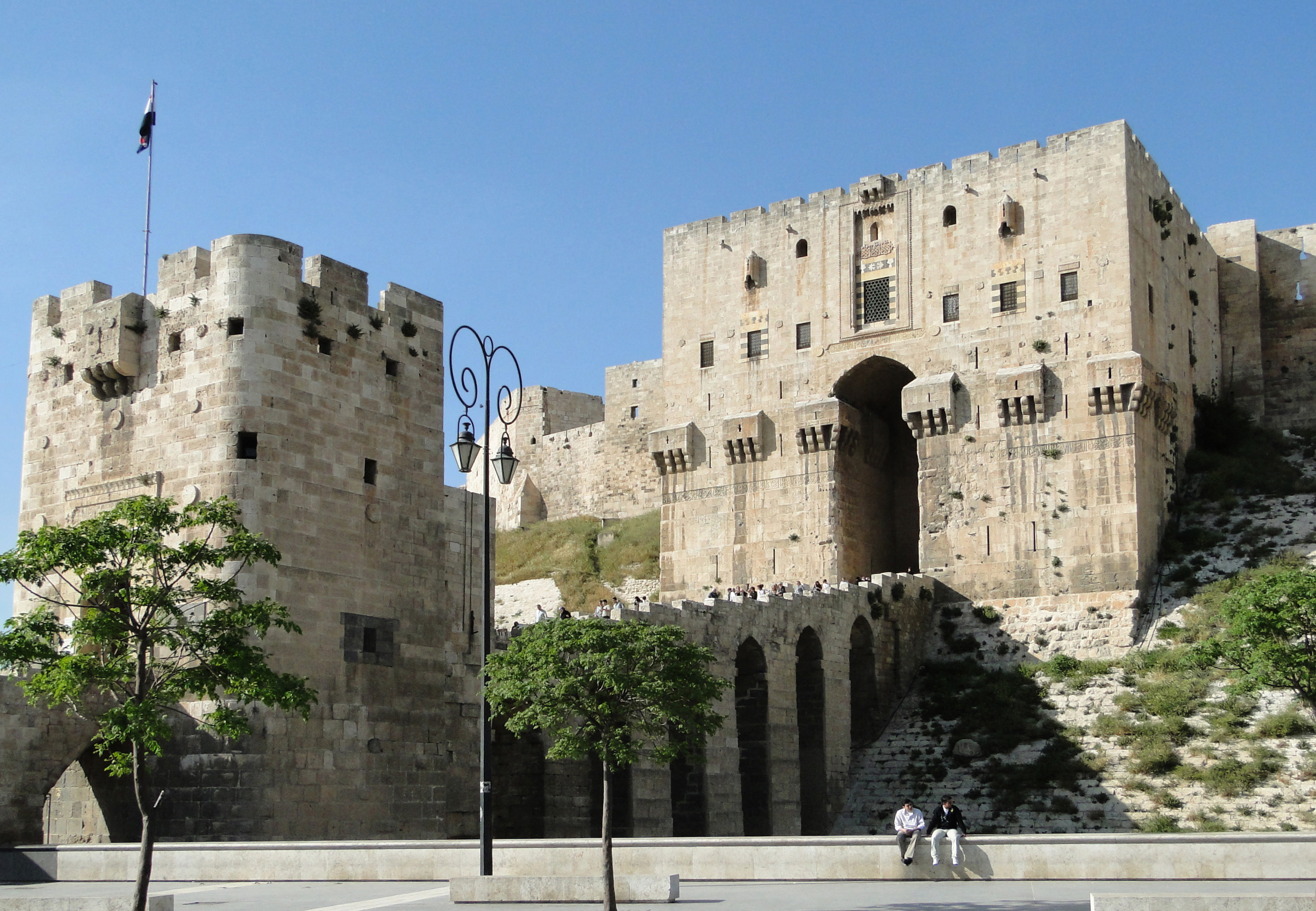
The citadel of Aleppo

Ali acted as a stand-in for his uncle Huseyn while the latter was fighting on the Safavid front. He had already established a reputation across Syria as "an experienced leader, an able, generous man" according to Griswold. His rebellion against the Ottoman authorities was expressly launched as a bid to avenge his uncle, whom he declared to have been unjustly executed; he insisted that he was not revolting against the sultan, but rather fighting as a loyal subject against the sultan's advisers and viziers—not least Jigalazade Sinan Pasha—whom he collectively accused of injustice. His cause for revenge gained wide currency among his Kurdish tribal kin and more generally throughout Syria. He engaged in a six-month struggle against local opponents in northern Syria and became the unofficial power in Aleppo. In May 1606 he had lodged a formal request to the imperial government for the governorship of Aleppo and a vizier post in Constantinople and pledged 10,000 troops to the Ottoman campaign against the Safavids.

The Porte responded to Ali's activities by encouraging and providing assistance to the beylerbey of Tripoli, Yusuf Sayfa, a natural opponent of Ali. As a result, Yusuf, a Kurdish chieftain with a local power base in his province and a career Ottoman official, sensed a dual opportunity: he could neutralize the Janbulads, whose hegemony he feared, and in the process gain significant prestige with the sultan for suppressing Ali without the costly intervention of an imperial army. The Porte agreed to Yusuf's request to head a campaign against Ali and promoted him to serdar (commander-in-chief) of Damascus. In a short battle near Hama on 24 July, Ali routed Yusuf's forces, which included the armies of Tripoli, Damascus and Hama, and put Yusuf to flight. While Yusuf escaped to Tripoli, the bulk of his allies joined Ali, who financially rewarded them to ensure their loyalty. He proceeded to plunder the countryside of Tripoli. To destroy Yusuf's remaining influence in Syria, Ali formed an alliance with Fakhr al-Din Ma'n, a Druze chieftain in Mount Lebanon and sanjak-bey of Sidon-Beirut and Safad, who was Yusuf's in-law and principal rival. One of the commanders of the Damascus Janissaries, Kiwan ibn Abdullah, seeking to undermine a rival Damascene commander, encouraged Fakhr al-Din to accept's Ali entreaty.

Ali and Fakhr al-Din met in the northeastern Beqaa Valley, at the source of the Orontes River, and devised plans to capture or kill Yusuf. Their first target was Tripoli, the principal source of Yusuf's wealth and strength, against which Ali dispatched his paternal first cousin Dervish ibn Habib, who captured the city. Although Dervish seized the valuables stockpiled in the inner citadel of Tripoli's castle, Ali strictly forbade the city's plunder in a bid to demonstrate to its inhabitants that his rule would be mild and generous. The minor emirs and sheikhs of Tripoli and its hinterland joined Ali, whose forces swelled to about 60,000 fighters. Yusuf had escaped to Damascus where he raised an army out of its imperial garrisons. On their pursuit of Yusuf, Ali and Fakhr al-Din captured Baalbek, the headquarters of a locally powerful Shia Muslim chief and old ally of Yusuf, Musa al-Harfush. They cautiously kept Musa on side, sending him to lobby military factions in Damascus to abandon Yusuf, but forced him to step down from his chieftainship in favor of his kinsman Yunus al-Harfush. They proceeded south through the Beqaa Valley and recruited a certain Ahmad of the Shihab clan based in Wadi al-Taym. Fakhr al-Din maintained his control of the Mediterranean ports of Acre, Haifa and Caesarea.

With northern and central Syria under his control, Ali demanded from the beylerbey of Damascus, Seyyed Mehmed Pasha, control of certain areas of Seyyid Mehmed's eyalet under Ali and his allies: he sought the Hauran for Amr al-Badawi, chief of the Bedouin Mafarija tribe of Jabal Ajlun, the southern Beqaa Valley to the Bedouin chief Mansur ibn Bakri Furaykh, and the restoration of Kiwan ibn Abdullah to his Janissary post–all of Ali's requests were rejected, though he demonstrated to his allies among the southern Syrian emirs and chieftains the benefits of his rule. Meanwhile, Ali issued excuses for his failure to remit taxes and continued to publicly assert his allegiance to the Ottoman sultan, whose government, unable at the time to rein in Ali's power, sent an envoy named Mehmed Agha with a pardon for Ali. The Kurdish chief may have interpreted the pardon as an imperial pass to continue his rebellion in Syria. Although control of Damascus would seal his paramountcy in the Syrian region, Ali was mindful of the city's distance from his Aleppine power base and its importance to the Porte as the Empire's main marshaling point for the annual Hajj pilgrimage caravan to Mecca. As such, instead of a full-scale assault, he resolved to pressure the city to surrender Yusuf to him. Aware of the internal divisions among the Ottoman military factions in Damascus, Ali and Fakhr al-Din besieged the city. A skirmish was fought on 30 September 1606, in which the Damascenes were bested. The defeated troops retreated behind the city walls, refusing to hand over Yusuf. Ali ordered a three-day plunder of the city's suburbs; to avoid Damascus experiencing the same fate, Yusuf and the Damascene authorities, led by the kadi (head judge), and local merchants bribed Ali 125,000 gold piasters to withdraw. Ali agreed and further opened Damascus to free trade with foreign merchants.

Meanwhile, Yusuf had escaped and taken refuge in Hisn al-Akrad (Krak des Chevaliers) near Homs. Ali and Fakhr al-Din proceeded north to besiege him, compelling Yusuf to sue for peace. The three leaders formed an alliance sealed by marital ties. Together they held absolute control of Syria, with Ali the strongest of the three. Nonetheless, Ali's supremacy over the eyalets of Aleppo, Tripoli and Damascus was reliant on his control of the Syrian emirs. Closer to his territorial power base Ali had the absolute loyalty of his Janbulad clan, followed by the Kurdish tribal beys and the nomadic Arabs of Kilis and Azaz. With the prospect of a full-scale civil war brewing in Anatolia and in the face of Ali's practical control of Syria, the Porte acceded to his request for the governorship of Aleppo, appointing him in September; his request for a vizierate was ignored. Ali practically proclaimed his sovereignty by having the Friday prayers read in his name, and likely minting coins as well.

=== Alliance with Celali rebels of Anatolia ===
To enforce his control over the Syrian emirs, Ali looked for allies among the Celali rebels of Anatolia. The Celali revolts were a series of rebellions beginning in the late 16th century. The revolts were precipitated by economic pressures in rural Anatolia stemming from overpopulation, a significant drop in the value of local silver and subsequent inflation, the inability of graduates from madrasas to find employment combined with the increasing availability of muskets among the peasantry. They posed a major challenge for the government, which was unable to suppress the revolts effectively. The government adopted a strategy in 1600 of temporarily accommodating rebel leaders through bribes or official appointments while making preparations to neutralize them.

Ali had maintained friendly ties with certain Celali rebel leaders, including Cemsid Bey of Tarsus, who had taken control of Adana and its vicinity, and Tavil Bey of Bozok, who was a recipient of Ali's financial aid. The Celali leader Tavilahmedoglu Mahmud, who controlled Baghdad Eyalet, made common cause with Ali. Ali saw in Baghdad a potential refuge where he could regroup. Ali also communicated with the major Anatolian Celali leaders Kalenderoglu Mehmed and Kara Said.

=== Alliance with Tuscany ===
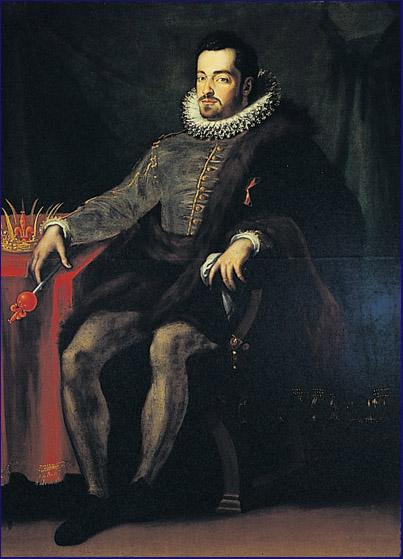
The Grand Duke of Tuscany, Ferdinand I, proposed a military alliance with Janbulad against the Ottomans, which Janbulad kept secret

To prop up his nascent Syrian state Ali moved to obtain recognition, as well as loans or trade revenue, from regional powers. In November 1606 the Duke of Tuscany, Ferdinand I, sent as envoys a Tuscan noble with close ties to Florentine merchants and King Philip III of Spain, Hippolito Leoncini, and an Aleppine-born dragoman Michael Angiolo Corai, who maintained close contacts with the Safavid Shah Abbas and the Aleppo Janissaries. Ferdinand sought to reconquer Cyprus for the Christians and had similar designs on the Holy Land, while also seeking commercial ties with Aleppo, the principal outlet for the export of Iranian silk and other commodities to European markets. The Tuscans had also been refused the capitulations and trading rights maintained by the French, English and Venetians with the Porte in Constantinople, and Ferdinand viewed the Aleppine port Iskenderun as a suitable Levantine harbor for his political and economic ambitions. Moreover, for a technologically advancing Tuscany the relationship with Ali and his vulnerable but geographically strategic domains served as an extension of their burgeoning imperialism. Aleppo would serve as the commercial link between Persia and their European domains.

Ferdinand's envoys came with significant gifts and proposed an alliance treaty with Ali. It explicitly stipulated joint efforts toward the weakening and eventual destruction of the Ottoman Empire, the strengthening of the Janbulad dynasty and recognition of Ali as "Prince and Protector of the Kingdom of Syria". It mandated a special status for the Tuscans in Syria, including free trade with Iskenderun, authorization for their sale of pirated goods, Tuscan residency rights throughout Syria and their subjects' governance by Florentine law. Janbulad was required by the treaty to assist a European conquest of Jerusalem and recognize the city's Christian denominational redirection to Roman Catholicism from the Eastern churches. The Tuscans also called for tax exemptions for Christian pilgrims compensated by Tuscany and permission for the construction of a Roman Catholic church in Aleppo. European signatories would include Ferdinand, Pope Paul V and King Philip III, among other Christian royals and pontiffs. Ali boasted to the Duke's representatives that he was poised to become an independent sultan of Syria. Ottoman and Safavid sources do not mention ties formed between Ali and Shah Abbas, who adopted a policy of allowing Celali rebels safe haven in his territory. Non-Ottoman and non-Safavid diplomats maintained that Ali sent the shah gifts to elicit Safavid sympathy.

=== Suppression by Murad Pasha ===
All of Ali's communications with non-Ottoman regional powers were kept secret, though the ties with Tuscany were likely uncovered by government spies and the failed Tuscan invasion of Chios in 1607 probably riled the new grand vizier, the Empire's most celebrated and feared veteran commander Kuyucu Murad Pasha. The extent to which the Ottomans had become alarmed at Ali's power and alliances compelled them to call a ceasefire with the Habsburgs. Given the approval of Sultan Ahmed I, Murad Pasha kept his plans for a campaign against Ali secret, with no contemporary record or reference in Ottoman official correspondence of Ali's disloyalty to the Empire or rebellion. He launched his expedition against Ali from Uskudar on 10 July 1607, ostensibly with the purpose of regaining territory lost to the Safavids.

En route through central Anatolia, Murad Pasha recruited minor Celali chiefs and executed ones he considered dangerous. Among those executed were one hundred men of Ali's ally Deli Ahmed, the rebel beylerbey of Karaman. Upon arriving at Konya the grand vizier informed troops the target of the campaign was Ali and the speed and severity of their march deep through Celali rebel territory was to avoid Ali's detection and counterattacks by him or his Celali allies. Although the prospect of a winter campaign was daunting, spending the winter months in temperate Aleppo encouraged his troops. He temporarily neutralized the strongest Celali chief of Anatolia, Kalenderoglu Mehmed, by appointing him sanjak-bey of Ankara. Before departing Konya, Murad Pasha sent notice to Ali demanding his loyalty. The grand vizier proceeded toward Adana where he routed the Celali chief and Janbulad ally Cemsid. With his victory he gained control of the Taurus mountain passes, which guarded Ali's north Syrian heartland, and the port of Adana.

Ali likely realized upon hearing of Cemsid's defeat his weakened position against the grand vizier. Although he was afterward authorized to appoint sanjak-beys to the sanjaks of Aleppo, at that point there was little time for the new district governors to consolidate their position. His appointee to Marash, Haydar Bey, was unable to oust the grand vizier's general Zulfikar Pasha from the post and the latter's forces remained positioned north of the Taurus Mountains against Ali. He also could not rely on his ally Tavilahmedoglu Mehmed, who had been besieged in Baghdad by government forces led by Nasuh Pasha in April–July 1607 and eventually killed. Meanwhile, Ali's domination of Damascus had come to an end in April with the appointment of his enemy as beylerbey there, Sinan Pasha's son Mahmud Pasha. Military assistance from Tuscany in the relatively modest form of five cannons and 1,000 musket barrels was also not slated to arrive for another six to ten months, while a Tuscan attempt to invade Cyprus, partly to support Ali, was repulsed in August. Ali publicly proclaimed in Aleppo that he served only Sultan Ahmed and threatened the grand vizier "would taste the strength of his army" should he proceed toward his domains. Although an opportunity to attack Murad Pasha's army as it crossed eastward past Misis presented itself to Ali, he left such an opportunity open to Kalenderoglu, not knowing the latter had reconciled with Murad Pasha. Ali determined the most favorable place to assault the grand vizier was the mountain pass of Bakras, where he dispatched his sekban to fortify themselves. Murad Pasha departed Adana in late September, crossed the Ceyhan River at Misis, but took an alternative northern route instead of the road leading through Bakras; the alternative route was about 100 kilometers (62 mi) longer than the southern Bakras route. Ali was taken by surprise upon Murad Pasha's arrival in the plains north of Kilis and that compelled him to revise his strategy away from the familiar hilly terrain of Bakras where his sekbans were most accustomed to fighting to the plains of Kirikan or east banks of the Afrin River where the grand vizier's field artillery was most effective.

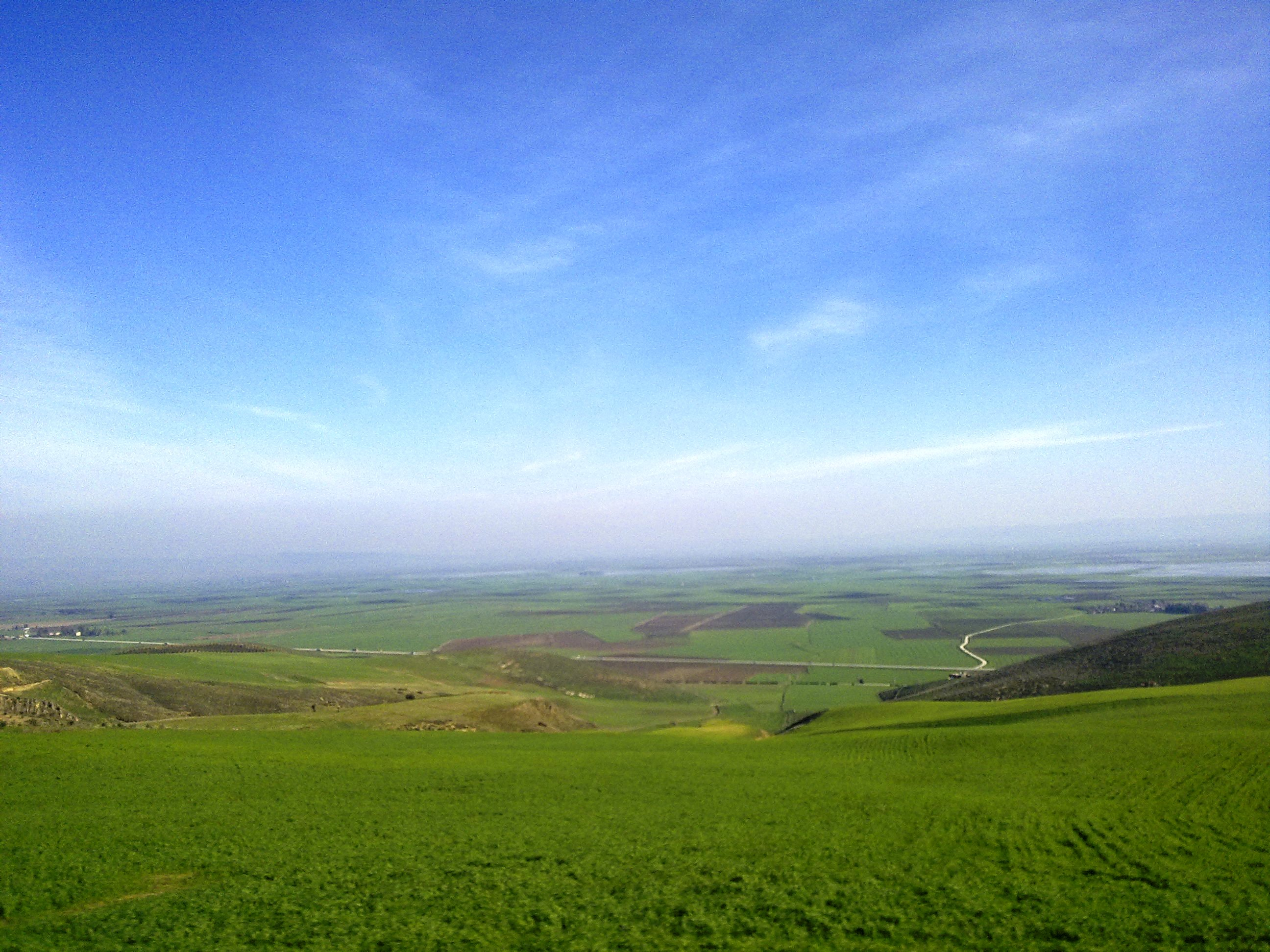
The Amik Valley, the battlefield where Janbulad was routed and his power in Syria brought to an end by the forces of Grand Vizier Kuyucu Murad Pasha.

Ali encamped with about 25,000 of his sekbans and other cavalries in the wide Amik Valley near Lake Amik. Zulfikar's patrols engaged with Ali's troops for three days while the grand vizier's army rested until 23 October when clashes culminated into a pitched battle. Although Ali's men killed the sanjak-beys of Kostendil and Selanik, his important lieutenant Jin Ali Bolukbashi was slain. Many other leading figures in Ali's army were taken captive in the battle and revealed to Murad Pasha Ali's explicit intentions to establish a sovereign state of his own based in Aleppo. Murad Pasha sent patrols to gauge Ali's strength and positions and on 24 October Ali, realizing the almost two-to-one disadvantage in strength, sent letters proclaiming his loyalty to the grand vizier and offering to meet him, which Murad Pasha rejected. The two armies encountered at Oruç Ovasi (the Meadow of the Ritual Fasting), a narrow area opening into a plain bound by mountains to the west and the Afrin River to the east. On the same day, Ali's forces charged against Zulfikar Pasha, whose forces absorbed the assault, before counter-charging. The day ended without a decisive victory for either side, though Ali's men had gained an advantage and demonstrated their strength. The following day Tiryaki Hasan Pasha put to use the imperial army's field artillery, hiding the batteries behind the slopes of Oruç Ovasi. He had the imperial infantry and cavalry feign a slow retreat, thereby encouraging Ali's sekbans to pursue them on the field and expose them to the fire of the hidden artillery. Ali lost significant numbers of soldiers in the artillery barrage, while Murad Pasha's Rumeli cavalry and reserve troops launched a counterattack with musket and cannon against Ali's remaining forces who could not see their commanders due to the smoke of the artillery. The counterattack and lack of visibility of Ali or his commanders induced the sekban to panic and flee. Ali could not rally the largely undisciplined sekbans and they were pursued, many being slain, while thousands were captured by imperial troops. Ali fled eastward and Murad Pasha ordered mass executions of captive troops, few of whom were pardoned, and then ordered a pyramid of 20,000 skulls erected in front of his camp next to 700 captured rebel banners, including Ali's white standard.

Despite the rout at Oruç Ovasi, Ali did not surrender. His Syrian allies Yusuf Sayfa and Fakhr al-Din did not participate with their forces, having returned to their local bases after Ali's Syrian campaign. Ali gathered his kinsmen in Kilis before proceeding to Aleppo and positioned hundreds of loyal soldiers with his kinsmen in the inner Citadel of Aleppo with two years-worth of food and supplies. Ali fled toward al-Bira with 2,000 men, hoping to link with the sons of Tavilahmedoglu Mehmed. They lost their power in Mesopotamia, however, and Ali's hope failed to materialize while his offer to join the Safavid shah was rebuffed. As Murad Pasha made his way toward Kilis and Aleppo, Ali attempted to seek the assistance of Sultan Ahmed. Murad Pasha confiscated Ali's lands and money in Kilis and appointed officers to posts once filled by Ali's loyalists. He arrived outside of Aleppo on 8 November and soon after, the city's officials surrendered. Ali's loyalists and associates were executed for treason. The forces in the citadel refused to surrender, compelling Murad Pasha to appeal to its inhabitants, especially Ali's wives, to spare themselves of his army's assaults and offer them clemency. A number of Ali's relatives were pardoned, but the rest of his kinsmen and soldiers were executed immediately after they surrendered.

=== Pardon, appointment to Temeşvar and execution in Belgrade ===
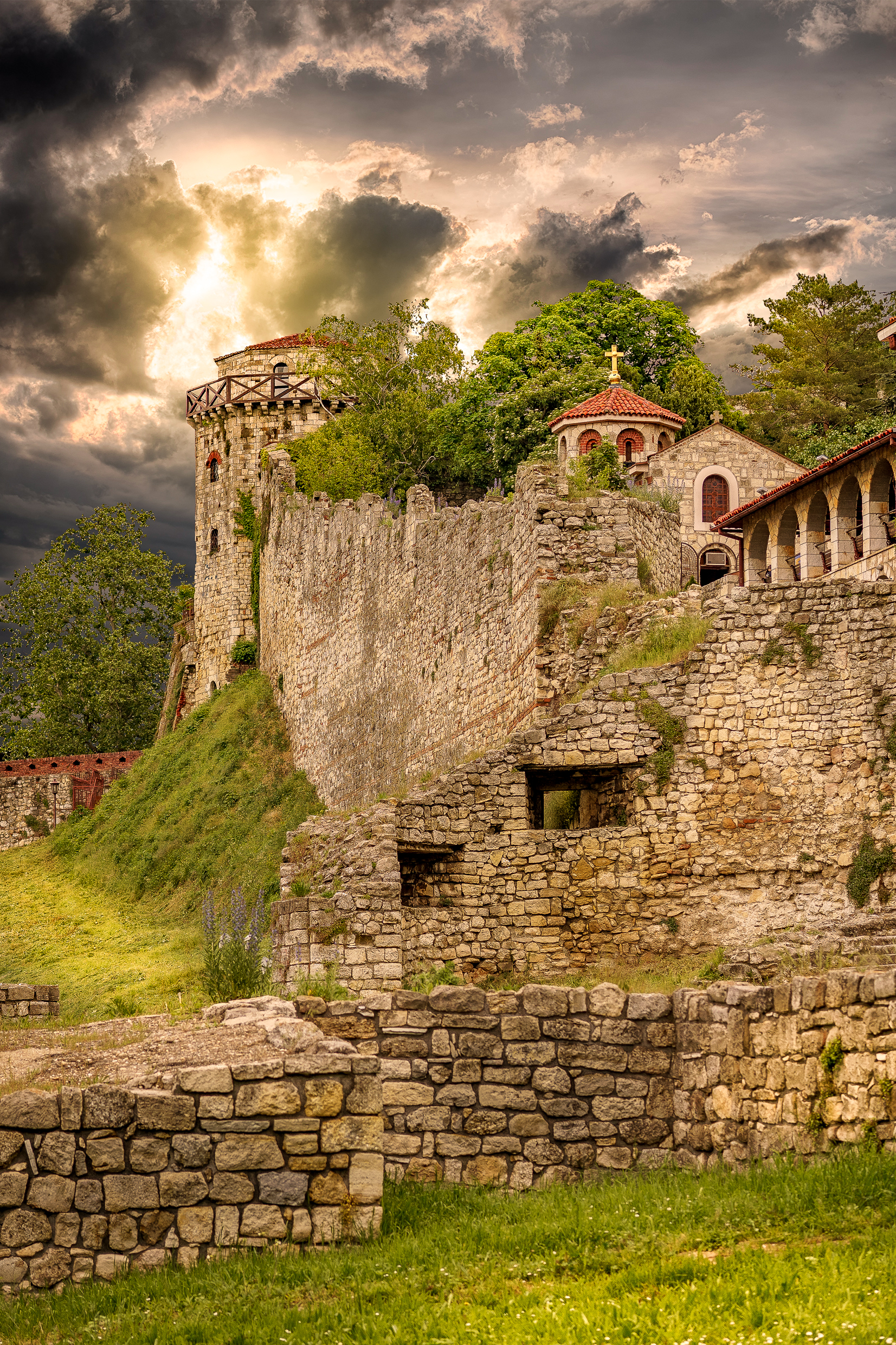
The Belgrade Fortress where Ali was executed on 1 March 1610

Ali sent his paternal uncle Haydar to Constantinople to arrange a reconciliation with the Sublime Porte, while Ali encamped at the hamlet of Pazarcık. From there, on 28 December, he reached out to the Celali chiefs, whose armies were encamped in the general vicinity. His invitation to Tavil was rejected, while his efforts to recruit Kalenderoglu Mehmed and Kara Said fell through as they were in negotiations with the grand vizier and refused to subordinate themselves to Ali's leadership. Sultan Ahmed was adamant to bring Ali to Constantinople to prevent his potential stirrings of the Celalis in Anatolia and sent a palace kethuda to summon Haydar and a ship to bring Ali's other envoys to the capital by sea. Once Ali's representatives were notified of Ali's pardon, they returned by ship to Iznikmid with a palace official to meet and transport Ali to the capital. He arrived there on 16 January 1608 to large crowds and was received by the sultan. While the sultan deliberated and questioned Ali for about a week, he resided in the former home of Grand Vizier Dervish Pasha. Upon the sultan's inquiry for why Ali rebelled, the latter replied

"I am no rebel. But around me gathered evil ones, from whom I could not escape, so that I led them in their revenge against your troops. Now I am in flight as one laden with guilt. If you forgive, then it will be worthy of you; if you punish, you will surely be within your rights".

Sultan Ahmed pardoned Ali and after an unknown period of time appointed him beylerbey of Temeşvar in the Banat region of the Balkans. There is no indication he acted against the Ottomans in Temeşvar, but the province's local elites worked against his rule in much the same way they were opposed to his predecessor Deli Hasan (d. 1605). The Janissaries of the province may have planned to eliminate him and the threat to his life was considerable enough to have prompted his flight to Belgrade in April 1609. Upon returning to Constantinople from his campaigns against the Celali rebels in Anatolia in the summer, Murad Pasha learned of Ali's circumstances and ordered his imprisonment in the Belgrade fortress. After several months the grand vizier was able to obtain a death sentence for Ali. The latter staved off the execution for at least forty days through his appeals but was decapitated on 1 March 1610. As customary, his head was publicly displayed in Constantinople.

== Legacy ==
Ali's family, the Janbulads, at least partly remained in their home region of Kurd-Dagh where until the present day traditional ballads are sung celebrating Ali. Part of the family may have been reestablished in Mount Lebanon where, according to the 19th-century chronicler Tannus al-Shidyaq, a certain Janbulad ibn Sa'id, possibly Ali's grandson, and his sons Sa'id and Rabah were received by Ali's old ally Fakhr al-Din in 1630 and settled in the Chouf village of Mazraa. Janbulad and his sons became close associates of Fakhr al-Din and the Khazens, a Maronite family in Keserwan, from 1631 until Fakhr al-Din's demise four years later. The family, which intermarried with the local Druze and converted to the Druze religion, became known as the Junblat (or Jumblatt), the Arabicized version of Janbulad. In the version of the 17th-century historian and associate of Fakhr al-Din, al-Khalidi al-Safadi, a certain "Shaykh Junblat" is mentioned in the Druze area of Mount Lebanon in 1614, though without any mention of a link to Janbulad or information about his origins. The modern historian William Harris notes "it is only clear that the name Junblat did not feature before the [Ali] Janbulad affair". The Junblat family emerged as one of the most dominant Druze clans and factions in Mount Lebanon's politics in the 17th–19th centuries.

== Bibliography ==
- Abu-Husayn, Abdul-Rahim (2009). Rebellion, Myth Making and Nation Building: Lebanon from an Ottoman Mountain Iltizam to a Nation State. Research Institute for Languages and Cultures of Asia and Africa. ISBN 978-4-86337-027-2.
- Bakhit, Muhammad Adnan Salamah (February 1972). The Ottoman Province of Damascus in the Sixteenth Century (PhD). School of Oriental and African Studies, University of London.
- Finkel, Caroline (2005). Osman's Dream: The History of the Ottoman Empire. London: John Murray Publishers. ISBN 978-0-465-02396-7.
- Griswold, William J. (1983). The Great Anatolian Rebellion, 1000-1020/1591-1611. Berlin: Klaus Schwarz. ISBN 3-922968-34-1.
- Harris, William (2012). Lebanon: A History, 600–2011. New York: Oxford University Press. ISBN 978-0-19-518-111-1.
- Maclean, Gerald M. (2004). The Rise of Oriental Travel: English Visitors to the Ottoman Empire, 1580 - 1720. Palgrave Macmillan. ISBN 978-0-230-00326-2.
- Masters, Bruce (2009). "Celali revolts". Encyclopedia of the Ottoman Empire. Facts on File. pp. 127–128. ISBN 9781438110257.
- Rondot (1965). "Djanbulat". In Lewis, B.; Pellat, Ch. & Schacht, J. (eds.). The Encyclopaedia of Islam, Second Edition. Volume II: C–G. Leiden: E. J. Brill. pp. 443–444. OCLC 495469475.
