= Siege of Kayseri =

Siege of Kayseri may refer to:

- Siege of Caesarea (260)
- Siege of Kayseri (1490)
- Siege of Kayseri (1651)
