= Canik Mountains =

Mountain range of northern Turkey

Highest point
- Coordinates: 40°59′59″N 37°15′53″E

Naming
- Native name: Canik Dağları (Turkish)

Geography
- Country: Turkey
- Provinces: Ordu; Samsun

The Canik Mountains (Turkish: Canik Dağları) are a mountain range in Turkey. The western part is in Samsun Province and eastern part in Ordu Province extending to the Black Sea.
