= Tekalif-i orfiye =

Tekalif-i örfiye was a type of taxation in the Ottoman Empire.

Tekalif-i orfiye was a blanket terms for several different ad hoc charges which were, initially, extraordinary taxes raised in war-time. They were variously paid in cash or in kind, and rates could vary (to an extent), depending on the community's ability to pay. By the time of the Tanzimat reforms, tekalif-i orfiye included ninety different excise taxes.

Tekalif dues became high in the 17th century. However, the Ottoman Empire's complex web of tax exemptions also touched on tekalif; taxpayers could be exempted for public service (for instance, by running a hostel for pilgrims), and sometimes a district's could be exempted due to exceptional hardship (for instance, if the district had already paid heavily towards other taxes, or been ravaged by warfare). Some Janissaries were exempted from tekalif-i orfiye although Janissary status could be effectively hereditary rather than a real military role.

A muafname might exempt a community from some or all tekalif-i orfiye.

== Other uses ==
Usage of the term "Tekalif" can be confused in places; "Tekalif" is a general term meaning "tax", but there were several different specific applications:

- Tekalif-i divaniye: Taxes of the imperial council, also known as "sovereign prerogative" taxes. These taxes varied very wildly, and were also called customary taxes as they often included elements of taxation from territories before Ottoman conquest. Avariz is an example of a customary tax.
- Tekalif-i örfiye: Extraordinary taxes (at least initially); their extemporised nature means that they were not always recorded in some tax registers.
- Tekalif-i kefere: The tax obligations of unbelievers, such as Christians.
- Tekalif-i bilavasıta: Direct taxes, after 1861
- Tekalif-i bilvasıta: Indirect tax, after 1861

Some documents may simply refer to "tekalif" without specifying which tax is concerned.
