= Şanlıurfa Castle =

Castle in Şanlıurfa, Turkey

- Coordinates: 37.1454°N 38.7840°E

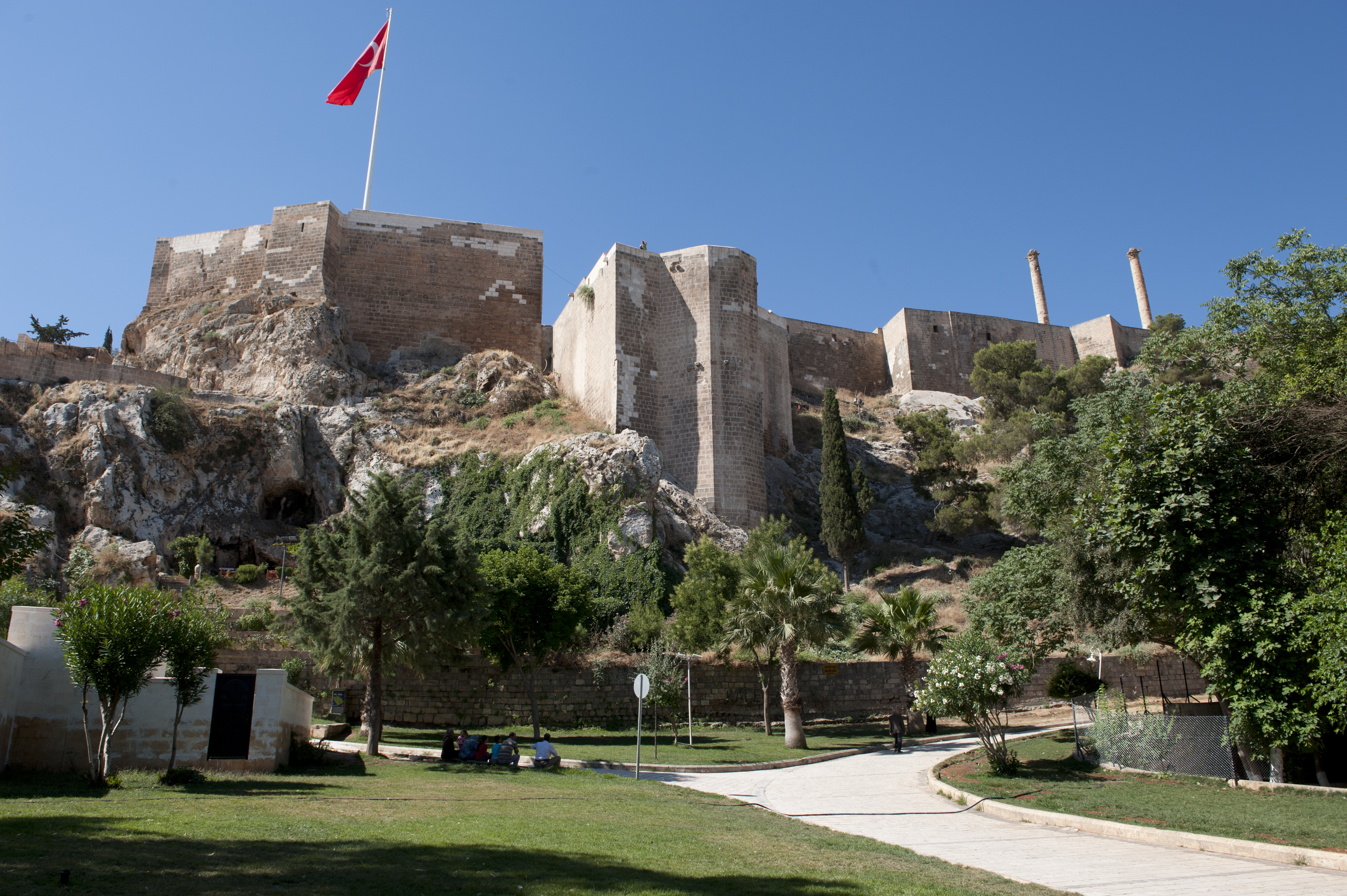
Urfa Castle with walls

Şanlıurfa Castle, or Urfa Castle in short, is a castle overlooking the city center of Şanlıurfa (previously Edessa), Turkey. The castle was built by the Osroene in antiquity and the current walls were constructed by the Abbasids in 814 AD. Today, the castle functions as an open-air museum.

During excavations at the castle, archaeologists uncovered a mosaic floor likely dating to the fifth century, adorned with Greek inscriptions as well as plant, animal and geometric designs. Nearby, several tombs were discovered, thought to belong to clergy who once served in the area.
