= Celali Deli Hasan =

Ottoman military commander (died 1605)

Celali Deli Hasan (Serbo-Croatian: Hasan Dželalija; died 1605) was an Ottoman military commander who after leading a rebellion in Anatolia became governor of Bosnia and then of Temeşvar.

After the death of his brother, a leading figure in the Celali rebellions, Deli Hasan took command of a group of rebels, soon numbered in the thousands, and established his power in Afyonkarahisar. He looted Kütahya and exacted tribute from Ankara. His success led to the Ottoman court bribing him back to loyalty with the rank of pasha and appointment as governor in Bosnia, where his followers were employed in the service of the state. He crossed into Europe on 2 April 1603, with an army numbering 10,000 men, and in May was taking part in the unsuccessful siege of Pest. His government in Bosnia was short and turbulent. In 1604 he was transferred to Temeşvar. The following year he fled to Belgrade after an attempt on his life, but was imprisoned there and executed.
