= Ibşir Mustafa Pasha =

Grand Vizier of the Ottoman Empire from 1654 to 1655

Ibşir Mustafa Pasha (Ottoman Turkish: ابشير مصطفى پاشا) was an Ottoman statesman of Abkhazian origin, nephew of the governor and rebel Abaza Mehmed Pasha, and prominent Celali rebel. He was grand vizier of the Ottoman Empire from 28 October 1654 to 11 May 1655. He was also the Ottoman governor of Damascus Eyalet (province) in 1649. He was a briefly damat ("bridegroom") to the Ottoman dynasty, as he married the Ottoman princess Ayşe Sultan.

As governor of Damascus he was defeated by Mulhim ibn Yunus, the Druze emir of the Ma'n dynasty in Mount Lebanon, in a battle at the Qarnana valley in November 1650.

== See also ==
- List of Ottoman grand viziers
- List of Ottoman governors of Damascus
- Waqf of Ibshir Mustafa Pasha Complex

Political offices
Preceded by Sofu Mehmed Pasha	Ottoman Governor of Damascus; 1649	Succeeded by
Preceded by Koca Dervish Mehmed Pasha	Ottoman Governor of Egypt; 28 October 1654 – 11 May 1655	Succeeded by Kara Murat Pasha
