= Sekban =

- Allegiance: Ottoman Empire
- Type: Mercenaries

Commanders
- Notable commanders: Yeğen Osman

The sekban were mercenaries of peasant background in the Ottoman Empire. The term sekban initially referred to irregular military units, particularly those without guns, but ultimately it came to refer to any army outside the regular military. The sekbans were not only loyal to the Ottoman state, but they could become loyal to anyone who paid them a sufficient salary.

These troops were maintained by raising a tax called the sekban aqçesi. They were recruited in such numbers that they became the most numerous component of the imperial armies. The use of these troops ultimately led to grave consequences: the end of hostilities, as in the war against Persia in 1590 and the war against Austria in 1606, saw a large number of sekban without employment or means of livelihood. As a result, many of these soldiers took to brigandage and revolt, and they plundered much of Anatolia between 1596 and 1610.

Rivalries between the janissaries and the sekban ultimately resulted in a rebellion. After the janissaries had been defeated on the Rumelian front, they marched on Istanbul in 1687 to depose Mehmed IV. The latter appointed Yeğen Osman Aga, a self-made sekban commander, to hold the janissaries in check. Yeğen Osman failed to accomplish this however, and Mehmed IV was deposed.

His successor, Suleyman II, continued the policy of his predecessor, making Yeğen Osman governor-general of Rumelia. Yeğen Osman, by then a Pasha, then attempted to become grand vizier. When this happened, the incumbent grand vizier outlawed the sekban corps, threatening soldiers who proved unwilling to disperse with execution, and a civil war ensued.

The sekban gained the upper hand, but a further volte-face of the Ottoman central administration saw Yeğen Osman captured and executed. This did not end the sekban rebellions, and while in 1698 the Sultan reached an agreement with the sekban, extending them guarantees in return for future good behaviour, the agreement was rapidly broken, and sekban rebellions continued throughout the 18th century.

== See also ==
- Sekbanbaşı Mosque
