= Battle of Dyrrhachium (1018) =

Battle between the Bulgarians and the Byzantine Empire

Coordinates: 41°19′32″N 19°27′16″E

- Part of the Byzantine–Bulgarian wars
| Date | February, 1018 |
| Location | near Dyrrhachium, modern Albania |
| Result | Byzantine victory |

Belligerents
| First Bulgarian Empire | Byzantine Empire |

Commanders and leaders
| Emperor Ivan † | Nicetas Pegonites; David Arianites |

Strength
| Unknown | Unknown |

Casualties and losses
| Unknown | Unknown |

The Battle of Dyrrhachium in February 1018 was a part of the Byzantine–Bulgarian wars. It happened as the Bulgarian tsar Ivan Vladislav tried to establish his power on the southeastern coast of the Adriatic Sea. He led an army against Dyrrhachium (present-day Durrës, in Albania) and besieged it, but was killed during a counterattack of the city’s defenders.

This was the final battle of the centuries long struggle between the First Bulgarian Empire and Byzantium. Within months after Vladislav’s death most of his realm was subjugated by the Byzantine emperor Basil II, with the last independent region (Sirmium) subdued in 1019.

== Historical background ==
After the battle of Kleidion and the death of tsar Samuil in 1014 the Bulgarian state was destabilized by internal turmoil. In the year that followed, tsar Gavril Radomir, Samuel’s son and heir, was killed by his cousin, Ivan Vladislav, at the instigation of the Byzantine emperor. The new Bulgarian ruler negotiated a brief peace as he promised to submit to Basil II in return for the control over Dyrrhachium. Neither side kept its promises and the war broke out again in the autumn of 1015. While Vladislav attacked Dyrrhachium, Basil II captured his capital Ohrid, but later, as a result of the Battle of Bitola, was forced to abandon it.

The war continued for two more years without a decisive outcome. In 1017 Basil defeated the Bulgarians at Setina, near Edessa, but failed to exploit his victory and returned to Constantinople. Vladislav took advantage of this to launch another assault against Dyrrhachium, which was defended by the strategus Nicetas Pegonites. In the battle that ensued after a sortie of the garrison the Bulgarian tsar was killed and his troops were forced to retreat.

This event prompted the majority of the Bulgarian nobles (boyars) to surrender to Basil. The isolated resistance was suppressed and Bulgaria became a Byzantine province.

== Sources ==
- John Skylitzes, Synopsis Historion, Excerpt describing the conquest of Bulgaria in 1014-1018 (Bozhinov, V. and L. Panayotov: Macedonia. Documents and Materials, Sofia 1978; online edition Books about Macedonia, retrieved on September 20, 2008)
- Chronicle of the Priest of Duklja (partial translation by Paul Stephenson), part 2, chapter XXXVI, p. 341 - an alternative account, according to which Vladislav was killed by Saint John Vladimir (retrieved on September 20, 2008)
