= Battle of Setina =

Coordinates: 40°52′N 21°37′E

- Part of the Byzantine–Bulgarian wars
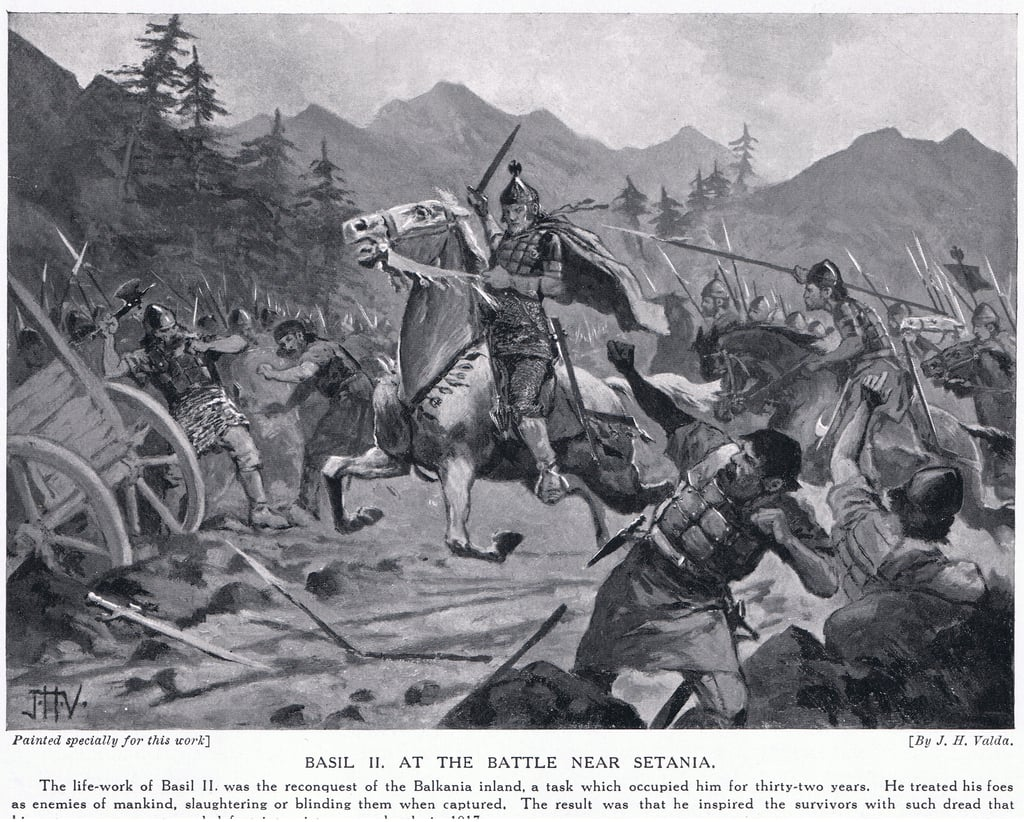
- John Harris Valda: Basil II at battle near Setania (Setina) in 1017
Date	Autumn, 1017
Location	near Setina, modern Greece
Result	Byzantine victory

Belligerents
Bulgarian Empire	Byzantine Empire

Commanders and leaders
Ivan Vladislav	Basil II; Constantine Diogenes

Strength
Unknown	Unknown

Casualties and losses
Destructive, 200 POW	Unknown

The Battle of Setina (Bulgarian: Битка при Сетина) took place in the autumn of 1017 near the village of Setina in modern northwestern Greece between the armies of the Bulgarian Empire and Byzantine Empire. The result was aByzantine victory.

== Prelude ==
In 1014, after decades of war, the Byzantine Emperor Basil II scored a decisive victory over the Bulgarian Tsar Samuel in the battle of Kleidion. Samuel died of a heart attack on 6 October 1014 and the Byzantines took the opportunity to penetrate deep into Macedonia, the political heart of the Bulgarian Empire, and seized a number of important cities (Bitola, Prilep, Voden, Maglen). After the new Bulgarian Tsar Ivan Vladislav, who in 1015 assassinated Samuel's son and heir Gavril Radomir, had unsuccessfully tried to make an agreement with Basil II, he organized the defense of the country. The Bulgarians led by the Emperor, Krakra of Pernik and Ivats managed to return a number of towns and castles. The Byzantines were defeated in the battle of Bitola (September 1015) and at the siege of Pernik (summer of 1016).

== The war in 1017 ==
In 1017 Basil II invaded Bulgaria with a large army including Rus' mercenaries. His objective was the town of Kastoria which controlled the road between Thessaly and the coast of modern Albania. He sent parts of his army under the commanders Constantine Diogenes and David Arianites to loot Pelagonia. Basil II himself managed to capture several minor Bulgarian castles but all attempts to seize Kastoria remained futile.

Meanwhile, the governor of Pernik and Sofia Krakra gathered troops to attack north-eastern Bulgaria which was under Byzantine control since 1001. He had orders by Ivan Vladislav to negotiate with the Pechenegs a joint campaign against the Byzantines. Upon hearing word of the negotiations, Basil II retreated from Kastoria. However, the Bulgarian counter-attack towards Moesia did not take place after the Pechenegs' refusal to back it. Basil II again invaded Bulgaria and took the small fortress of Setina located between Ostrovo and Bitola to the south of the river Cherna.

The Bulgarians under the command of Ivan Vladislav marched to the Byzantine camp. Basil II sent strong units under Diogenes to repulse the Bulgarians but the troops of the Byzantine commander were ambushed and cornered. To save Diogenes, the 60-year-old Byzantine Emperor moved on with the rest of his army. When the Bulgarians understood that they retreated chased by Diogenes. According to the Byzantine historian John Skylitzes the Bulgarians had many casualties and 200 were taken prisoners.

== Aftermath ==
The battle of Setina had no effect on the outcome of the war. In January 1018 Basil II withdrew to his capital Constantinople. The Bulgarians attacked the Adriatic port of Dyrrhachium and after Ivan Vladislav's death under the walls of the city the resistance finally broke. In the same year the First Bulgarian Empire was annexed by the Byzantine Empire. In 1019 the Byzantines seized the last Bulgarian strongholds.

== See also ==
- Byzantine-Bulgarian Wars
- Battle of Kleidion
