= Theme of Serbia =

- Former subdivision of the Byzantine Empire
- 1018–1039
- Capital: Ras
- Demonym: Serbs
- Status: théma
- Government
- strategos
  - 1018–1022: Constantine Diogenes
  - 1027–1029: Constantine Diogenes
  - 1036–1039: Theophilos Erotikos
- History
  - Established: 1018
  - Disestablished: 1039
- Subdivisions
  - Type: župa
- Today part of: Serbia, Bosnia and Herzegovina

The theme of Serbia was a Byzantine théma, a military-civil province (main administrative division), that existed in the first half of the 11th century (roughly 1018–1039) in what is today Serbia and Bosnia and Herzegovina. Although a military district was established, the local Slavic power structure was never compromised.

== Background ==
The information on Serbia as a political entity in the 10th century ends with De Administrando Imperio and Serbian ruler Časlav. The Byzantine empire conquered the Ras fortress during the reign of John I Tzimiskes (969–976), during the Byzantine–Russian war in the Balkan interior over Bulgaria. Bulgaria was conquered in 971 and the Byzantine empire stretched to the Danube. Although no strategos of Morava is mentioned in the Escorial Taktikon (971–975), the seal of Adralestos Diogenes, protospatharios and strategos of Morava has been preserved. The Byzantines established control over Ras, evident in the seal of protospatharios and katepano John of Ras (Greek: tou Rasou).

The fate of the Ras fortress is unknown in the reigns of Samuel and his successors (976–1018), but it surely became part of the Bulgarian state. The Chronicle of the Priest of Duklja claims that after the death of Tzimiskes (976), there was a rebellion instigated by the ruler of Duklja, after which "all of Rascia" (Serbia) came under his rule. There was a Bulgarian uprising in the following decade led by the Kometopouloi brothers that led to the control of vast territory of the former Bulgarian empire, spreading to the Danube banks, including the region of Morava and Braničevo. It is probable that after the Kometopouloi rebellion, the ruler of Duklja took the opportunity to expand into Serbia in the hinterland.

Serbian deputies to the Byzantine emperor (Greek: σέρβους κρατηθήναι) are mentioned in an Athonite charter dated 993. The seal of Peter, komistes (guardian) and archon of Serbia dating to the beginning of the 11th century, speaks of an hitherto unknown Byzantine vassal and Serbian ruler, prior to the officials (patrikios, vestarches, protospatharios, strategos) of the theme of Serbia in the 11th century. Until 1016, Duklja and parts of the Serbian hinterland were ruled by Jovan Vladimir, as Skylitzes mentions him "governing Triballia and neighbouring regions of Serbia" ("Τριβαλίας καὶ τῶν ἀγχοτάτω Σερβίας μερῶν ἦρχε Βλαδιμιρός").

== History ==
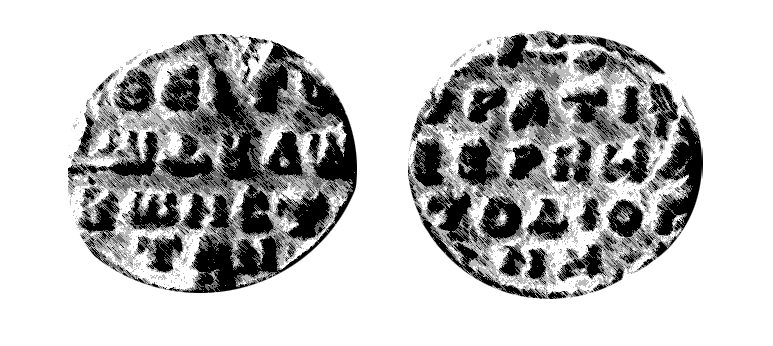
Seal of Constantine Diogenes, strategos of Serbia.

Basil II recaptured Ras in 1016–1018, and the region became part of the thema of Serbia. This is confirmed by Basil's reorganization seen in the second sigillion to the Archbishopric of Ohrid (1020). The devaluation of the military commander in Serbia from katepan to strategos is a result of decades of discontinuity of Byzantine rule in the region and also new circumstances in which Basil II built his power and placed Serbia. There was a prevailing view that the theme of Serbia was in fact the Theme of Sirmium and surrounding areas, however, Constantine Diogenes's "newly conquered areas" from Sermon were likely the area between the Danube and Sava, and the thema of Serbia was in the "Serbian hinterland" (so-called Rascia and Bosnia). Skylitzes speaks of Diogenes as being "archon of those regions" prior to the conquest of Sirmium (1019), likely meaning he was strategos of Serbia, the neighbouring province from where he set out to take Sirmium, in 1018/1019. Two seals belonging to the strategos of Serbia has been found at Ras. Although a military district was established, local Slavic power structure was never compromised.

Between 1018 and 1034 there was continuity of Byzantine rule in Serbia. Constantine Diogenes served as strategos of Serbia in 1018/1019, after which he became the military commander at Sirmium and some other official governed Serbia. There was a Serbian rebellion following the death of emperor Romanos III Argyros (1034), after which Serbia was subdued in 1036. In the 1034–1036 rebellion in Serbia, Stefan Vojislav participated and was captured and sent to Constantinople. The idea of developing a thema of Serbia was abandoned and the title of strategos passed to local aristocracy. In a charted dated July 1039 the ruler of Zahumlje, Ljutovid, styled himself strategos of Serbia and Zahumlje, which suggests he was awarded nominal rights over neighbouring lands.

Some time before 1040, Stefan Vojislav fled imprisonment at Constantinople and took over "the land of the Serbs" and expelled Theophilos Erotikos. Vojislav's rebellion began in continental Serbia (later called "Raška"); Vojislav then took over the "Illyrian mountains", the "Tribals" (Duklja), and the "Illyrian coasts" (southern Dalmatia), where he seized "Imperial gold". After refusing to hand over the gold, the emperor sent a punitive expedition under George Probatas which failed. Vojislav then attacked and looted neighbouring Byzantine vassal territories which led to Constantine IX sending a second punitive expedition under archon Michael of Dyrrachion in 1042, which also failed. Judging by the LPD, by 1042, none of the Serbian lands were under Byzantine control.

== Strategoi ==
- Constantine Diogenes, strategos of Serbia (t. 1018/1019)
- Theophilos Erotikos, strategos of Serbia (1036–1039)
- Ljutovid, nominal strategos of Serbia (fl. 1039)
- Nicholas Dermokaites, protospatharios and strategos of Serbia (mid-11th century)
- Nixas, protospatharios and strategos of Serbia (11th century)

== Aftermath ==
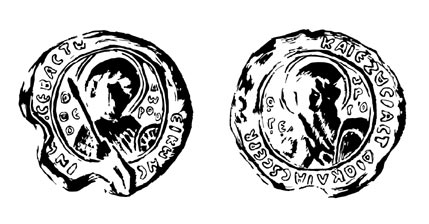
Constantine Bodin, "protosebastos and exousiastes of Diokleia and Serbia".

Serbia and Duklja constituted one state since Stefan Vojislav's rebellion in 1039/1040–1042. Ioannes Skylitzes calls Stefan Vojislav "archon of the Serbs" (Greek: Στέφανος ὀ καὶ Βοϊσθλάβος, ὀ τῶν Σέρβων ἄρχων), and describes how Mihailo "after his father became archegos of the Tribals and Serbs" and that he signed peace with Constantine IX (r. 1042–1055). Anna Komnene (1083–1153) called Mihailo and Constantine Bodin (r. 1081–1101) the "Exarchs of Dalmats [i.e. Serbs]" (έξάρχους τῶν Δαλματῶν). The prevalent opinion in historiography is that Serbia remained under Byzantine rule until the 1080s when Constantine Bodin conquered and appointed Vukan and Marko (the founders of the Vukanović dynasty) to rule in Serbia, as per the Chronicle of the Priest of Duklja. This is dated to between the Norman invasion which began in 1081, and the death of Robert Guiscard (1085), however, the newly found seal of Constantine Bodin which dates to the beginning of his reign (1081) clearly shows that he already held rule also over Serbia.

From the late 11th- to late 12th century the area of Belgrade, Braničevo and Niš constituted a single Byzantine administrative unit.

== See also ==
- Theme of Sirmium
- Theme of Bulgaria

== Annotations ==
1. Constantine Diogenes served as the strategos of Serbia in 1018/1019. During the Pecheneg invasion of 1026, Constantine Diogenes, as archon of Sirmium, was also appointed doux of Bulgaria. In 1029, Diogenes left Sirmium for Thessaloniki where he served as doux; at this point, he held no reign over Bulgaria nor Serbia, and his seal, "anthypatos, patrikios and doux of Thessalonica, Bulgaria and Serbia", is only an accumulation of his titles.
2. "protospatharios epi tou Chrysotriklinou, hypatos, strategos of Serbia and Zahumlje" (July 1039).

== Sources ==
- Ivanišević, Vujadin; Krsmanović, Bojana (2013). "Byzantine seals from the Ras fortress" (PDF). Зборник радова Византолошког института [Recueil des travaux de l'Institut d'études byzantines]. 50 (1): 449–460. doi:10.2298/ZRVI1350449I.
- Komatina, Predrag (2011). "Vizantijska titula Konstantina Bodina" [The byzantine title of Constantine Bodin]. Зборник радова Византолошког института (48). Византолошки институт: 61–76. doi:10.2298/zrvi1148061k. ISSN 0584-9888.
- Komatina, Predrag (2012). "Србија и Дукља у делу Јована Скилице" [Serbia and Dioclea in the work of John Scylitzes]. Зборник радова Византолошког института (49). National Library of Serbia: 159–186. doi:10.2298/zrvi1249159k. ISSN 0584-9888.
- Komatina, Ivana (2015). "Srpski vladari u Aleksijadi - hronološki okviri delovanja" [Serbian rulers in the Alexiad - some chronological notes] (PDF). Зборник радова Византолошког института. LII.
- Komatina, Predrag (2016). "Military, administrative and religious strongholds on the Danubian frontier". Byzantine Heritage and Serbian Art. I: 103–108 – via Academia.edu.
- Komatina, Ivana; Komatina, Predrag (2018). "Византијски и угарски Срем од X до XIII века" [The Byzantine and Hungarian Syrmia in the 10th–13th centuries]. Зборник радова Византолошког института (55). National Library of Serbia: 141–164. doi:10.2298/zrvi1855141k. ISSN 0584-9888.
- Maksimović, Ljubomir (1997). "Organizacija vizantijske vlasti u novo osvojenim oblastima posle 1018. godine". Зборник радова Византолошког института. 36.
- Stephenson, Paul (2003). The Legend of Basil the Bulgar-Slayer. Cambridge University Press. ISBN 978-0-521-81530-7.
