= Battle of Thessalonica (1014) =

Coordinates: 40°39′N 22°54′E

- Part of the Byzantine–Bulgarian wars
Date	July, 1014
Location	Thessaloniki, Greece
Result	Byzantine victory

Belligerents
Bulgarian Empire	Byzantine Empire

Commanders and leaders
Nestoritsa	Theophylactus Botaniates

Strength
Unknown	Unknown

Casualties and losses
Heavy	Unknown

The battle of Thessalonica (Bulgarian: Битка при Солун) was fought between the Bulgarian and the Byzantine Empires in the summer of 1014 near the city of Thessalonica in contemporary northern Greece. The Bulgarian army under the command of Nestoritsa was defeated by the Byzantines led by the governor of Thessalonica Theophylactus Botaniates and it was unable to divert the main Byzantine forces who were attacking the Bulgarian ramparts between the Belasitsa and Ograzhden mountains.

== Prelude ==
In the summer of 1014 the Byzantine Emperor Basil II launched his annual campaign against Bulgaria. From Western Thrace via Serres he reached the valley of the Strumeshnitsa river where his troops were halted by a thick palisade guarded by an army under the personal command of Samuil. To divert the attention of the enemy the Bulgarian Emperor sent a large force under his general Nestoritsa to the south to attack the second largest city of the Byzantine Empire, Thessalonica.

== The battle ==
Several days later Nestoritsa reached the vicinity of Thessalonica. On the fields to the west of the city or according to other historians near the river of Galik it was confronted by a strong army led by the doux (governor) of Thessalonica, Theophylactus Botaniates and his son Michael. The son of the governor charged the Bulgarians but was surrounded. In the fierce battle there the Bulgarians had many casualties and pulled back under the cover of archers. A second attack by Michael and the Byzantine cavalry resulted in a complete defeat for Nestoritsa's troops and they fled. The victorious Byzantines captured many soldiers. After he had secured Thessalonica, Botaniates joined Basil's army at Belasitsa.

Later in that summer, Botaniates and his army were defeated in the gorges to the south of Strumitsa and he perished in the battle, killed by Samuil's son Gavril Radomir. Nestoritsa, who survived the defeat, surrendered to Basil II four years later in 1018, after the Byzantine Emperor entered the capital of Bulgaria Ohrid.

== Sources ==
- Златарски, Васил, История на българската държава през средните векове, том 1, част 2, Академично издателство "Марин Дринов", София 1994, ISBN 954-430-299-9
- Ангелов, Димитър, и Борис Чолпанов, Българска военна история през средновековието (Х-XV век), Издателство на Българската академия на науките, София 1994, ISBN 954-430-200-X
- Николов, Георги, Централизъм и регионализъм в ранносредновековна България (края на VII - началото на ХІ в.), Академично издателство "Марин Дринов", София 2005, ISBN 954-430-787-7
- Пириватрич, Сърджан, Самуиловата държава. Обхват и характер, Изд. група "АГАТА-А", София 2000, ISBN 954-540-020-X
- Подбрани извори за българската история, Том II: Българските държави и българите през Средновековието, Изд. "ТАНГРА ТанНакРа ИК", София 2004, ISBN 954-9942-40-6
