= Bulgarians in Hungary =

Bulgarians (Hungarian: bolgárok) are one of the thirteen officially recognized ethnic minorities in Hungary (Bulgarian: Унгария, Ungaria; old name Маджарско, Madzharsko) since the Rights of National and Ethnic Minorities Act was enacted by the National Assembly of Hungary on 7 July 1993. They number 2,316 and amount to 0.02% of the country's total population according to the 2001 census, but are estimated between 2,000 and 7,000 according to different authors.

== History ==
In the Early Middle Ages, much of modern Hungary was often under the rule of the First Bulgarian Empire. The popular Bulgarian ruler Krum may have been born in Pannonia, and Bulgarian dukes like Salan, Glad, Ahtum, Sermon and Menumorut are mentioned as the lords of Syrmia, Banat, Bačka and parts of Transylvania proper in the 9th-11th centuries according to the Gesta Hungarorum.

The northern Hungarian town of Szentendre and the surrounding villages were inhabited by Bulgarians since the Middle Ages. In the 18th century, Szentendre had a Bulgarian neighbourhood of settlers from Chiprovtsi and a "Chiprovtsi church", indicating refugees from the time of the Chiprovtsi Uprising. A village near Visegrád was called Bolgár falu ("Bulgarian village") in the 16th century; Bulgarian refugees fleeing the Ottoman rule are first mentioned as inhabitants of this area on 30 December 1428. Gradually, however, these Bulgarians were assimilated into the Magyar population.

A number of Roman Catholic Banat Bulgarians settled in what is today Hungary as a secondary migration, establishing an early and small Banat Bulgarian community in Hungary. In Bulgarian interwar publications, their number is rounded and possibly overestimated at 10,000.

However, the Bulgarian ethnic community is largely descended from gardeners and other professionals who migrated to Austria-Hungary in large groups in the 18th, 19th and 20th centuries, prior to World War I. In 1857, Bulgarians in Pest-Pilis-Solt-Kiskun (not counting Pest, Buda and Kecskemét) numbered 2,815, and their population had not changed significantly in 1870.

The oldest Bulgarian organization in Hungary, the Association of Bulgarians in Hungary, was founded in 1914 on the initiative of Lazar Ivanov from Teteven. The Bulgarian Church Community was founded in 1916 and the first Bulgarian school in 1918. Since then, the Bulgarian community has diversified to a great extent.

The Bulgarian Orthodox church of Ss. Cyril and Methodius in Ferencváros, Budapest was constructed in 1932. A Bulgarian newspaper, Balgarski vesti, and a Bulgarian magazine, Hemus, are published by the Bulgarian community, as well as various books. There exist a number of folk dance groups, a theatre, several orchestras, a Bulgarian school for the native language and a Bulgarian-Hungarian secondary school for languages named after Hristo Botev.

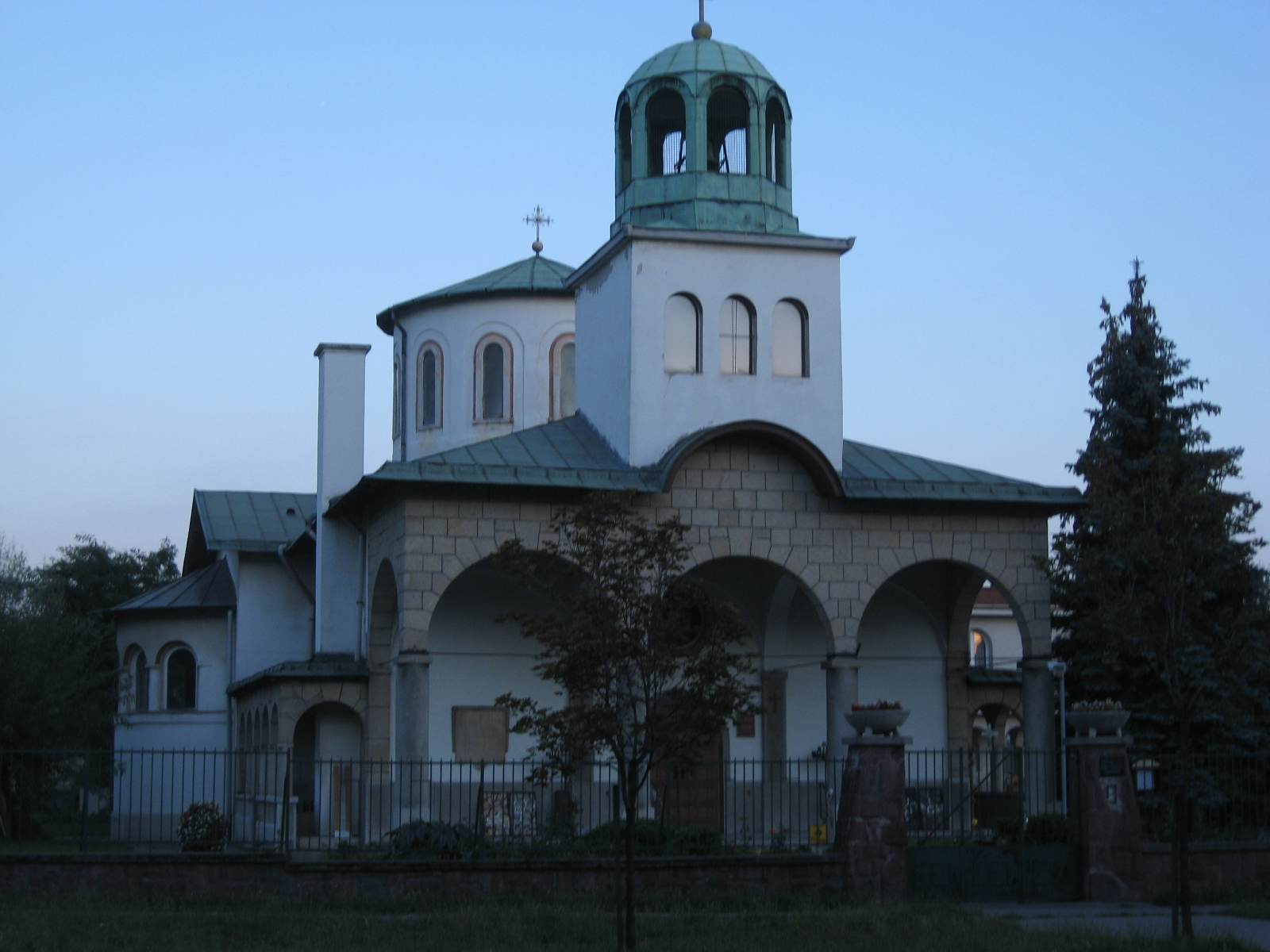
The Bulgarian Orthodox Church of Saints Cyril and Methodius in Ferencváros, Budapest (Hungarian: Szent Cirill és Szent Metód Bolgár Pravoszláv templom)

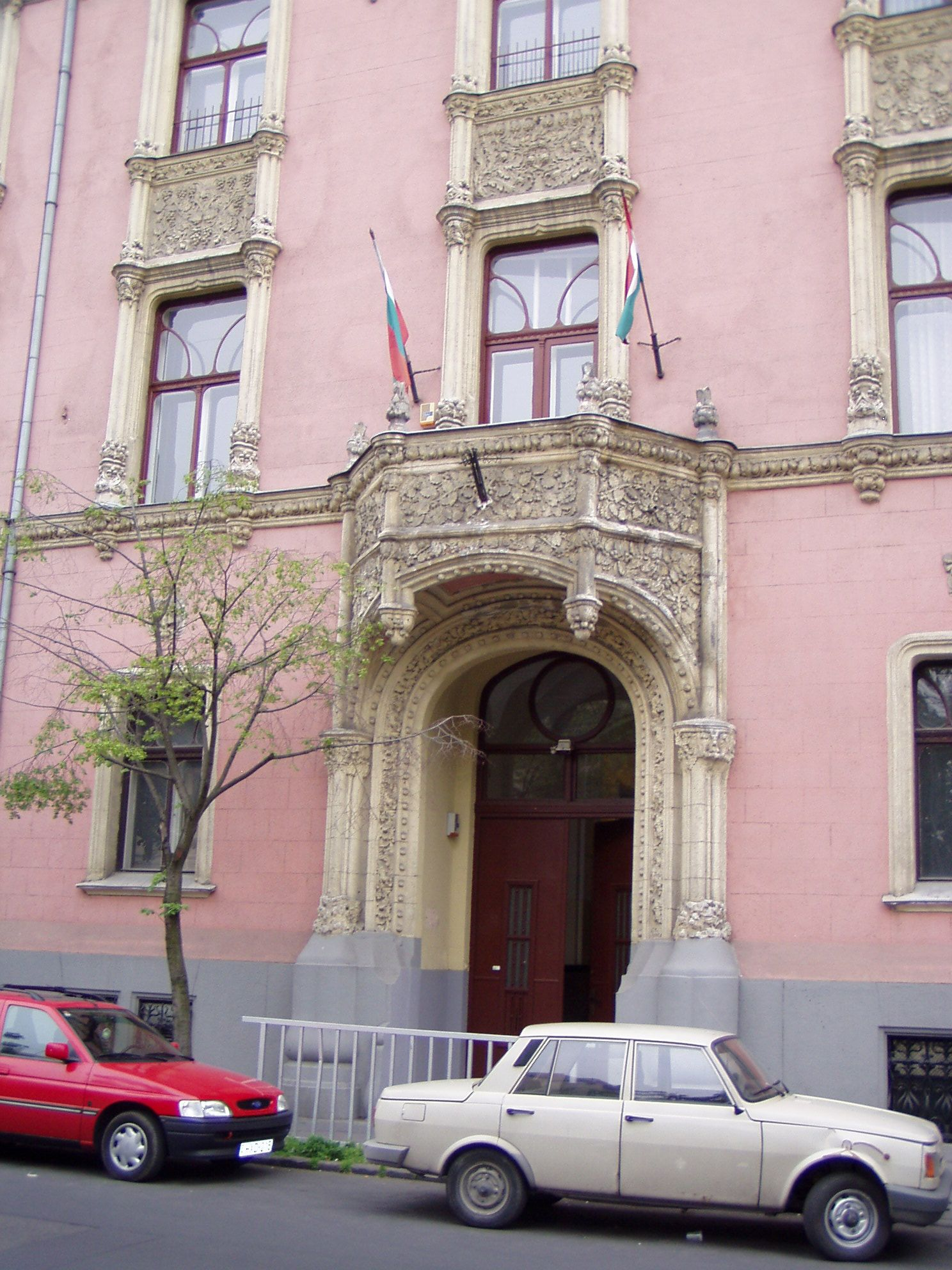
The Hristo Botev Bulgarian–Hungarian secondary school in Budapest

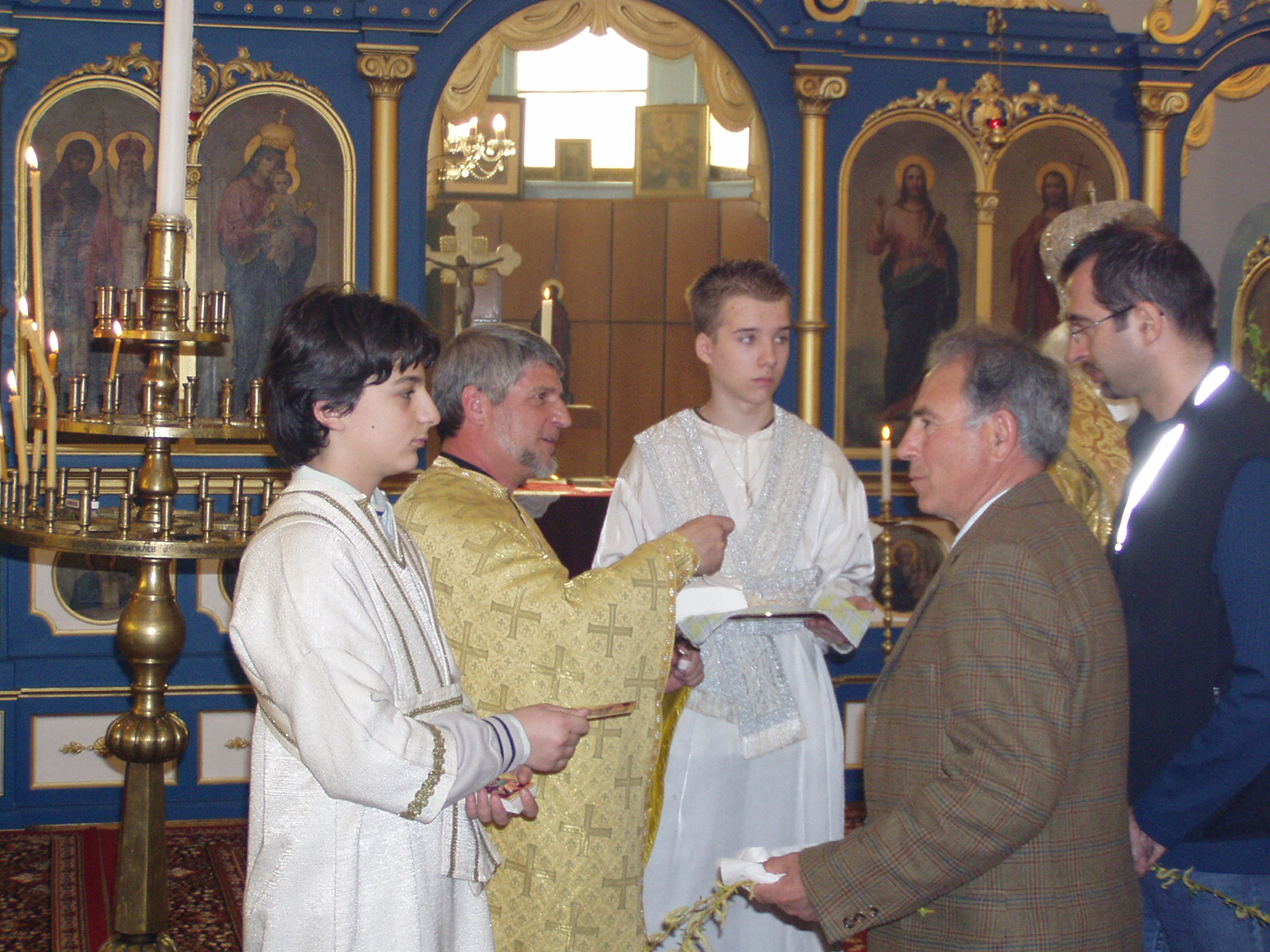
The Bulgarian Orthodox Church of Saints Cyril and Methodius

== Number and share ==
=== Censuses ===
Number of Bulgarians according to the census over the years by counties:

	2001	2011
Hungary	2 316	6 272
Baranya	86	204
Borsod-Abaúj-Zemplén	93	335
Budapest	1 207	2 271
Bács-Kiskun	49	231
Békés	46	103
Csongrád	73	171
Fejér	39	157
Győr-Moson-Sopron	25	256
Hajdú-Bihar	83	341
Heves	17	108
Jász-Nagykun-Szolnok	35	172
Komárom-Esztergom	58	162
Nógrád	21	55
Pest	322	1 052
Somogy	38	99
Szabolcs-Szatmár-Bereg	43	171
Tolna	22	73
Vas	11	96
Veszprém	25	138
Zala	23	77

== People ==
- Klára Dobrev, politician
- Balázs Nikolov, footballer

== See also ==
- Bulgaria–Hungary relations
- Bulgarian diaspora
- Immigration to Hungary
- Hungarians in Bulgaria
