= Nestoritsa =

Nestoritsa (Bulgarian: Несторица) was a Bulgarian noble and general during the reign of Emperors Samuil (997-1014); Gavril Radomir (1014–1015) and Ivan Vladislav (1015–1018). He was one of Bulgaria's most skillful military commanders.

In 1014 when the Byzantine Emperor Basil II was stopped by the wooden palisade around the village of Klyutch, Samuil decided to draw Basil's attention from there and sent Nestoritsa with a large army to strike in southern direction. Nestoritsa marched through the Vardar valley to the second-biggest Byzantine city, Thessaloniki. In the vicinity of the city the Bulgarians were engaged by enemy forces under the governor of Thessaloniki Theophylactus Botaniates and his son Michail. The battle was bloody with heavy casualties for both sides but in the end the Byzantines emerged victorious and captured many soldiers and weapons. Soon after that followed the major defeat in the battle of Kleidion.

Despite the defeat the Bulgarian resistance continued for four more years until the death of Emperor Ivan Vladislav finally broke the spirit for struggle and many noble decided to surrender keeping their title. Nestoritsa was among them surrendered with his troops to Basil II in the late 1018 along with Lasaritsa and Dobromir.

== Sources ==
- John Skylitzes. Synopsis Historion, translated by Paul Stephenson.
- Nikolov, Georgi (2005). Centralism and regionalism in early Medieval Bulgaria (end of the 7th – beginning of the 11th centuries) (Tsentralizam i regionalizam v rannosrednowekovna Balgariya (kraya na VII — nachaloto na XI vek), Централизъм и регионализъм в ранносредновековна България (края на VII — началото на XI век) (in Bulgarian). Sofia: Academic Press Marin Drinov. ISBN 954-430-787-7.
