= Battle of Dyrrhachium =

Battle of Dyrrhachium may refer to:

- Battle of Dyrrhachium (48 BC), a battle during Caesar's civil war
- Battle of Dyrrhachium (1018), a battle between the Bulgarians and the Byzantine Empire
- Battle of Dyrrhachium (1081), a battle between the Normans and the Byzantine Empire
- Siege of Dyrrhachium (1107–1108), a battle between the Normans and the Byzantine Empire
