= Battle of Bitola (1015) =

1015 battle of the Byzantine-Bulgarian Wars

Coordinates: 41°01′55″N 21°20′05″E

- Part of the Byzantine–Bulgarian wars
Date	Autumn, 1015
Location	near Bitola, North Macedonia
Result	Bulgarian victory

Belligerents
Bulgarian Empire	Byzantine Empire

Commanders and leaders
Ivats	George Gonitsiates; Orestes

Strength
Unknown	Unknown

Casualties and losses
Unknown	Heavy

The battle of Bitola (Bulgarian: Битка при Битоля) took place near the town of Bitola, in Bulgarian territory, between a Bulgarian army under the command of the voivode Ivats and a Byzantine army led by the strategos George Gonitsiates. It was one of the last open battles between the First Bulgarian Empire and the Byzantine Empire. The Bulgarians were victorious and the Byzantine Emperor Basil II had to retreat from the Bulgarian capital Ohrid, whose outer walls were by that time already breached by the Bulgarians. However, the Bulgarian victory only postponed the fall of Bulgaria to Byzantine rule in 1018.

== Prelude ==
In the battle of Kleidion on 29 July 1014 the bulk of the Bulgarian army was destroyed. The death of Tsar Samuil soon after that (6 October) further weakened the state. In the autumn of 1014 Basil II penetrated deep into Bulgarian territory and burned the palaces of Samuil's successor Gavril Radomir in the vicinity of Bitola. The hostilities were renewed in the spring of 1015. The Byzantine Emperor headed towards the heart of Bulgaria (around Lake Ohrid and Lake Prespa) and systematically seized every town or fortress on his way. The immediate reason for that campaign was the secession of Voden and its reincorporation to Bulgaria in the beginning of 1015. Basil II swiftly seized the town in the spring and resettled its inhabitants. In the summer the Byzantines conquered another important town, Moglena. During its siege they captured kavkhan Dometian and many soldiers.

Gavril Radomir's attempts to settle peace failed. Basil II continued the war and simultaneously encouraged a successful conspiracy of Ivan Vladislav to murder his cousin Radomir and take the throne. After Ivan Vladislav took the crown in August 1015, he pretended to agree to surrender to the Byzantines. Basil II did not trust him and prepared another plot to murder the new Bulgarian Tsar. The new conspiracy failed and led the negotiations to an end.

== Campaign to Ohrid and the battle ==
As he did not trust the proposal of Ivan Vladislav, Basil II immediately launched a new campaign via Ostrovo. The Byzantines blinded every captured Bulgarian. In Pelagonia he left a large army under the command of the strategoi George Gonitsiates and Orestes to pillage the region and guard the Byzantine rear between Ohrid and Bitola. Basil himself reached Ohrid and managed to overrun most of the city except for the citadel where the royal palaces were located.

However his initial intention to march west to Dyrrhachium failed after unexpected difficulties in the Byzantine rear. The army which was led by Gonitsiates was ambushed by the Bulgarian commander Ivats and was completely destroyed. That defeat forced Basil II to pull back swiftly. The rest of the Byzantine army entered Pelagonia, but Ivats avoided engaging it, and Basil II retreated undisturbed to Thessaloniki.

== Aftermath ==
The battle of Bitola deprived Basil II of the great success achieved at the beginning of a campaign which might have destroyed the Bulgarian state as early as 1015. However the devastation which the country suffered that year was a prerequisite for the final fall of the First Bulgarian Empire in 1018.
