= Michael Dermokaites =

Michael Dermokaites (Greek: Μιχαήλ Δερμοκαΐτης) was an 11th-century Byzantine hypostrategos of Debar. He is descended from the Byzantine noble Dermokaites family.

== Sources ==
- Byzantium's Balkan frontier: a political study of the Northern Balkans, 900–1204, p. 130
