= Theophilos Erotikos (10th century) =

Byzantine scholar and official

Theophilos Erotikos (Greek: Θεόφιλος Ἐρωτικός, romanized: Theóphilos Erotikós, fl. 940s) was a 10th-century Byzantine jurist and official.

== Life ==
His origin and family are unknown, except that he was a relative by marriage of a certain patrikios Nikephoros, who was appointed by Constantine VII (r. 945–959) as teacher of geometry at the University of Constantinople. He is first mentioned in 945 as the Eparch of Constantinople, having evidently occupied the office already under Romanos I Lekapenos (r. 920–944).

In the aftermath of an earthquake in 945/6 he was charged with caring for the citizens whose homes were destroyed, but his officials, especially a certain Zonaras, wasted the allocated funds. Nevertheless, soon after (before March 947), he was promoted successively to the senior legal office of quaestor and the rank of patrikios. He was generally recognized as an excellent jurist and administrator. As quaestor, he was possibly the successor of the magistros Kosmas.

The date of his death is unknown, however he is mentioned as being dead in a law of 961. He was succeeded in his office as quaestor by Theodore Dekapolites. He was a paternal ancestor of Theophilos Erotikos and may have been a maternal ancestor of Manuel Erotikos Komnenos, founder of the Komnenian dynasty.

== Sources ==
- Guilland, Rodolphe (1967). Recherches sur les institutions byzantines [Studies on the Byzantine Institutions]. Berliner byzantinische Arbeiten 35 (in French). Vol. II. Berlin and Amsterdam: Akademie-Verlag & Adolf M. Hakkert. OCLC 878894516.
- Lilie, Ralph-Johannes; Ludwig, Claudia; Pratsch, Thomas; Zielke, Beate (2013). Prosopographie der mittelbyzantinischen Zeit Online. Berlin-Brandenburgische Akademie der Wissenschaften. Nach Vorarbeiten F. Winkelmanns erstellt (in German). Berlin and Boston: De Gruyter.
