= Theodore of Dekapolis =

10th-century Byzantine jurist

Theodore of Dekapolis or Theodore Dekapolites (Greek: Θεόδωρος ὁ Δεκαπολίτης, romanized: Theodōros Dekapolitēs, fl. 947–ca. 960) was a 10th-century Byzantine jurist and official. He is best known from the pieces of agrarian legislation that he composed.

== Life ==
His origin and family are unknown, but his surname indicates an origin in the Isaurian Decapolis.

He is first mentioned as a patrikios and quaestor in a Novel Law on the estates of stratiotai, which he composed and which is usually dated to 947 or slightly later. The Novel, following the principles on agrarian legislation established by Romanos I (r. 920–944), demanded the return to the peasants of any land allotted by the state which they had been forced to sell to the magnates (the dynatoi), with the provision that the price of the land should be repaid in full except by the poorest peasants. If improvements had been made in the meantime, then these too should be recompensed in the case of the smaller local magnates and small monasteries. Since Theophilos Erotikos is known to have held the post of quaestor in March 947, Theodore's appointment to the post must have been between that date and ca. 949. He remained in this post both under Constantine VII (r. 944–959) as well as under his successor Romanos II (r. 959–963), being mentioned again in a Novel issued in 960 or 961. At this time, he had risen to the rank of magistros. In the 960/1 Novel, "Theodore regulated the procedure for the restitution of peasants' and soldiers' properties illegally acquired by the dynatoi" (A. Kazhdan).

The time of his death is unknown, but he seems to have continued his legal career long into the reign of Basil II (r. 976–1025). According to the Peira of Eustathios Rhomaios, he was a member of the tribunal of the Covered Hippodrome that, in presence of the Emperor, adjudicated on an issue of document forgery. Eustathios, then still young and at the beginning of his career, proposed a different verdict than Dekapolites and the other senior judges, justifying his opinion so well that his view was eventually accepted. Based on the career of Eustathios Rhomaios, this incident is likely placed in the 990s. After Dekapolites' death, the poet John Geometres wrote an epigram in his honour, in which the personified Justice and Laws mourn his passing.

== Sources ==
- Kazhdan, Alexander (1991). "Theodore of Dekapolis". In Kazhdan, Alexander (ed.). The Oxford Dictionary of Byzantium. Oxford and New York: Oxford University Press. p. 2043. ISBN 0-19-504652-8.
- Lilie, Ralph-Johannes; Ludwig, Claudia; Pratsch, Thomas; Zielke, Beate (2013). Prosopographie der mittelbyzantinischen Zeit Online. Berlin-Brandenburgische Akademie der Wissenschaften. Nach Vorarbeiten F. Winkelmanns erstellt (in German). Berlin and Boston: De Gruyter.
