= Constantine Diogenes =

Byzantine general

- Κωνσταντῖνος Διογένης
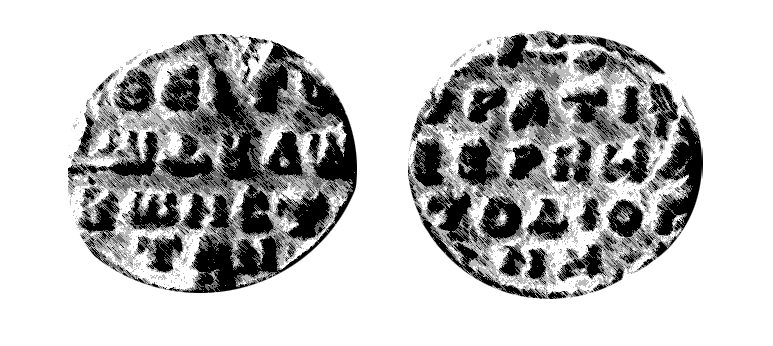
- Constantine Diogenes, "patrikios and strategos of Serbia"
- Died: 1032
- Relatives: Romanos IV Diogenes (son)
- Military career
- Allegiance: Byzantine Empire
- Commands: strategos and doux of various themes
- Wars: Byzantine conquest of Bulgaria, campaigns against Sermon and the Pechenegs

Constantine Diogenes (Greek: Κωνσταντῖνος Διογένης; died 1032) was a Byzantine general of the early 11th century, active in the Balkans. He served with distinction in the final stages of the Byzantine conquest of Bulgaria under Emperor Basil II, and occupied high commands in the Balkans until his arrest in 1029, as the result of his participation in a conspiracy against Emperor Romanos III Argyros. Imprisoned and forced to enter a monastery, he killed himself in 1032 during an inquest on a further conspiracy. He was the father of Emperor Romanos IV Diogenes.

== Biography ==
Constantine Diogenes is the first notable member of the noble Diogenes family with origins from Cappadocia, which played an important role in 11th-century Byzantium. Diogenes began his career as a commander of one of the western tagmata during the reign of Basil II (r. 976–1025), in the latter's campaigns against Bulgaria. In 1014, he participated in the decisive Byzantine victory at the Battle of Kleidion (July 29), and he subsequently succeeded Theophylact Botaneiates as commander (doux) of Thessalonica with the rank of patrikios, making him the second-most senior general of the Empire in the Balkans after David Arianites. Following the death of Tsar Samuel of Bulgaria in October, Diogenes and Nikephoros Xiphias were dispatched to the region of Moglena as the vanguard of the emperor and the main army. During this campaign, Diogenes constructed the fortress of Mylobos, as attested in a founder's inscription.

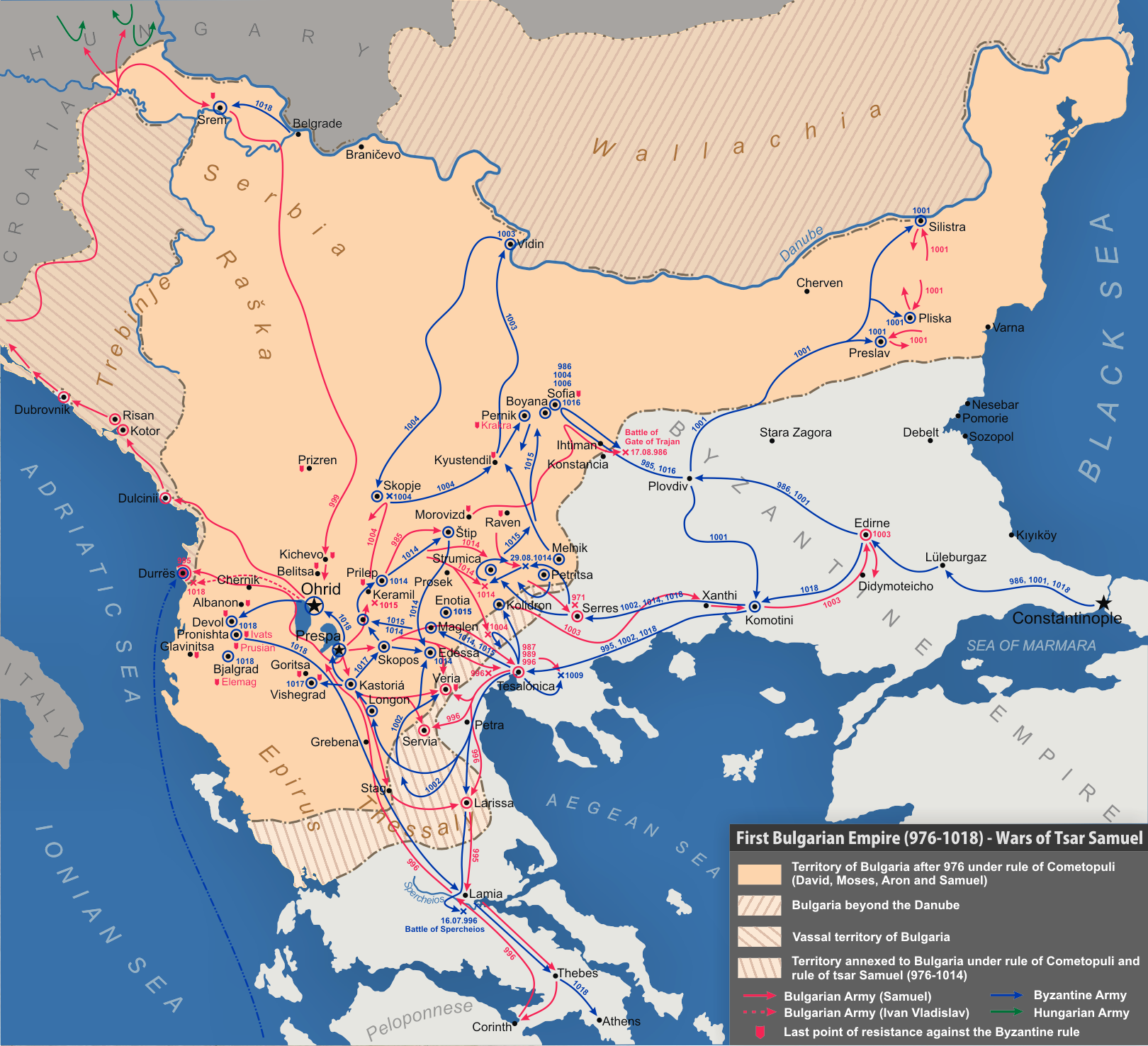
Map of the Byzantine–Bulgarian wars in the time of Emperor Basil II and Tsar Samuel of Bulgaria

The conquest of Moglena was completed in 1015 or 1016. In 1017, Diogenes and David Arianites led troops to plunder the fertile plain of Pelagonia, where they captured many prisoners and livestock. Soon after, Basil II placed Diogenes in charge of the tagmata of the Scholai of the West and of Thessalonica, and tasked him with pursuing Tsar Ivan Vladislav. The Bulgarian ruler set up an ambush for his pursuers, but Basil was informed in time, and led the rest of his troops to Diogenes' aid, scattering the Bulgarians.

After Ivan Vladislav's death in February 1018, Diogenes was charged with mopping up the last remaining centres of Bulgarian resistance. He took Sirmium and was named its commander (archon); his authority extended over the vassal polities in the inner regions of Serbia. His title was possibly that of "strategos of Serbia" (Greek: στρατηγός Σερβίας), which is attested in a seal attributed to him. Diogenes was ordered by Basil II to subdue Sermon, the ruler of Sirmium, to consolidate Byzantine control of the northern Balkans. Consequently, Diogenes invited Sermon to a meeting at the estuary of the river Sava in the Danube, where each would only be accompanied by three attendants. Diogenes had hidden his sword in the folds of his clothes, and struck Sermon down. He then marched his army into Sirmium, taking possession of the town. Sermon's wife was sent as a captive to Constantinople.

Around 1022 or 1025, Diogenes succeeded Arianites as overall Byzantine commander (strategos autokrator) of conquered Bulgaria. In this capacity, he repelled a large Pecheneg invasion in 1027. The same year, he was withdrawn south to Thessalonica but retained, at least nominally, his role as overall commander, as attested by another seal naming him "anthypatos, patrikios and doux of Thessalonica, Bulgaria and Serbia".

Diogenes had been married to an anonymous daughter of Basil Argyros, brother of Emperor Romanos III Argyros (r. 1028–1034), but in 1029 he was accused, along with other prominent Balkan generals such as Eustathios Daphnomeles, of conspiring against the emperor with the porphyrogennete princess Theodora. He was transferred east as strategos of the Thracesian Theme but, as soon as his complicity in the affair was confirmed, was recalled to Constantinople. There he was imprisoned, beaten and publicly paraded in the Mese along with the other conspirators, and later tonsured and forced to enter the Stoudios Monastery. Theodora herself was placed in a convent, but she apparently continued to conspire with Diogenes, who planned to take advantage of Romanos's absence on campaign in the East in 1032 to escape to the Balkans. The plot was leaked to Romanos by Theophanes, metropolitan of Thessalonica, and the conspirators were arrested. Diogenes was brought to the Palace of Blachernae for interrogation by John the Orphanotrophos, but he died by suicide, throwing himself off a wall, rather than confess under torture and implicate his fellow conspirators.

Constantine's son Romanos Diogenes became a successful general and eventually rose to become emperor in 1068–71.

== Sources ==
- Garland, Lynda (1999). Byzantine Empresses: Women and Power in Byzantium, AD 527–1204. New York and London: Routledge. ISBN 978-0-415-14688-3.
- Guilland, Rodolphe (1967). Recherches sur les Institutions Byzantines, Tome I (in French). Berlin: Akademie-Verlag.
- Holmes, Catherine (2005). Basil II and the Governance of Empire (976–1025). Oxford: Oxford University Press. ISBN 978-0-19-927968-5.
- Kazhdan, Alexander, ed. (1991). The Oxford Dictionary of Byzantium. Oxford and New York: Oxford University Press. ISBN 0-19-504652-8.
- Lilie, Ralph-Johannes; Ludwig, Claudia; Pratsch, Thomas; Zielke, Beate (2013). Prosopographie der mittelbyzantinischen Zeit Online. Berlin-Brandenburgische Akademie der Wissenschaften. Nach Vorarbeiten F. Winkelmanns erstellt (in German). Berlin and Boston: De Gruyter.
- Stephenson, Paul (2000). Byzantium's Balkan Frontier: A Political Study of the Northern Balkans, 900-1204. Cambridge: Cambridge University Press. ISBN 0-521-77017-3.
- Stephenson, Paul (2003). The Legend of Basil the Bulgar-Slayer. Cambridge: Cambridge University Press. ISBN 978-0-521-81530-7.

Preceded by Theophylact Botaneiates	doux of Thessalonica; 1014–1018 (?)	Unknown Next known title holder: Nikephoros Kabasilas
New title	archon of Sirmium; 1018–1022/25	Unknown
New title	strategos of Serbia; 1018–?	Elevated to doux
Preceded by David Arianites	strategos autokrator of Bulgaria; 1022/25–1027	Unknown
New title Elevated from strategos	doux of Thessalonica, Bulgaria and Serbia; 1027–1029	Unknown
Unknown	strategos of the Thracesian Theme; 1029	Unknown
