= Dermokaites =

Byzantine noble family

Dermokaites Δερμοκαΐτης
- Noble family
- Country: Byzantine Empire
- Founded: 10th century
- Titles: doux; protospatharios; strategos and more

Dermokaites (Greek: Δερμοκαΐτης) was a Byzantine noble family active from the 10th to the 15th century.

== Members ==
- Basil Dermokaites
- John Dermokaites, protospatharios épi tou Chrysotriklinou.
- John Dermokaites, strategos in the West (1036).
- Michael Dermokaites, hypostrategos of Debar (11th century).
- Michael Dermokaites, doux of Dyrrachion (1040).
- Nikephoros Dermokaites.
- Nicholas Dermokaites, protospatharios and strategos of Serbia (mid-11th century)
- Eustathios Dermokaites, protospatharios and tagmatophylax (mid-11th century).
- Romanos Dermokaites.
- Theophylaktos Dermokaites (fl. 1367), parakoimomenos, katholikos kritēs sent as en emissary to Pope Urban V in October 1367.

== Sources ==
- Trapp, Erich; Beyer, Hans-Veit; Walther, Rainer; Sturm-Schnabl, Katja; Kislinger, Ewald; Leontiadis, Ioannis; Kaplaneres, Sokrates (1976–1996). Prosopographisches Lexikon der Palaiologenzeit (in German). Vienna: Verlag der Österreichischen Akademie der Wissenschaften. ISBN 3-7001-3003-1.
- Guilland, Rodolphe (1967). "Le Parakimomène". Recherches sur les institutions byzantines [Studies on the Byzantine Institutions]. Berliner byzantinische Arbeiten 35 (in French). Vol. I. Berlin and Amsterdam: Akademie-Verlag & Adolf M. Hakkert. pp. 202–215. OCLC 878894516.
- D. Nicol, The Byzantine family of Dermokaites circa 940–1453, Byzantinoslavica 35, 1974/1, p. 1-11.
- Алексеенко, Николай. "Alekseyenko NА The Dermokaites Family in Byzantine History and Two New Seals Showing the Name of Michael Dermokaites (Семейство Дермокаитов в истории Византии и две новые печати с именем Михаила Дермокаита). In: ΧΕΡΣΩΝΟΣ ΘΕΜΑΤΑ. Vol. 2. Worlds of Byzantium. Simferopol, 2019.(in Russian)." ΧΕΡΣΩΝΟΣ ΘΕΜΑΤΑ. Vol. 2. Worlds of Byzantium (2019).
- АЛЕКСЕЕНКО, Николай Александрович. "Печать севаста Михаила Дермокаита (небольшой штрих к византийской просопографии)." ΧΕΡΣΩΝΟΣ ΘΕΜΑΤΑ: ИМПЕРИЯ И ПОЛИС. 2018.
- KAŽDAN, A. "The Byzantine Family of Dermokaites. Additions to the article by DM Nicol in ByzSlav XXXV (1974)." Byzantinoslavica. Prague 36 (1975): 192.
