= Cyprus (theme) =

Byzantine administrative unit (theme)

Theme of Cyprus θέμα Κύπρου théma Kýprou
- c. 873–c. 880/ 965–1191
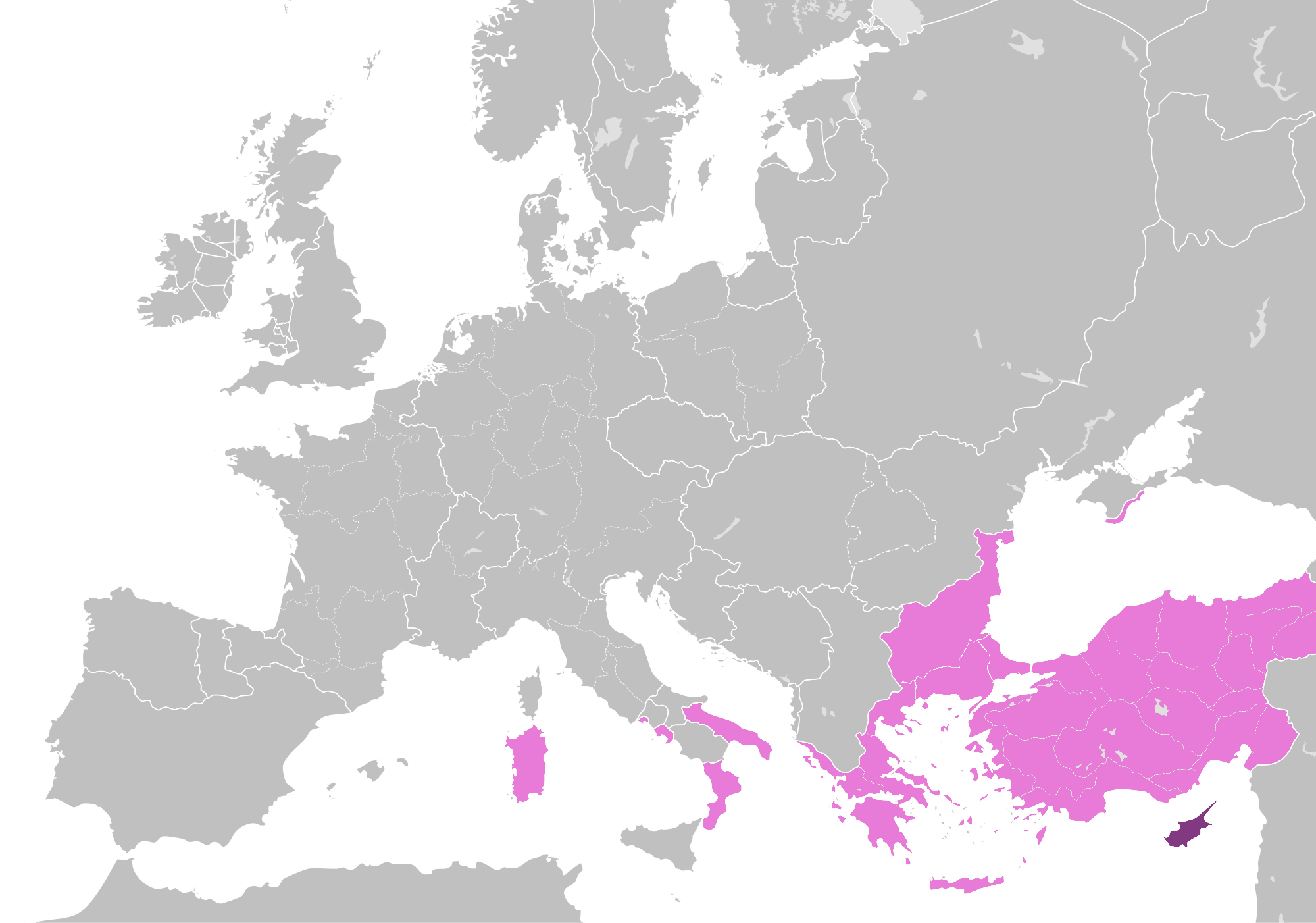
- Cyprus shaded within the Byzantine Empire, AD 1000
- Status: Theme of the Byzantine Empire (965–1185); Rump state (1185–1191)
- Capital: Nicosia
- Historical era: Middle Ages
  - Establishment as a theme: c. 873
  - Reconquest of Cyprus: 965
  - Isaac Komnenos of Cyprus proclaims independence: 1185

Area
  - Total: 9,251 km^{2} (3,572 sq mi)
Preceded by	Succeeded by
Roman Cyprus	Kingdom of Cyprus
- Today part of: Cyprus; Akrotiri and Dhekelia

Cyprus (Ancient Greek: Κύπρος, Kýpros) or the Theme of Cyprus (Ancient Greek: θέμα Κύπρου, théma Kýprou) was a Byzantine province comprising the island of Cyprus, established in 965 after the reconquest of Cyprus by the Byzantine navy. Prior to this the island had been a condominium between the Byzantine Empire and Arab caliphate for three centuries, except occasional short periods where it was occupied by either power. Important cities on the island at this time included Nicosia, Limassol, and Famagusta.

== History ==
Rebellions by the thematic governors, Theophilos Erotikos in 1042 and Rhapsomates in 1091, failed, being quickly subdued by imperial forces. The island was spared the destruction of the loss of Anatolia and remained peaceful and relatively prosperous during turn of the 12th century. During the Siege of Antioch, a battle of the First Crusade, the Crusader army received supplies from Byzantine-controlled Cyprus.

In the spring of 1156, the island was attacked by Raynald of Châtillon and Thoros II. The island was the governed by John Doukas Komnenos, who remained with part of the local garrison at Nicosia, while the general Michael Branas led a force to confront the invaders. Branas was driven back towards Nicosia, and John led a sally to rescue him. The Byzantines were again defeated, with both John and Branas taken prisoner. The victorious Franks and Crusaders then conducted widespread plundering of the island, not sparing churches or convents. In the words of the historian Steven Runciman, "The crops were burnt; the herds were rounded up, together with all the population, and driven down to the coast. The women were raped; children and folk too old to move had their throats cut". The plundering went on for three weeks, before Raynald and Thoros boarded their ships with their loot and prisoners, and departed. The destruction was compounded by the effects of the 1157 Hama earthquake, and by a Fatimid naval raid in 1158.

Proclaiming himself "emperor", Isaac Komnenos established control over the island in 1185. Storms plaguing the Third Crusade wrecked two ships of Richard I of England's fleet off Cyprus in 1187. A third—carrying his sister Joan and betrothed Berengaria—reached the port of Limassol but Isaac's known hostility to all "Franks" meant it sat at anchor in the harbor, Joan fearing that coming ashore would mean capture and being held for ransom. Richard's ships arrived a week later on 8 May and, outraged at the women's conditions and treatment, he invaded the island. He laid siege to Nicosia, defeated Isaac at Tremetousia, and became ruler of the island and sold it to the Knights Templar in 1191 to pay off his debts and fund further action in the Crusade.

== Bibliography ==
- Gregory, Timothy E. (1991). "Cyprus". In Kazhdan, Alexander (ed.). The Oxford Dictionary of Byzantium. Oxford and New York: Oxford University Press. pp. 567–569. ISBN 0-19-504652-8.
- Runciman, Steven (1952). A History of the Crusades, Volume II: The Kingdom of Jerusalem and the Frankish East. Vol. 2. Cambridge: Cambridge University Press.
