= Irene of Larissa =

Irene

Empress consort of Bulgaria
- Born: Unknown; Larissa, Byzantine Empire
- Died: 1015; Bulgaria
- Spouse: Gavril Radomir of Bulgaria

Irene of Larissa (Bulgarian: Ирина от Лариса) was the second wife and empress-consort (tsaritsa) of tsar Gavril Radomir of Bulgaria.

John Skylitzes reports Irene was a "beautiful captive from Larissa", and nothing else is known about her antecedents. The captives from Larissa were made slaves by the Bulgarian monarch.

Gavril Radomir married her around 999 after he had expelled his first Hungarian wife, Margaret (daughter of Géza), who was pregnant at this time.

They had seven children, five sons and two daughters.

Gavril Radomir succeeded to the Bulgarian throne in 1014, but his reign was short. Skylitzes reports that Irene was murdered along with her husband by his cousin, Ivan Vladislav, who seized the throne in 1015. He also took steps to ensure his position and ordered the mutilation of their eldest son.

== Sources ==
- История на българската държава през средните векове, Том I. История на Първото българско царство. Част II. От славянизацията на държавата до падането на Първото царство (852—1018). Васил Н. Златарски 4.Приемниците на цар Самуил и покорението на България от Василий II Българоубиец.
- Runciman, Steven, The First Bulgarian Empire. 1930.
- John Skylitzes. Synopsis Historion, translated by Paul Stephenson.

Preceded by Agatha	Empress consort of Bulgaria; 1014–1015	Succeeded by Maria
