= Theophylact Botaneiates =

Theophylact Botaneiates (Greek: Θεοφύλακτος Βοτανειάτης, Theophylaktos Botaneiates) was an 11th-century Byzantine general and governor of Thessalonica of the Botaneiates family.

== Life ==
Theophylact Botaneiates is only mentioned in the history of John Skylitzes for the year 1014, during Emperor Basil II's wars against Bulgaria. In that year, or shortly before, he was appointed governor (doux) of Thessalonica as successor to David Arianites. In that year, Emperor Basil II was assaulting the Bulgarian positions in the pass of Klyuch (Kleidion in Greek). To distract his attention, the Bulgarian tsar Samuel sent a large army under Nestoritsa towards Thessalonica. Botaneiates and his son Michael met the Bulgarians and defeated them in the vicinity of the city, after which he joined the main imperial army.

After the Byzantine victory in the subsequent Battle of Kleidion, Botaneiates was sent with an army to clear the area around Strumitza. He carried out his mission with success, but on his way back to the Emperor's camp his army was ambushed by the Bulgarians and Botaneiates himself was killed, either by arrows and stones, according to Skylitzes' account, or run through by the spear of Samuel's son Gavril Radomir, as reported in a side note to the original manuscript of Skylitzes. Theophylact's son Michael is not attested thereafter, so he may have perished as well in the ambush.

According to Skylitzes, the death of Botaneiates alongside most of his men greatly disheartened Basil, so that the emperor, despite his victory at Kleidion, halted his campaign and turned back to his base, Mosynopolis. It was only after reaching Mosynopolis and learning of Samuel's death that he turned back and continued his campaign.

== Sources ==
- Holmes, Catherine (2005). Basil II and the Governance of Empire (976–1025). Oxford: Oxford University Press. ISBN 978-0-19-927968-5.
- Lilie, Ralph-Johannes; Ludwig, Claudia; Pratsch, Thomas; Zielke, Beate (2013). Prosopographie der mittelbyzantinischen Zeit Online. Berlin-Brandenburgische Akademie der Wissenschaften. Nach Vorarbeiten F. Winkelmanns erstellt (in German). Berlin and Boston: De Gruyter.
- Zlatarski, Vasil (1971) [1927]. История на българската държава през средните векове. Том I. История на Първото българско царство, Част II. От славянизацията на държавата до падането на Първото царство (852—1018) [History of Bulgaria in the Middle Ages. Vol. 1. History of the First Bulgarian Empire, Part 2.From the Slavicization of the state to the fall of the First Empire (852—1018)]. Sofia: Nauka i izkustvo. OCLC 67080314.

Preceded by David Arianites	doux of Thessalonica ca. 1014	Succeeded by Constantine Diogenes
