= Provatas (Byzantine family) =

The Provatas or Probatas was a Byzantine noble family mentioned in the 11th and 12th centuries. The toponym Provatas exists, and there was a garden named as such near Thessaloniki described by George Akropolites but it has not been identified.

== Members ==
- In 1034, a Probatas in Asia Minor was stripped of his possessions, surrounding the Antioch rebellion and Dalassenos.
- George Provatas or Probatas (fl. 1039–1040) was a Byzantine official and military commander. He was an eunuch. In May 1039, the Thrakesion troops defeated the "Saracens" and brought 500 prisoners alive to the emperor, while the rest were impaled. John sent George Probatas as his ambassador to the Sicilian emir to negotiate peace, and he succeeded, even bringing home the emir's son. Probatas was sent with a Byzantine punitive expedition to defeat the rebel Stefan Vojislav in Duklja and Serbia, who refused to return stolen gold, some time after 1039. He failed, with all of his military unit lost. George is mentioned by John Skylitzes and Chomatenos.
- Theophanes Provatas (fl. 1185), active during the Sack of Thessalonica (1185).

== Sources ==
- Komatina, Predrag (2012). "Србија и Дукља у делу Јована Скилице" [Serbia and Dioclea in the work of John Scylitzes]. Зборник радова Византолошког института (49). National Library of Serbia: 159–186. doi:10.2298/zrvi1249159k. ISSN 0584-9888.
- Skylitzes, John; Wortley, John (2010-10-07). John Skylitzes: A Synopsis of Byzantine History, 811–1057: Translation and Notes. Cambridge University Press. ISBN 978-1-139-48915-7.
- Macrides, Ruth (2007). George Akropolites: The History: Introduction, translation and commentary. OUP Oxford. ISBN 978-0-19-156871-8.
