= Sirmium (theme) =

11th century Byzantine administrative unit

Theme of Sirmium Σίρμιο, θέμα Σιρμίου
- Theme of Byzantine Empire
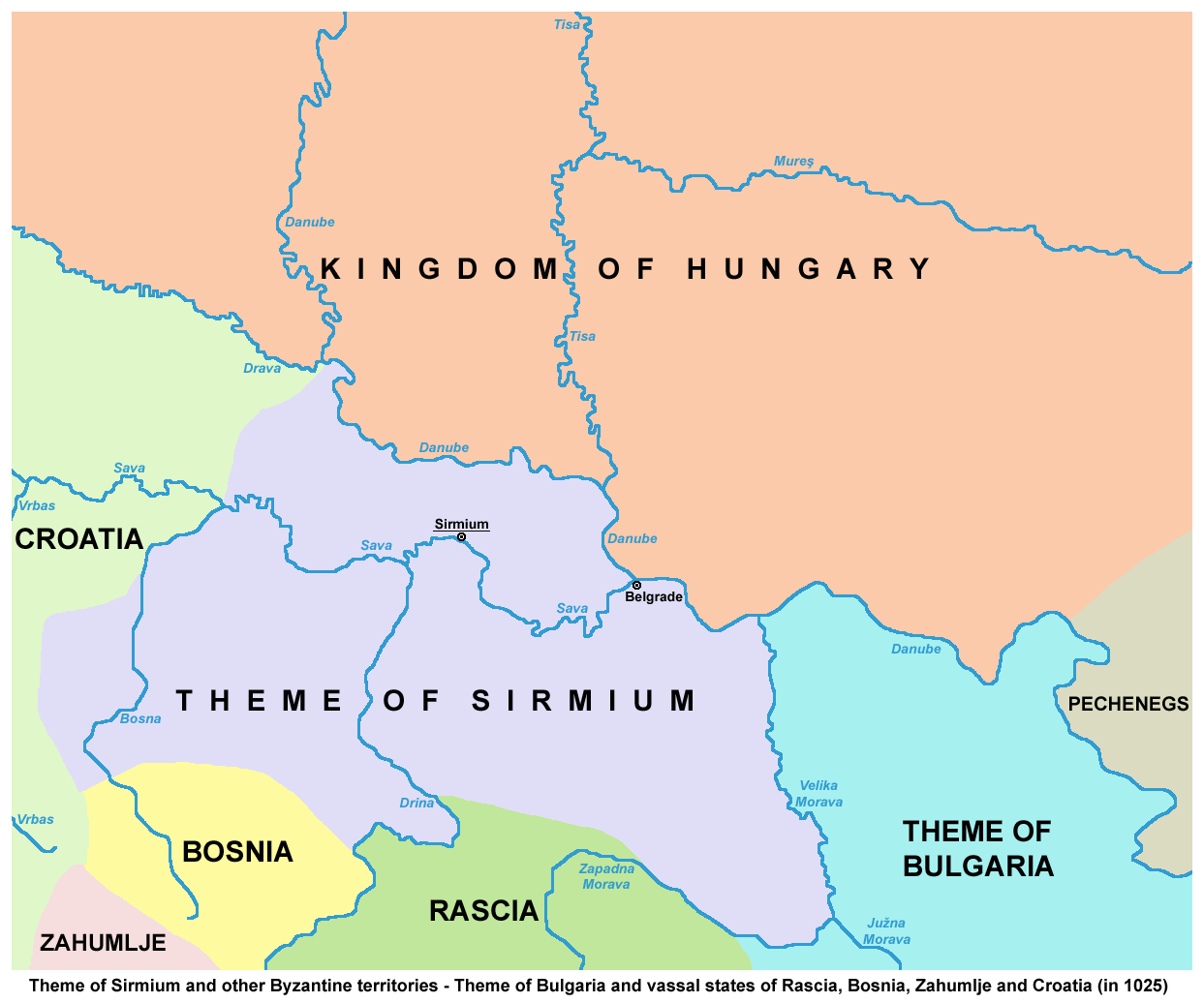
- Map of Theme Sirmium within Byzantine Empire in 1025.
- Capital: Sirmium
  - Type: Theme
- Historical era: Middle Ages
  - Annexation: 1018
Preceded by
Image missing	Duchy of Sermon
	Pannonia, Byzantine Empire
	Catepanate of Ras
Succeeded by
Syrmia County (medieval)
Grand Principality of Serbia

The Theme of Sirmium (Greek: θέμα Σιρμίου) was a Byzantine administrative unit (theme), which existed in present-day Serbia, Croatia and Bosnia and Herzegovina in the 11th and 12th centuries. Its capital was Sirmium (today Sremska Mitrovica).

== Background ==
In the 6th century, another Byzantine province existed in this area. It was known as Pannonia and also had its capital in Sirmium, but was much smaller in size.

In the beginning of the 11th century, the area which later became the Theme of Sirmium lay within the borders of the First Bulgarian Empire, under Tsar Samuil and the local duke (voivode) known as Sermon ruled over Sirmium and surrounding area. In a long war, the Byzantine emperor Basil II conquered Bulgaria, and established new Byzantine themes and other local governorates under generals (strategoi) on its territory. The central part of Samuil's realm became the Theme of Bulgaria and the northwestern part became the Theme of Sirmium. The bishoprics of these lands, including the bishopric of Sirmium, are mentioned as the westernmost eparchies of the Archbishopric of Ohrid in 1019–20.

== Geography ==
The exact borders of the Theme of Sirmium are unclear: according to some sources, theme included region of Syrmia (on the northern bank of the Sava river) as well as parts of modern Serbia and Bosnia and Herzegovina on the southern bank of the Sava river, while, according to other sources, it extended along the southern bank of the Danube and along the river Sava.

In this time, the name "Syrmia" was used as a designation for territories on the both banks of the river Sava, while later, designations "Syrmia on this side" (in the north of the Sava river) and "Syrmia on the other side" (in the south of the Sava river) were introduced, until finally, the territory in the south of the Sava river received name "Mačva".

== History ==
After the Battle of Manzikert in 1071 and the resulting turmoil in the Byzantine Empire, the Kingdom of Hungary conquered Syrmia, but Byzantine control over the area was restored under the Komnenian emperors. In the last years of the 12th century, Byzantine power waned, and the emergence of the Second Bulgarian Empire created a new contender for the region's control. Eventually, during the 13th and 14th century, the various Serbian states would succeed in control of the region. One of these states, the Kingdom of Syrmia, was centered in the area in which Byzantine Theme of Sirmium existed.

== Governors ==
There were at least three governors, strategoi, that held the theme:

- Constantine Diogenes, 1018–29
- Theophilos Erotikos, 1040
- Ljutovid, fl. 1039–42

== See also ==
- Pannonia (Byzantine province)
- Realm of Stefan Dragutin

== Sources ==
- Brujić, Dragan (2004). Vodič kroz svet Vizantije: od Konstantina do pada Carigrada. Dina. ISBN 978-86-85275-02-9.
- Ćirković, Sima (2004). The Serbs. Malden: Blackwell Publishing. ISBN 9781405142915.
- Коматина, Ивана; Коматина, Предраг (2018). "Византијски и угарски Срем од X до XIII века" [The Byzantine and Hungarian Syrmia in the 10th-13th Centuries]. Зборник радова Византолошког института (in Serbian). 55: 141–164.
- Maksimović, Ljubomir (2008). Византијски свет и Срби. Историјски институт у Београду. ISBN 9788677430726.
- Ostrogorsky, George (1956). History of the Byzantine State. Oxford: Basil Blackwell.
- Vizantološki institut (2007). Zbornik radova. Vol. 44. SANU.
