= David Arianites =

David Areianites or Arianites (Greek: Δαυίδ Ἀρ[ε]ιανίτης) was a high-ranking Byzantine commander of the early 11th century.

== Origin ==
The origin of the surname is uncertain and different theories have been proposed ranging from various anthroponomastic and toponymic derivations of the Indo-European word arya to the name of a minor Illyrian tribe, the Arinistae/Armistae. The name "Ar[e]ianites" is hence variously considered to have been of Albanian origin. David is sometimes considered to be the first member of the Arianiti clan, which was active in late medieval Albania, but the connection can not be verified due to lack of sources.

== Life ==
David Arianites first appears in 999/1000, holding the rank of patrikios. In that year he was named by the Byzantine emperor Basil II as the doux of Thessalonica (or possibly, although this is not stated explicitly, domestikos ton scholon of the West) in succession to Nikephoros Ouranos, who was moved to the governorship of Antioch. He probably remained in the same post until ca. 1014, when Theophylact Botaneiates is attested as holding it.

In 1016, Arianites was tasked with capturing the Bulgarian fortress of Strumitza, during which expedition he captured the fortress of Thermitza as well. In 1017, Basil II invaded Bulgaria with a large army. His objective was the town of Kastoria which controlled the road between Thessaly and the coast of modern Albania. He sent parts of his army under Arianites and Constantine Diogenes to loot Pelagonia. Basil II himself managed to capture several minor Bulgarian castles but all attempts to seize Kastoria remained futile.

Following the death of Tsar Ivan Vladislav in February 1018 and the collapse of Bulgarian resistance, Basil II installed David Arianites as strategos autokrator of Skopje and katepano of conquered Bulgaria, implying powers of command over the other regional commanders in the northern Balkans (Sirmium with Ras and Dyrrhachium).

Preceded by Nikephoros Ouranos	Governor (doux) of Thessalonica; 999/1000 – ca. 1014 (?)	Succeeded by Theophylact Botaneiates
New title	strategos autokrator and katepano of Bulgaria; 1018–1022/25	Succeeded by Constantine Diogenes
