= Ivats =

10/11th-century Bulgarian noble and military commander

Ivats (Bulgarian: Ивац) or Ibatzes was a Bulgarian noble and military commander in the late 10th and early 11th centuries. He served three Bulgarian Emperors: Samuil (997–1014); Gavril Radomir (1014–1015) and Ivan Vladislav (1015–1018).

In 1015, he defeated a Byzantine army in the battle of Bitola and stopped the disastrous campaign of Basil II in the heart of the Bulgarian Empire. After the death of Ivan Vladislav and the surrender of the Empress, the Patriarch and many nobles to the Byzantines, he chose to continue the struggle along the sons of the dead Emperor and several other nobles. His stronghold was the fortress Tomornitsa in Mount Tomor, modern south-eastern Albania. The fortress was soon besieged by Basil II but the 55-day siege was unsuccessful for the Byzantines. In August 1018 he was treacherously blinded by the Byzantine strategos Eustathios Daphnomeles.
