= Battle of Strumica =

Coordinates: 41°23′07.1″N 22°36′20.9″E

- Part of the Byzantine–Bulgarian wars
Date	August 1014
Location	near Strumica, present-day North Macedonia
Result	Bulgarian victory

Belligerents
Bulgarian Empire	Byzantine Empire

Commanders and leaders
Gavril Radomir	Theophylactus Botaniates †

Strength
Unknown	Unknown

Casualties and losses
Light	Heavy

The Battle of Strumica took place in August 1014, near Strumica (or Strumitsa), present-day North Macedonia, between Bulgarian and Byzantine forces. Bulgarian troops under Emperor Samuil's son Gavril Radomir defeated the army of the governor of Thessaloniki, Theophylactus Botaniates, who perished in the battle. After his death the Byzantine Emperor Basil II was forced to pull back from Bulgaria and was unable to take advantage of his success in the recent Battle of Kleidion.

== The battle ==
After his victory on 29 July 1014, when a large part of the Bulgarian army was destroyed, Basil II marched westwards and seized the small fortress of Matsukion near Strumitsa, but the town itself remained in Bulgarian hands. That is why the Byzantine Emperor sent an army led by one of his most capable generals, Theophylactus Botaniates, to destroy the palisades to the south of the town, which had been built by Samuil before the campaign. Thus he would clear the way of the Byzantines to Thessaloniki through the valley of the Vardar river.

He [Botaniates] marched on and the Bulgarians who guarded the surroundings allowed him to make his way undisturbed. But when he was preparing to go back to the Emperor after he had fulfilled his orders, he was ambushed in a long gorge. When he entered he was surrounded and fired with stones and arrows; he was killed and no one could help him...

— John Skylitzes, Historia, v. II, p. 66

The historian Vasil Zlatarski specifies the battlefield at the Kosturino gorge between the mountains Belasitsa and Plavush. The Byzantines could not organize their defense in the narrow pass and were annihilated. Most of their troops perished including their commander. According to bishop Michael of Devol, Botaniates was killed by the heir to the Bulgarian throne Gavril Radomir, who pierced the Byzantine general with his spear. Upon the news of that unexpected and heavy defeat, Basil II was forced to immediately retreat eastwards and not through the planned route via Thessaloniki. He also lifted the siege of Strumitsa. In order to break the spirit of the Bulgarians, Basil II blinded thousands of soldiers previously captured at Kleidion and sent them to Samuil.

== Sources ==
- John Skylitzes. Synopsis Historion, translated by Paul Stephenson.
- Подбрани извори за българската история, Том II: Българските държави и българите през Средновековието, Изд. "ТАНГРА ТанНакРа ИК", София 2004, ISBN 954-9942-40-6, с. 66-67
- Мутафчиев, Петър, Книга за българите, Издателство на БАН, София 1992, ISBN 954-430-128-3, с. 118-119
- Златарски, Васил, История на българската държава през средните векове, том 1, част 2, Академично издателство "Марин Дринов", София 1994, ISBN 954-430-299-9 (т. 1, ч. 2), с. 738 (с. 697-700 в електронно издание)
- Пириватрич, Сърджан, Самуиловата държава. Обхват и характер, Изд. група "АГАТА-А", София 2000, ISBN 954-540-020-X, с. 137
- Гюзелев, Васил, България от втората четвърт на Х до началото на ХІ век, с. 71, 74, в: Димитров, Илчо (ред.), Кратка история на България, изд. "Наука и изкуство", София 1983
- Zlatarski, Vasil, History of Bulgaria in the Middle Ages (Istoria na balgarskata darzhava prez srednite vekove, История на българската държава през средните векове), in Bulgarian, Vol. 1, Part 2, Marin Drinov Academic Publishers, Sofia, 1994, ISBN 954-430-299-9 (That work can be found in the Internet, taken from the site "Books for Macedonia" (in Bulgarian) Archived 2014-07-21 at the Wayback Machine on 29.01.2008)
- Gyuzelev, Vasil, Bulgaria from the second quarter of the tenth century to the beginning of the 11th century, (Balgaria ot vtorata chetvart na X do nachaloto na XI vek, България от втората четвърт на Х до началото на ХІ век), in Bulgarian, In: Dimitrov, Ilcho (Ed.), Short History of Bulgaria (Kratka istoria na Balgaria, Кратка история на България), in Bulgarian, Science and Arts Publishers, Sofia 1983
