= Autokrator =

Greek epithet for one with absolute power

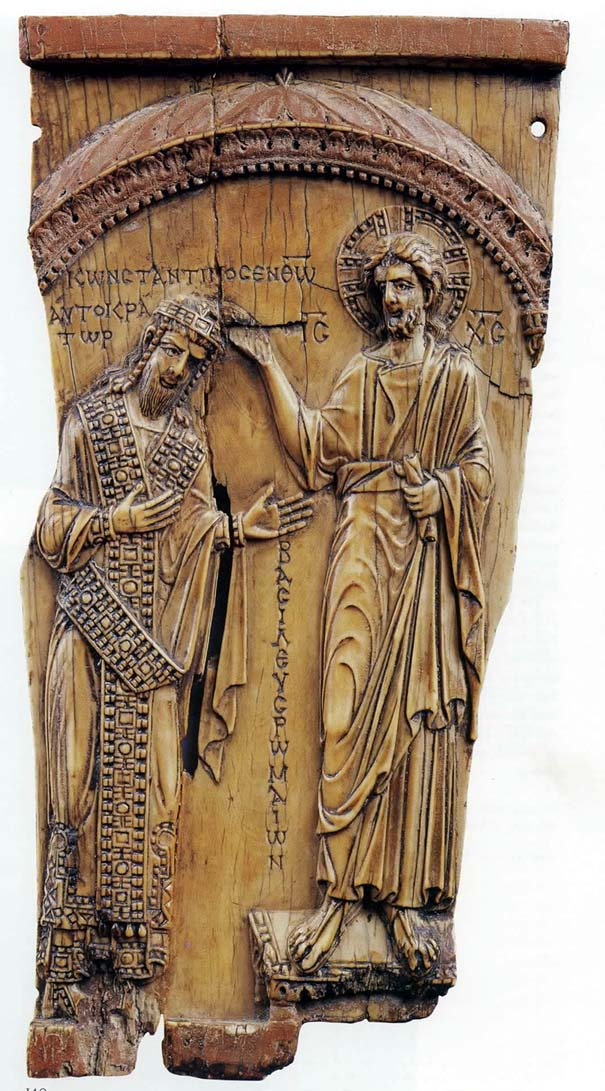
Ivory plaque with Emperor Constantine VII being crowned by Christ. The legend reads: "Constantine, in God [faithful], autokratōr and basileus of the Romans.

Autokrator or Autocrator (Ancient Greek: αὐτοκράτωρ, romanized: autokrátōr, lit. 'self-ruler', from αὐτός, autós, 'self' + κράτος, krátos, 'dominion') is a Greek epithet applied to an individual who is unrestrained by superiors. It has been applied to military commanders-in-chief as well as Roman and Byzantine emperors as the translation of the Latin title imperator. Its connection with Byzantine and Russian-style absolutism gave rise to the modern terms autocracy and autocrat.

== Ancient Greece ==
The title appeared in Classical Greece in the late 5th century BC, and was used for generals given independent authority, i.e. a supreme commander (στρατηγὸς αὐτοκράτωρ, stratēgòs autokrátōr). In Classical Athens, stratēgoì autokrátores were generals endowed with autonomous power of command, i.e. they were able to make certain military and diplomatic decisions without prior consultation with the Athenian assembly. This was enacted when the general was expected to operate far from Athens, for instance during the Sicilian Expedition. Nevertheless, the generals remained accountable to the assembly for their conduct upon their return. Similar practices were followed by other Greek states, such as Syracuse, where the post served as a power base for several of the city's tyrants. Stratēgoì autokrátores were also appointed by various leagues of city-states to head their combined armies. Thus Philip II of Macedon was declared as hēgemṓn (ἡγεμών, 'leader') and stratēgòs autokrátōr of the southern Greek states by the League of Corinth, a position later given to his son Alexander the Great as well. The term was also employed for envoys entrusted with plenipotentiary powers (πρέσβεις αὐτοκράτορες, présbeis autokrátores, 'elder autocrats').

== Rome and Byzantium ==
In later times, with the rise of the Roman Republic, [stratēgòs] autokrátōr was used by Greek historians to translate different Roman terms: Polybius uses the term to translate the title dictator, while Plutarch uses it in its later sense as a translation of the victory title imperator. Autokrátōr became entrenched as the official translation of the latter during the Roman Empire, where imperator was part of the titulature of the Roman emperors. As such it continued to be used in Greek translations from Latin until the adoption of the Greek title basileús by Emperor Heraclius in 629.

It was retained in archaic forms of address during ceremonies in the East Roman (Byzantine) Empire, and was revived (no later than the early 9th century) in the form of basileùs [kaì] autokrátōr (βασιλεὺς [καὶ] αὐτοκράτωρ, usually translated as "emperor and autocrat"), which then designated the senior of several ruling co-emperors (συμβασιλεῖς, symbasileis), who held the actual power. In the Palaiologan period, this use was extended to include the designated heir. The title is evidenced in coins from 912, in imperial chrysobulls from the 11th century, and in numerous illuminated manuscripts. The term stratēgòs autokrátōr continued to be used in the Byzantine period as well. The title is particularly prevalent in the 6th century (e.g. for Belisarius), and re-appears in the 10th–11th centuries for senior military commanders. Thus, for instance, Basil II installed David Arianites as stratēgòs autokrátōr of Bulgaria, implying powers of command over the other regional stratēgoí in the northern Balkans.

== Other nations ==
The Byzantine imperial formula was imitated among the Byzantine influenced nations such as Georgia and Balkan states, and later, most notably Russia, beginning with the reign of Ivan III.

- Ottoman sultan Bayezid II titled himself "By the grace of God, basileus and autokrator of the two continents of Asia and Europe and other possessions".
- One of the titles of Georgian kings of Bagrationi dynasty was "Autocrat of all the east and the west", title introduced during David IV and lasted until dissolution of the unified Georgian monarchy during the reign of George VIII, and later dissolution officially confirmed at 1490.
- The rulers of the Second Bulgarian Empire used the title "Emperor (Tsar) of the Bulgarians", in the early reigns with the addition of "and the Vlachs", but Ivan Asen II (r. 1218–41), who after the Battle of Klokotnitsa in 1230 expanded his control over most of the Byzantine Empire's former European possessions, also adopted the title of "Tsar and autokrator of all the Bulgarians and the Greeks", a title which had first been claimed by Prince Simeon I (r. 893–927).
- Similarly, when the Serbian king Stefan Dušan claimed the imperial title in 1345/46, he used the title "basileus and autokrator of Serbia and of Romania" in Greek, and "Tsar of the Serbs and Greeks" in Serbian. The use of "Romania" (i.e. the land of the Romans, the Byzantine Empire) and not the usual Byzantine formula "of the Romans" signified that although he claimed the direct succession to all Byzantine emperors from the time of Constantine the Great, he lacked possession of Constantinople and of the Ecumenical Patriarchate, which alone conferred full legitimacy.
- Deriving from this usage, the Russian tsars, from the establishment of the Russian Empire up to the fall of the Russian monarchy in 1917, used the formula "Emperor and Autocrat of All the Russias". Ivan III as grand prince styled himself as autocrat, while Feodor I was the first to be crowned as both tsar and autocrat. The title samoderzhets (autocrat) became standard in the title of the tsar from the 17th century. In the Slavic languages, the title was used in a translated form (Bulgarian: самодържец, samodarzhets, Serbian: самодржац, samodržac; Russian: самодержец, samoderzhets).
