= Bulgarian Orthodox Church in Hungary =

Eastern Orthodox Christian church in Hungary

- Българска православна църква в Унгария (Bulgarian); Magyarországi Bolgár Ortodox Egyház (Hungarian)
- Classification: Christian
- Orientation: Eastern Orthodox
- Scripture: Septuagint; New Testament
- Theology: Eastern Orthodox theology
- Liturgy: Byzantine Rite
- Headquarters: Budapest
- Territory: Hungary
- Origin: 1916; Budapest

The Bulgarian Orthodox Church in Hungary (Bulgarian: Българска православна църква в Унгария; Hungarian: Magyarországi Bolgár Ortodox Egyház) is an Eastern Orthodox Christian church in Hungary. It is the oldest Bulgarian Orthodox community outside Bulgaria; its Budapest headquarters served as the first seat of the Bulgarian Orthodox Church’s Diocese of Western and Central Europe.

== History ==
Budapest became one of the major destinations for the large-scale emigration of Bulgarians that began in the 19th century. The Association of Bulgarians in Hungary began its activities in 1914, and the first Bulgarian parish in Hungary was established in 1916.

In 1930 the City of Budapest donated a piece of land to the Bulgarian community in Ferencváros for the construction of an Orthodox church. The church is a unique architectural treasure, as it is the only Byzantine-style building in Budapest.

== Organization ==
Operates as an officially registered church. It belongs to the Diocese of Western and Central Europe of the Bulgarian Orthodox Church. It has two parishes, one in Budapest and one in Pécs.

== Pictures ==
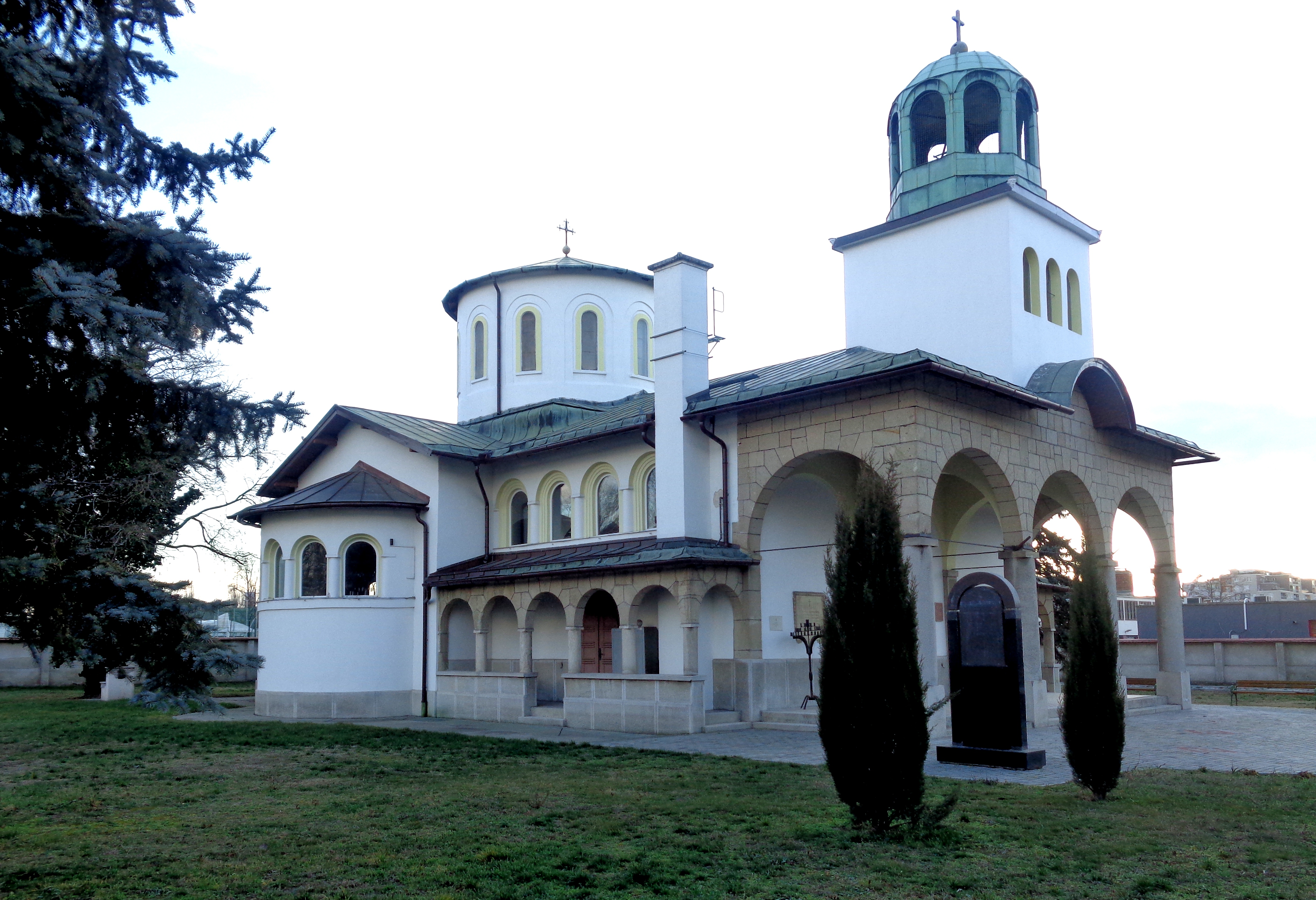
Church of St. Cyril and Methodius in Budapest

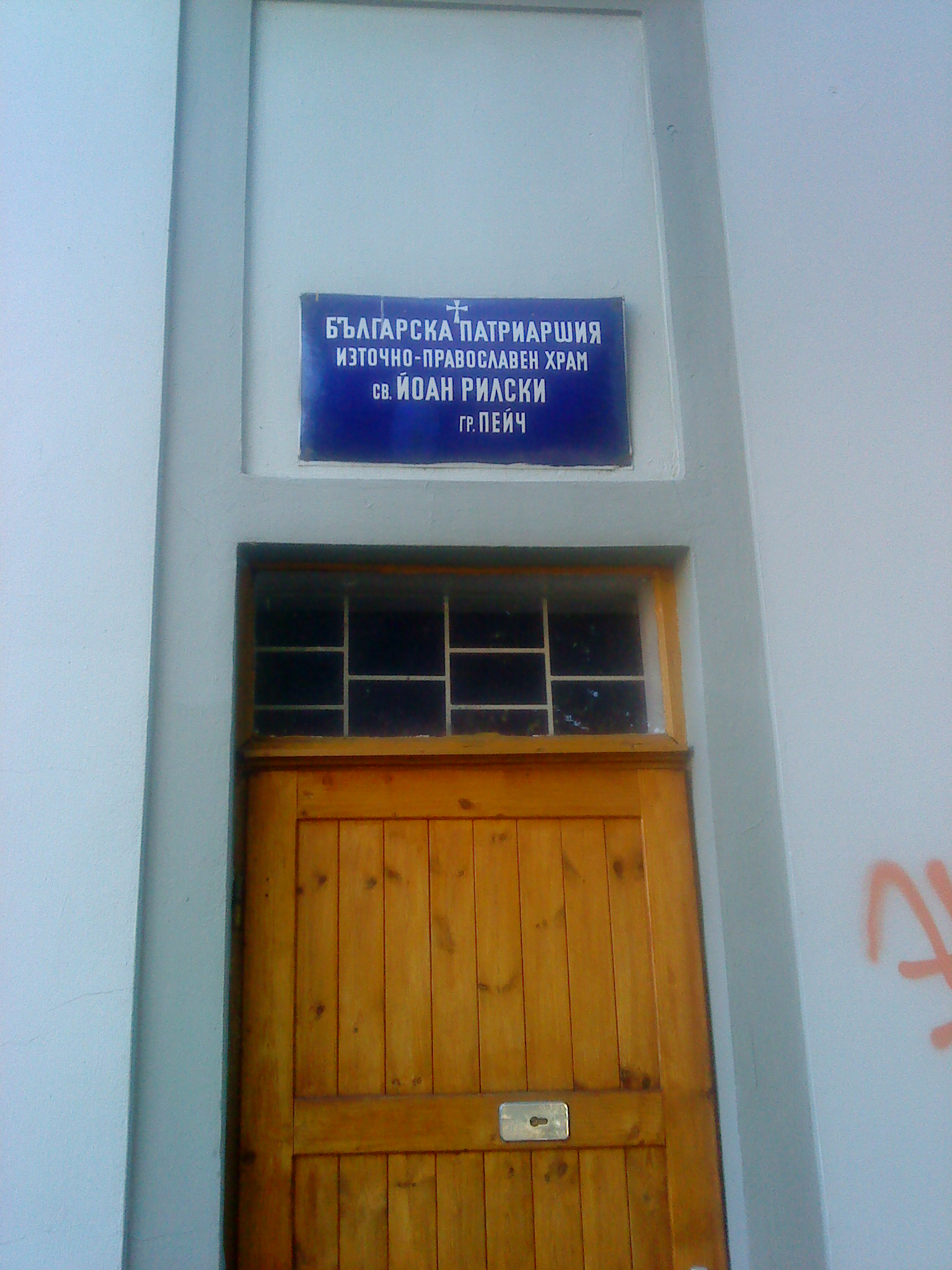
Bulgarian Orthodox Chapel in Pécs

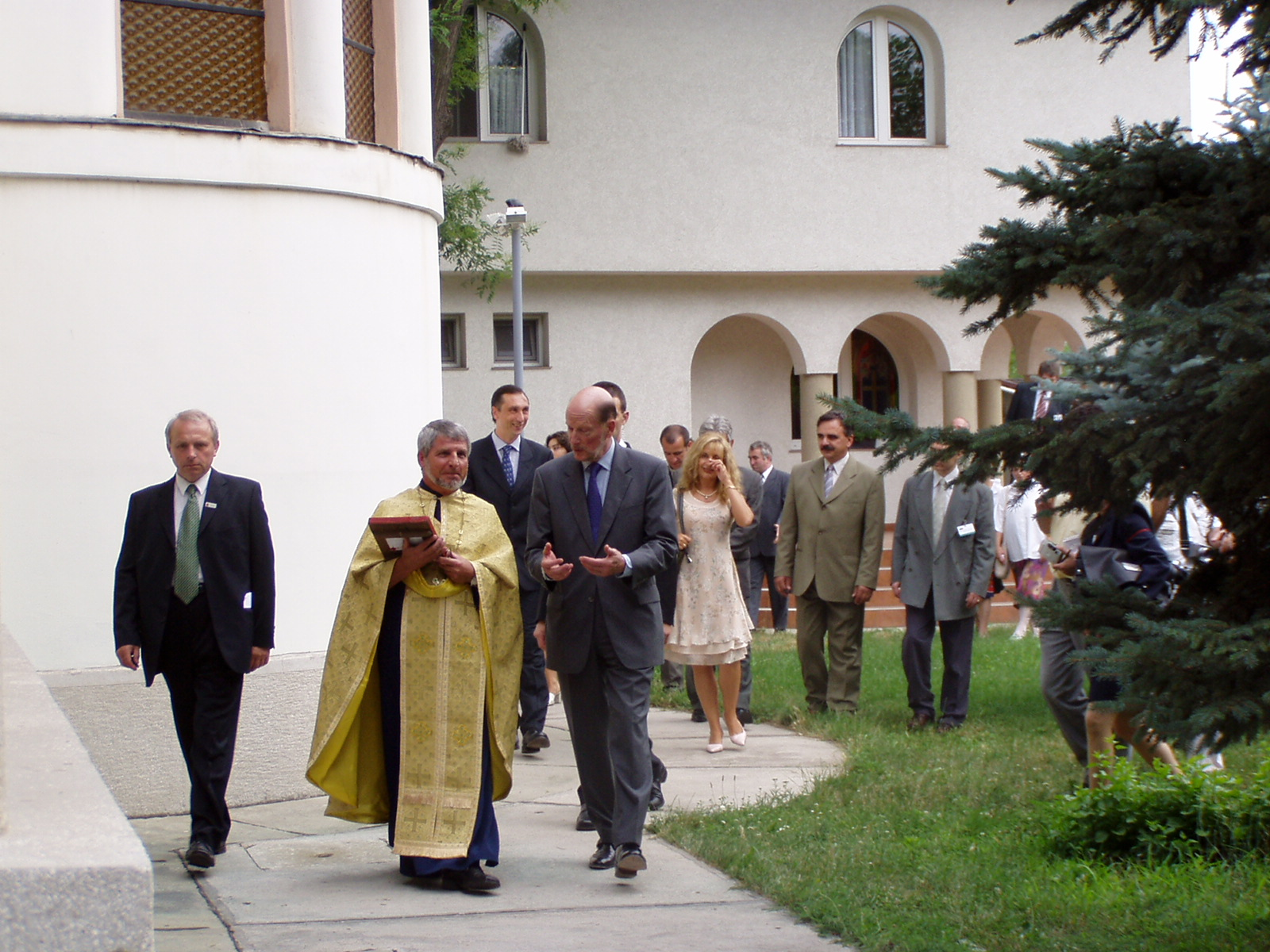
Former Bulgarian Prime Minister Saks-Coburg-Gotha visits the Church of St. Cyril and Methodius
