= Battle of Kleidion =

1014 battle of the Byzantine–Bulgarian Wars

- Part of the Byzantine–Bulgarian wars
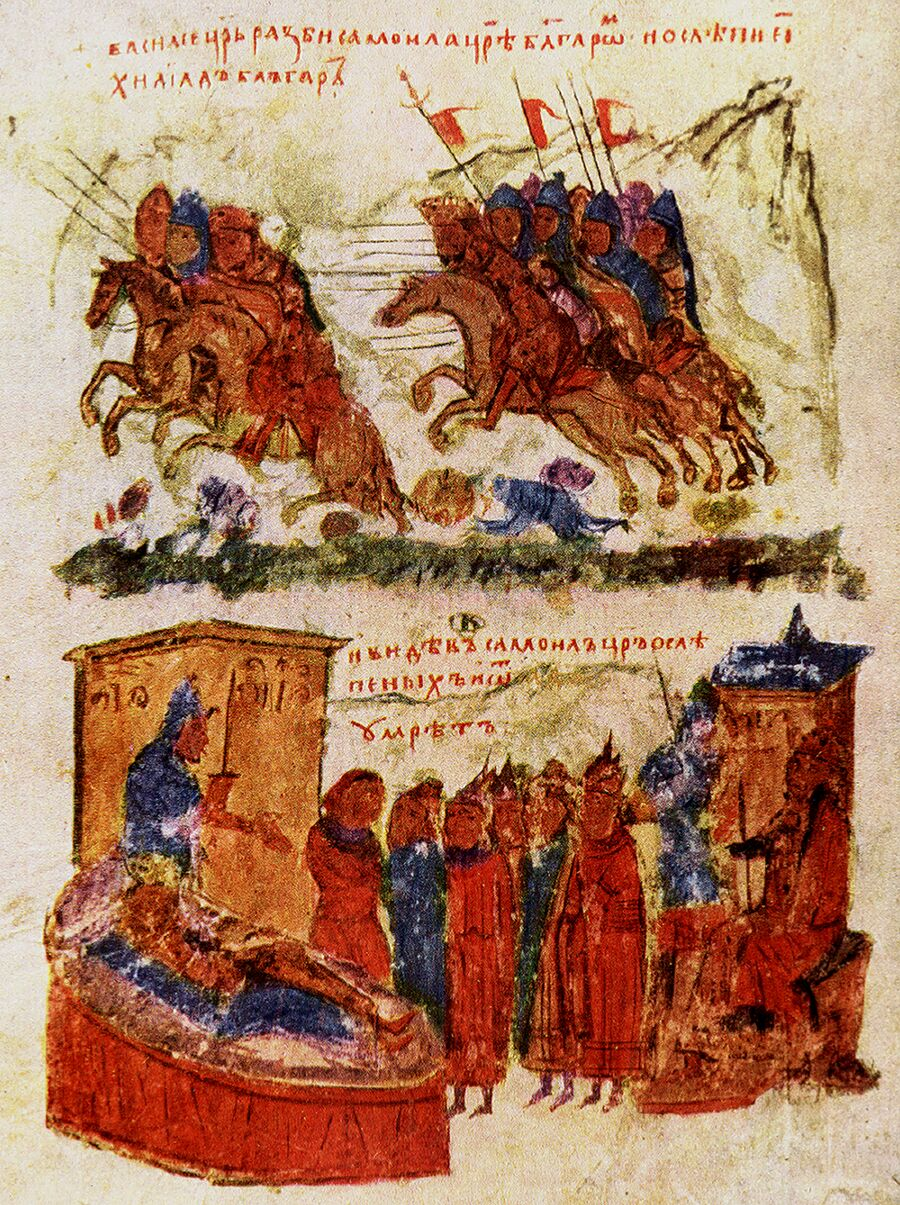
- The Byzantines defeat the Bulgarians at Kleidion and Tsar Samuel becomes unconscious at the sight of his blinded army. Scene from the Manasses Chronicle.
Date	29 July 1014
Location	Belasitsa Mountains, close to the village of Klyuch, modern Blagoevgrad Province, Bulgaria 41°21′45″N 23°01′03″E
Result	Byzantine victory

Belligerents
Byzantine Empire	Bulgarian Empire

Commanders and leaders
Basil II; Nikephoros Xiphias; Constantine Diogenes; Theophylaktos Botaneiates †	Samuel of Bulgaria; Gabriel Radomir

Strength
Unknown	Unknown

Casualties and losses
Unknown	Devastating entire forces, 15,000 captured
- Battle site indicated on a map of modern Bulgaria Battle of Kleidion (Greece) Battle of Kleidion (North Macedonia)

The Battle of Kleidion (Ancient Greek: Κλειδίον; or Clidium, after the medieval name of the village of Klyuch, lit. 'key'; also known as the Battle of Belasitsa) took place on 29 July 1014, between the Byzantine Empire and the Bulgarian Empire. It was the culmination of the nearly half-century struggle between the Byzantine Emperor Basil II and the Bulgarian emperor Samuel in the late 10th and early 11th centuries. The result was a decisive Byzantine victory.

The battle took place in the valley between the mountains of Belasitsa and Ograzhden, near the modern Bulgarian village of Klyuch. The decisive encounter occurred on 29 July with an attack in the rear by a force under the Byzantine general Nikephoros Xiphias, who had infiltrated the Bulgarian positions. The ensuing battle was a major defeat for the Bulgarians. Thousands of Bulgarian soldiers were captured and blinded by order of Basil II, who would subsequently be known as the "Bulgar-Slayer". Samuel survived the battle, but died two months later from a heart attack, reportedly brought on by the sight of his blind soldiers.

Although the engagement did not end the First Bulgarian Empire, the Battle of Kleidion reduced its ability to resist Byzantine advances, and it has been considered the pivotal encounter of the war with Byzantium.

== Background ==
The origins of the conflict date back to the 7th century, when the Bulgars under Khan Asparukh established a state along the Danube in one of the provinces of the Byzantine Empire. As a result, the Bulgarian state fought a series of wars with Byzantium in order to secure its continued existence.

In 968, Bulgaria was invaded from the north by the Kievan prince Sviatoslav. By that time, the Bulgarian Empire, which had once threatened the existence of Byzantium under the reign of Simeon, had lost much of its power. During the conflict, the Kievan raids were repeatedly defeated by the Byzantines, who were also at war with the Bulgarians, a continuous conflict since the fall of the Bulgarian capital Preslav in 971. This war had resulted in the Bulgarian emperor Boris II being forced to renounce his imperial title in Constantinople, and eastern Bulgaria came under Byzantine rule. The Byzantines assumed that this act would signify the end of independent Bulgaria, but the western Bulgarian lands remained autonomous and under the Comitopuli brothers David, Moses, Aaron and Samuel, resistance against the Byzantines emerged.

When the Byzantine emperor Basil II ascended the throne in 976, he made the destruction of independent Bulgaria his first ambition. Opposing him were the western Bulgarians, now led by Samuel of Bulgaria. Basil II's first campaign was disastrous, the Emperor barely escaping with his life when the Bulgarians annihilated the Byzantine army in the Gates of Trajan Pass in 986.

Over the next fifteen years, while Basil was preoccupied with revolts against his rule and the Fatimid threat in the east, Samuel retook most of the previously conquered Bulgarian lands and carried the war into enemy territory in a series of campaigns. However, his invasion of southern Greece, that reached as far as Corinth, resulted in a major defeat in the Battle of Spercheios in 996. The next phase of the war began in 1000, when Basil, having secured his own position, launched a series of offensives against Bulgaria. He secured Moesia, and in 1003, his forces took Vidin. The next year, Basil inflicted a heavy defeat on Samuel in the Battle of Skopie. By 1005, Basil had regained control of Thessaly and parts of southern Macedonia. Over these and the next few years, a regular pattern emerged: the Byzantines would campaign in Bulgaria, laying siege to forts and pillaging the countryside, while the numerically inferior Bulgarians, unable to offer direct opposition, launched diversionary raids in Macedonia and Greece. Despite some successes, these did not achieve any permanent results, nor did they force Basil to abandon his campaigns in Bulgaria. A counter-attack in 1009 failed at the Battle of Kreta, and although the Byzantines themselves did not achieve any decisive success, their methodical war of attrition deprived the Bulgarians of their strongholds and gradually weakened their forces.

In the words of Byzantine historian John Skylitzes: "The Emperor Basil II continued to invade Bulgaria each year and destroy and devastate everything on his way. Samuel could not stop him in the open field or engage the Emperor in a decisive battle, and suffered many defeats and began to lose his strength." The culmination of the war came in 1014, when Samuel, at the head of his army, resolved to stop the Byzantine army before it could enter the Bulgarian heartland.

== Prelude ==
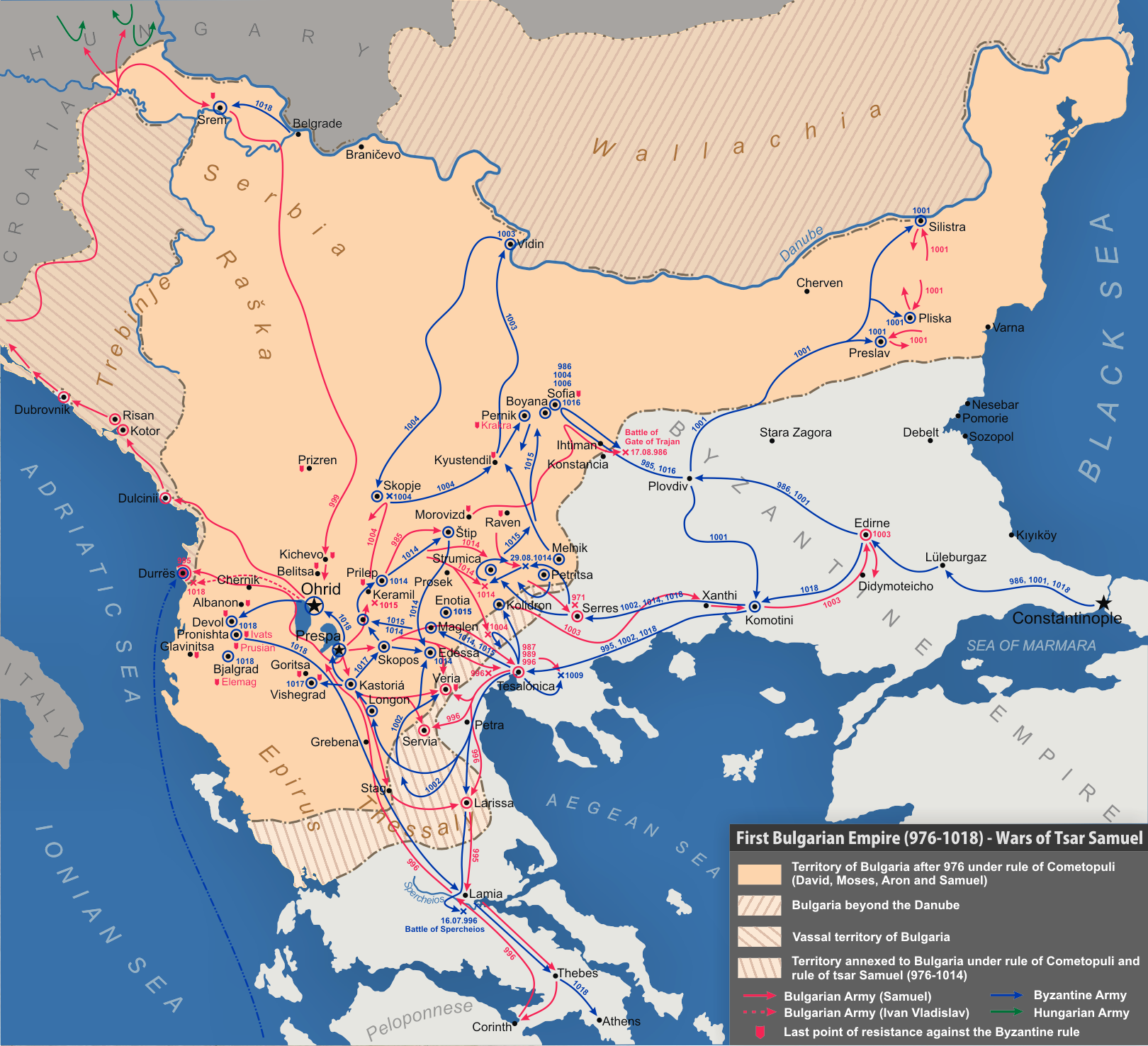
Map of Bulgaria and Byzantium c.1000

Samuel knew that the Byzantine army would have to invade the country through a series of mountain passes, and so took precautions to bar them. The Bulgarians built ditches along the frontier and fortified many of the valleys and passes with walls and towers, especially the pass of Kleidion on the Struma River which Basil would need to pass through to reach the heart of Bulgaria. Samuel heavily fortified the northern slopes of the Belasitsa mountain to the south and east of Strumitsa Castle. The wide valley of the Strumitsa River was a convenient place for attack and it had been used by Byzantine forces for this purpose in previous years. The Bulgarians disposed a strong guard to keep the pass safe. In addition, the Bulgarian ruler chose Strumitsa for his defensive base — it was located on the road from Thessaloniki leading to Thrace to the east and Ohrid to the west. The rugged terrain to the south was dotted with earthworks and walls guarded by strong Bulgarian units.

Samuel's decision to face Basil II and the bulk of his army at Kleidion was not only prompted by the constant defeats and invasions which had devastated the country, but also by concerns over his authority among the nobility, which had been fatally weakened by Basil's campaigns. In 1005 for example, the governor of the important Adriatic port of Dyrrhachium had surrendered the town to Basil II. To face this threat, Samuel gathered a large army to face the Byzantines, some claiming it numbered as many as 45,000 soldiers. Basil II also prepared carefully, assembling a large army of his own and taking his most experienced commanders, including the governor of Philippopolis (modern Plovdiv), Nicephorus Xiphias, who had conquered the old Bulgarian capitals Pliska and Preslav from Samuel in 1001.

== Battle ==
The Byzantine army marched from Constantinople through Komotini, Drama and Serres and reached the Rupel pass on the Struma river. From there the army entered the Strumitsa valley and reached the vicinity of the village of Klyuch, where the river bent and approached Belasitsa and Ograzhden. There the army was stopped by a thick wooden wall, defended by Bulgarian soldiers. The Byzantines attacked the palisade immediately, but were repulsed with heavy casualties.

In response, Samuel sent a large army under one of the most able Bulgarian nobles, Nestoritsa, to strike southwards and draw the attention of Basil away from the siege at Klyuch. Nestoritsa's Bulgarians reached Thessalonika, but Byzantine troops under Theophylact Botaneiates, the strategos (governor-general) of the city and his son Mihail managed to defeat them outside the city walls in a bloody battle. Theophylactus captured many soldiers and a large quantity of military equipment and marched north to join Basil at Klyuch.

Basil's first attempt to overwhelm the defenders of the pass was unsuccessful and his army was unable to pass through the valley, which was defended by 15,000–20,000 Bulgarians. Despite the difficulties the Byzantine Emperor did not abandon the attack. He ordered his general Nicephorus Xiphias to manoeuvre his troops around the high Belasitsa mountain and threaten the Bulgarians from behind, while he continued the assaults on the wall. Xiphias led his troops along a steep path that led him into the Bulgarians' rear. On 29 July, Xiphias attacked the Bulgarian defenders, trapping them in the valley. The Bulgarians abandoned their towers to face this new threat and Basil was able to break through the front line and destroy the wall.

In the confusion of the rout, thousands of Bulgarian troops were killed and the remainder desperately attempted to flee westwards. Samuel and his son Gabriel Radomir immediately headed to the east from their headquarters in the Strumitsa fortress to aid their army, but in desperate fighting near the village of Mokrievo (present-day North Macedonia) they were overwhelmed by the quickly advancing enemy. Many Bulgarian soldiers were killed at Mokrievo and many more were captured. Emperor Samuel himself barely escaped, only breaking free through the bravery of his son, who mounted his father on his own horse and took him to safety in Prilep. From Prilep, Samuel returned to Prespa while Gabriel Radomir headed towards Strumitsa to continue the struggle.

== Further developments ==
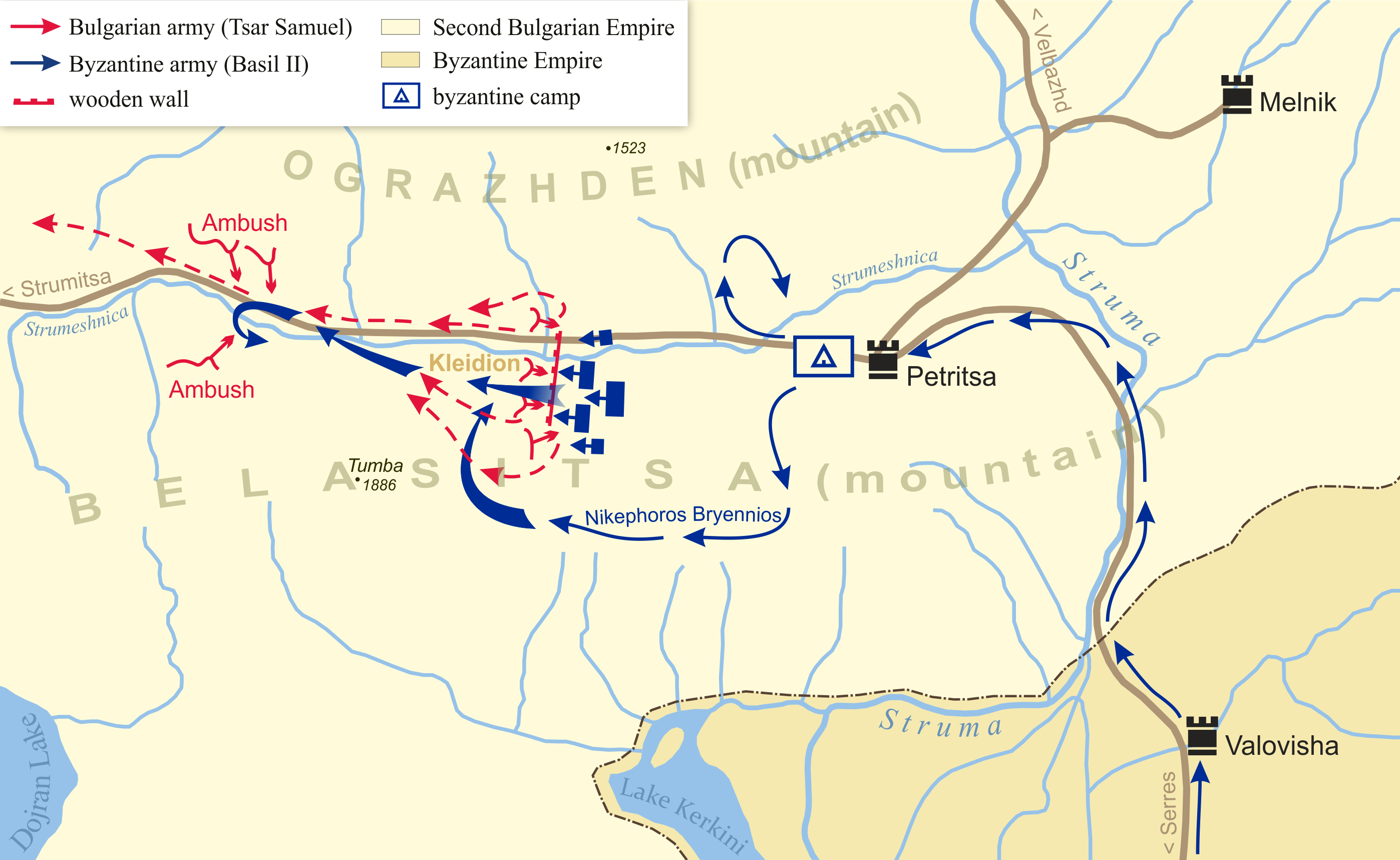
Battle of Kleidion

After his victory, Basil II advanced towards Strumitsa, which was key to holding the whole Vardar valley. On their way to the city, the Byzantines seized the Matsukion fortress to the east of their advance. The Byzantine Emperor also sent an army under Botaneiates to surround Strumitsa and destroy all ramparts to the south and clear the passage to Thessalonica. With the remainder of his troops, Basil laid siege to the city itself. The Bulgarians allowed Botaneiates to destroy the fortifications, but he and his army were ambushed by Bulgarian raiders in a narrow valley, soon after their task was complete. In the ensuing battle Botaneiates was completely defeated and the Bulgarian commander Gabriel Radomir personally stabbed Botaneiates with his spear. As a result, Basil II was forced to abandon the siege of Strumitsa and retreat. On the return, the eloquence of the cubicularius Sergius convinced the defenders of Melnik to surrender, another heavy blow for the Bulgarians as the town guarded the main road to Sofia from the south.

=== Prisoners ===
Skylitzes records that Basil completely routed the Bulgarian army and took 15,000 prisoners (14,000 according to Kekaumenos). Modern historians, however, such as Vasil Zlatarski, claim that these numbers are exaggerated. The 14th century Bulgarian translation of the Manasses Chronicle numbers the prisoners at 8,000. Basil divided the prisoners into groups of 100 men, blinded 99 men in each group and left one man in each with one eye so that he could lead the others home; this was done in retaliation for the death of Botaneiates, who was Basil's favourite general and advisor, and also to crush the Bulgarian morale. Another possible reason was that, from the Byzantine perspective, the Bulgarians were rebels against their authority, and blinding was the usual punishment meted out to rebels. For this action, Basil gained the nickname Boulgaroktonos (Greek: Βουλγαροκτόνος, Bulgarian: Българоубиец), "the Bulgar-slayer". Samuel died of a heart attack on 6 October 1014, reportedly due to seeing his soldiers blinded.

== Aftermath ==
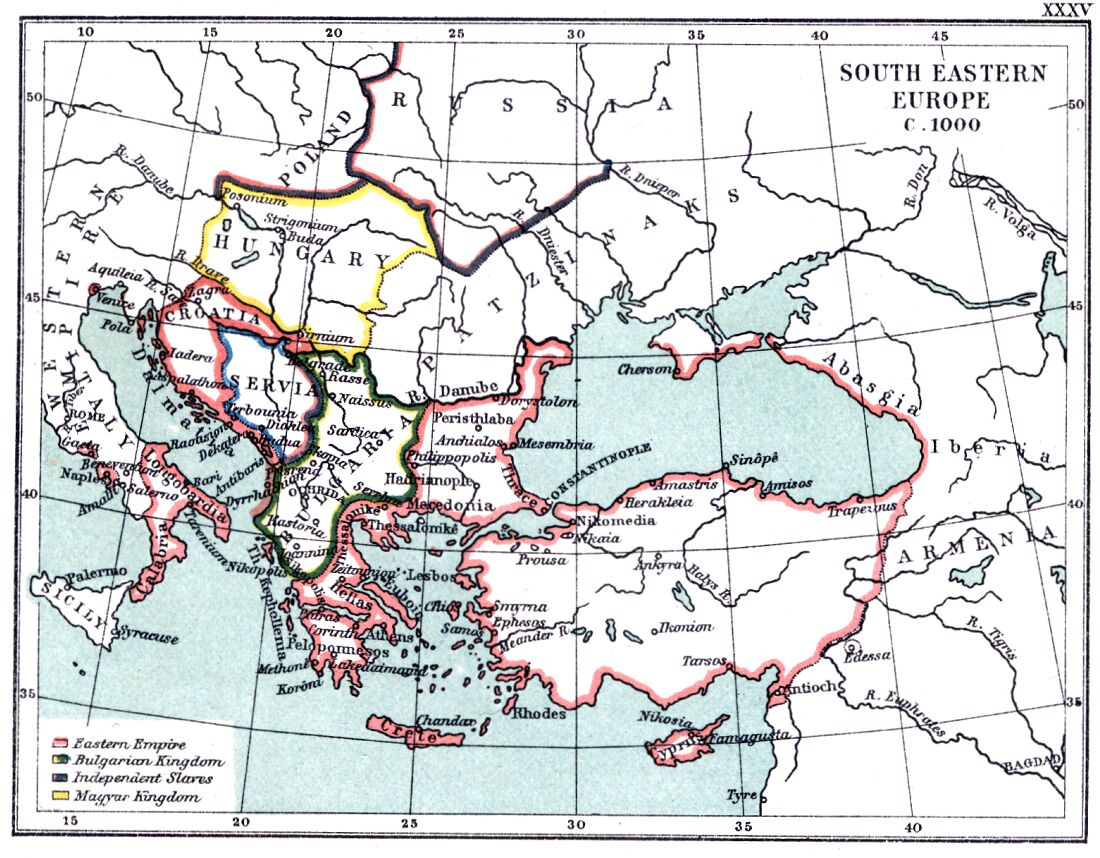
South-eastern Europe c.1000. The Byzantine possessions and independent western Bulgaria are depicted. By that time, eastern Bulgaria was also in Bulgarian hands.

The death of Botaneiates and the four more years of war that followed indicate that the Byzantine success was not complete. Some modern historians doubt that the Bulgarian defeat was as complete as described by Skylitzes and Kekaumenos. Other historians emphasize that the death of Emperor Samuel two months later was much more fateful for Bulgaria. His heirs Gabriel Radomir and Ivan Vladislav were unable to effectively resist the attacks of Basil II, and Bulgaria was completely defeated in 1018. In that year Emperor Ivan Vladislav was killed in a battle at Dyrrhachium, and Bulgaria became a province of the Byzantine Empire until the successful uprising led by the Asen brothers in 1185.

Other theses in the historiography stress the significance of the battle. As a result of the battle of Belasitsa, the Bulgarian army suffered heavy casualties that could not be restored. The ability of the central government to control the peripheral and interior provinces of the Empire was reduced and the actions of the local and provincial governors became more decisive for the outcome of the war with Byzantium. Many of them voluntarily surrendered to Basil II.

The battle also affected the Serbs and the Croats, who were forced to acknowledge the supremacy of the Byzantine Emperor after 1018. The borders of the Byzantine Empire were restored to the Danube for the first time since the 7th century, allowing Byzantium to control the entire Balkan Peninsula from the Danube to the Peloponnese and from the Adriatic Sea to the Black Sea.
