= Sermon (duke) =

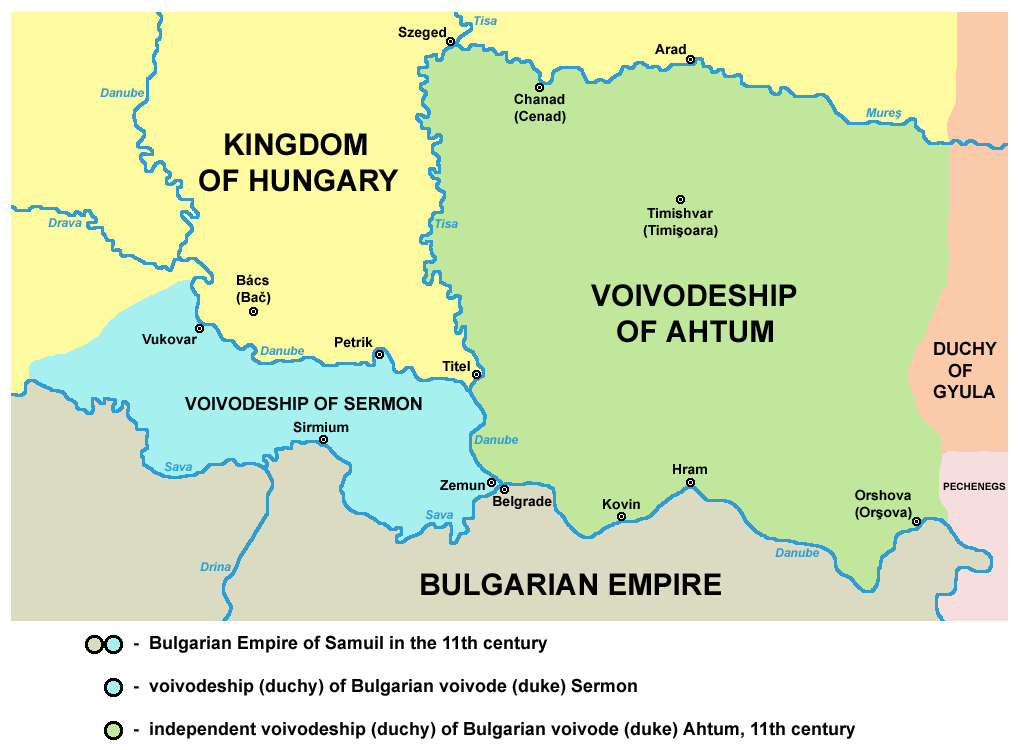
Voivodship of Sermon.

Sermon (Greek: Σέρμων; Bulgarian and Serbian Cyrillic: Сермон) was an early 11th-century voivode (duke) of Syrmia and a local governor in the First Bulgarian Empire, vassal of Bulgarian emperor Samuil. His residence was in Sirmium (today Sremska Mitrovica, Serbia). He was described in Byzantine sources as: "ruler of Syrmia and brother of Nestongos" (Greek: ὁ τοῦ Σιρμίου κρατῶν ἀδελφὸς τοῦ Νεστόγγου).

== Identity and history ==
Very little is known about him. Even his name may be simply a corruption of the name of Sirmium, added in the text of John Skylitzes in a later commentary. He had a brother, Nestongos, about whom nothing further is known, but who may have been an ancestor of the Nestongos aristocratic family that appears in Byzantium in the 11th–14th centuries.

Following the death of the Bulgarian Tsar Ivan Vladislav in early 1018, Bulgarian resistance against the Byzantine emperor Basil II collapsed. Basil therefore sent his generals to extend his control over the local lords of the northern and western Balkans. While most of them submitted and recognized the emperor's authority, Sermon refused. Consequently, the local Byzantine governor, Constantine Diogenes invited Sermon to a meeting at the estuary of the river Sava in the Danube, where each would only be accompanied by three attendants. Diogenes had hidden his sword in the folds of his clothes, and struck Sermon down. He then marched his army into Sirmium, taking possession of the town. Sermon's wife was sent as a captive to Constantinople, where she married a senior Byzantine official.

== Archaeology ==
Three golden coins produced by Sermon have been found near Novi Sad, in one vineyard in Petrovaradin, which means that this area was also under Sermon's rule. These golden coins are today kept in the Musée de la Ville de Paris, where they are labeled as "Monnaies d'or d'un chef bulgare du XI siècle, Sermon gouverneur de Sirmium" (the golden coins of one Bulgarian ruler from the 11th century, Sermon, the governor of Syrmia). The inscription on the coins is in Medieval Greek, and the English translation of the inscription is: "Madonna, please help Sermon, the duke".

== Literature ==
- Veljko Milković, Petrovaradin i Srem - misterija prošlosti, Novi Sad, 2003.
- Monografija Starih Ledinaca, Novi Sad, 1998.

== See also ==
- History of Serbia
- History of Syrmia
- History of Vojvodina
- Rulers of Vojvodina
- Sirmium
- Sremska Mitrovica
- Syrmia (theme)

== Sources ==
- Ćirković, Sima (2004). The Serbs. Malden: Blackwell Publishing. ISBN 9781405142915.
- Holmes, Catherine (2005). Basil II and the Governance of Empire (976–1025). Oxford: Oxford University Press. ISBN 978-0-19-927968-5.
- Коматина, Ивана; Коматина, Предраг (2018). "Византијски и угарски Срем од X до XIII века" [The Byzantine and Hungarian Syrmia in the 10th-13th Centuries]. Зборник радова Византолошког института (in Serbian). 55: 141–164.
- Lilie, Ralph-Johannes; Ludwig, Claudia; Zielke, Beate; Pratsch, Thomas, eds. (2013). "Nestongos". Prosopographie der mittelbyzantinischen Zeit Online. Berlin-Brandenburgische Akademie der Wissenschaften. Nach Vorarbeiten F. Winkelmanns erstellt (in German). De Gruyter. (#25519).
- Lilie, Ralph-Johannes; Ludwig, Claudia; Zielke, Beate; Pratsch, Thomas, eds. (2013). "Sermon". Prosopographie der mittelbyzantinischen Zeit Online. Berlin-Brandenburgische Akademie der Wissenschaften. Nach Vorarbeiten F. Winkelmanns erstellt (in German). De Gruyter. (#27058).
- Thurn, Hans, ed. (1973). Ioannis Scylitzae Synopsis historiarum. Berlin and New York: De Gruyter. ISBN 9783110022858.
- Trapp, E.; Kazhdan, A. (1991). "Nestongos". In Kazhdan, Alexander (ed.). The Oxford Dictionary of Byzantium. New York and Oxford: Oxford University Press. ISBN 978-0-19-504652-6.
