= Theophilos Erotikos =

11th-century Byzantine general and governor

Theophilos Erotikos (Greek: Θεόφιλος Ἐρωτικός) was an 11th-century Byzantine strategos (general) and governor of Serbia and then Cyprus. In 1038, as governor of Serbia, he was ousted by a local rebellion against the imperial rule and its Serbian supporters. In 1042, as governor of the theme of Cyprus, Erotikos incited his subjects to rebel against imperial rule. His rebellion was quashed and he was punished by public humiliation in the imperial capital Constantinople.

== Biography ==
=== Serbian revolts ===
In 1034 Erotikos was appointed strategos of Serbia by Emperor Michael IV the Paphlagonian (r. 1034–1041) in the aftermath of the failed first revolt of Serbian archon Stefan Vojislav against Byzantine rule. With Erotikos now the highest Byzantine official in Serbia, a defeated and captured Vojislav was taken prisoner to Constantinople.

Vojislav escaped his imprisonment and returned to Serbia, where he led a second revolt in 1037–1038, this time targeting pro-Byzantine Serbian lords in the Duklja principalities of Travunija and Zahumlje as well as Erotikos himself. This second revolt succeeded. Erotikos was deposed and expelled, and Vojislav assumed sole authority of the region as "Prince of the Serbs".

=== Cyprus ===
Despite his defeat and territorial losses, Erotikos was appointed governor of Byzantine Cyprus. The death of Michael V in 1042 led to turmoil around succession, and Erotikos saw in the chaos the opportunity to rule Cyprus in his own right. He orchestrated a revolt of his own against the rule of the new emperor, Constantine IX Monomachos by inciting the local populace to rebel against the local krites (senior fiscal and judicial official). Erotikos charged the official with excessive taxation; the rebels readily murdered the krites.

The Emperor sent a fleet commanded by naval strategos Constantine Chage to stamp out the rebellion. The Byzantine forces quashed the revolt and arrested Erotikos. They took him to Constantinople and him paraded him on horseback—dressed in women's clothes—in the Hippodrome. After this public humiliation, his estates and fortune were confiscated by the state. Erotikos was given no further punishment and was set free.

== Relations ==
He was a paternal descendant of Theophilos Erotikos and a maternal relative of Manuel Erotikos Komnenos, founder of the Komnenian dynasty.

== Sources ==
- Fine, John V. A. Jr. (1991) [1983]. The Early Medieval Balkans: A Critical Survey from the Sixth to the Late Twelfth Century. Ann Arbor: University of Michigan Press. ISBN 0-472-08149-7.
- Finlay, George (1853). History of the Byzantine Empire, Volume 1. Blackwood.
- Lilie, Ralph-Johannes; Ludwig, Claudia; Pratsch, Thomas; Zielke, Beate (2013). Prosopographie der mittelbyzantinischen Zeit Online. Berlin-Brandenburgische Akademie der Wissenschaften. Nach Vorarbeiten F. Winkelmanns erstellt (in German). Berlin and Boston: De Gruyter.
- Thurn, Hans, ed. (1973). Ioannis Scylitzae Synopsis historiarum. Berlin-New York: De Gruyter.
- Zonaras, John. Annals.
