= Gavril Radomir of Bulgaria =

Tsar of Bulgaria from 1014 to 1015

Gavril Radomir Гаврил Радомир
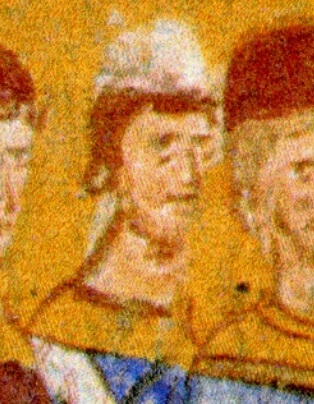

Tsar of Bulgaria
- Reign: 6 October 1014 – August 1015
- Predecessor: Samuel of Bulgaria
- Successor: Ivan Vladislav of Bulgaria
- Died: 1015
- Spouses: Margaret of Hungary; Irene of Larissa
- Issue: Peter Delyan?
- Dynasty: Cometopuli
- Father: Samuel of Bulgaria
- Mother: Agatha

Gavril Radomir (Bulgarian: Гаврил Радомир; Greek: Γαβριὴλ Ρωμανός, romanized: Gavriḗl Romanós; anglicized as Gabriel Radomir; died 1015) was the Emperor (Tsar) of the First Bulgarian Empire from October 1014 to August or September 1015. He was the son of tsar Samuel (r. 997–1014).

== Biography ==
During his father's reign, his cousin Ivan Vladislav and Ivan's entire family were all sentenced by Samuel to death for treason. Gavril's intervention saved at least his cousin. He is said to have saved his father's life in the disastrous defeat of the Battle of Spercheios, and he was described as a gallant fighter.

Around the same time that Emperor Basil II captured the bulk of Samuel's army, Gavril and his forces defeated the army of Theophylact Botaneiates. Having inherited Samuel's war with the Byzantine Empire, Gavril Radomir raided Byzantine territory, reaching as far as Constantinople. However, the Byzantines secured the assistance of Ivan Vladislav, who owed his life to Radomir. Vladislav murdered Radomir while hunting near Ostrovo, and then took the throne for himself.

Some sources connect Gavril Radomir with the medieval dualist sect, Bogomilism, a popular heretic movement that flourished in the Bulgarian region of Kutmichevitsa during his and his father's reign. Gavril married twice. His possible son Peter Delyan played a role in attempting to secure independence for Bulgaria several decades later.

Ian Mladjov inferred that Agatha, the wife of Edward the Exile, was granddaughter of Agatha Cryselia, daughter of Gavril Radomir, by his short-lived first marriage to a Hungarian princess thought to have been the daughter of Duke Géza of Hungary. According to the Polish–Hungarian Chronicle, that princess was Adelaide, the daughter of Doubravka of Bohemia and Mieszko I of Poland.

== Family tree ==
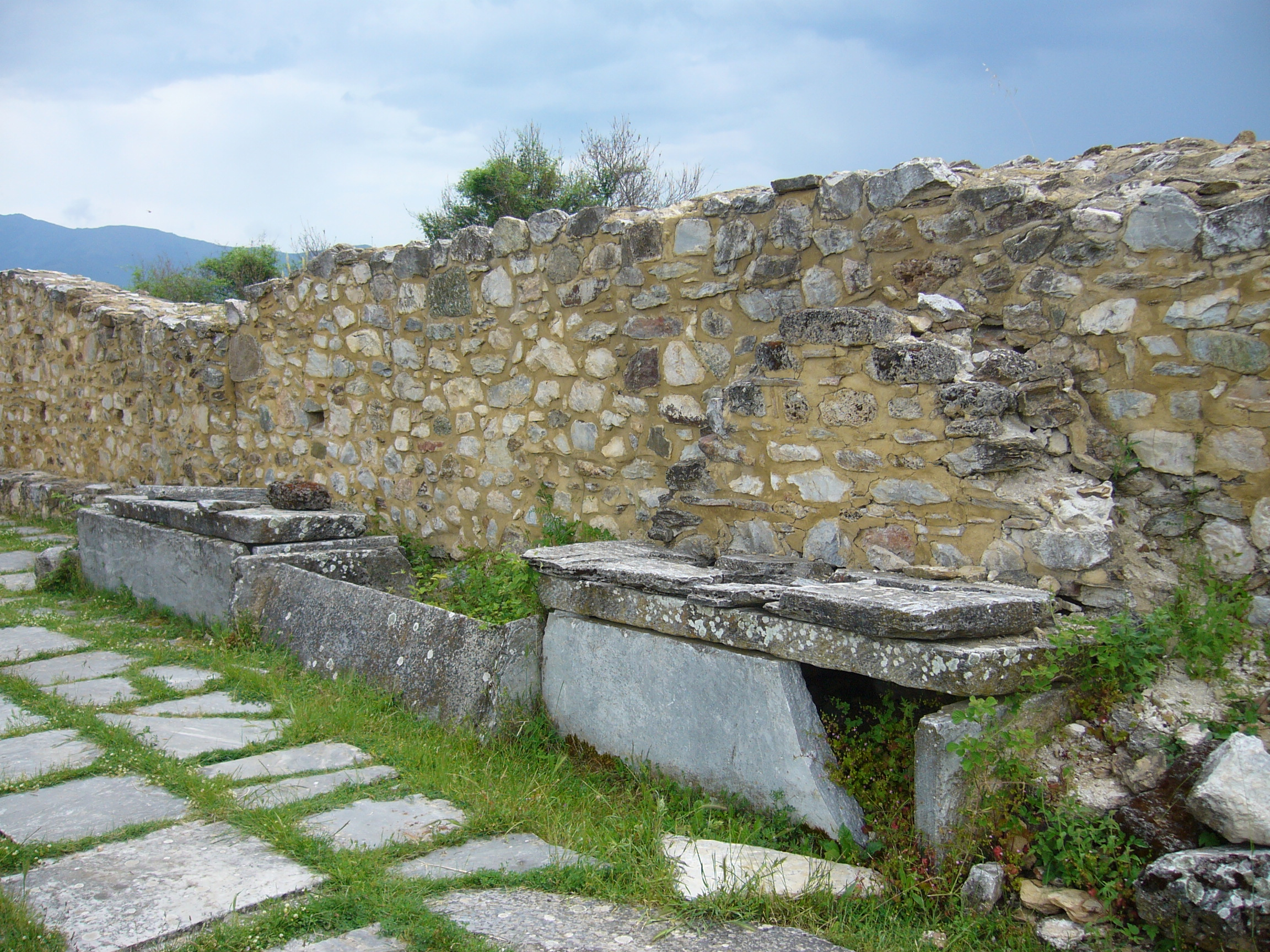
The sarcophagi of Samuel, Gavril Radomir and Ivan Vladislav in Agios Achilios island in Little Prespa lake.

Comita; Nikola	Ripsimia of Armenia
Aron	Moses	David	Samuel	Agatha
Ivan; Vladislav	Miroslava	Unknown daughter	Unknown daughter	Irene of Larissa	Gavril; Radomir	Margaret of Hungary
several sons & daughters	Peter Delyan?

== See also ==
- History of Bulgaria
- Cometopuli dynasty
- Bitola inscription

== Sources ==
- История на българската държава през средните векове, Том I. История на Първото българско царство. Част II. От славянизацията на държавата до падането на Първото царство (852—1018). Васил Н. Златарски 4.Приемниците на цар Самуил и покорението на България от Василий II Българоубиец.

== Footnotes ==
Preceded by Samuel of Bulgaria	Emperor of Bulgaria; 1014–1015	Succeeded by Ivan Vladislav
