= Administrative divisions of the Ottoman Empire =

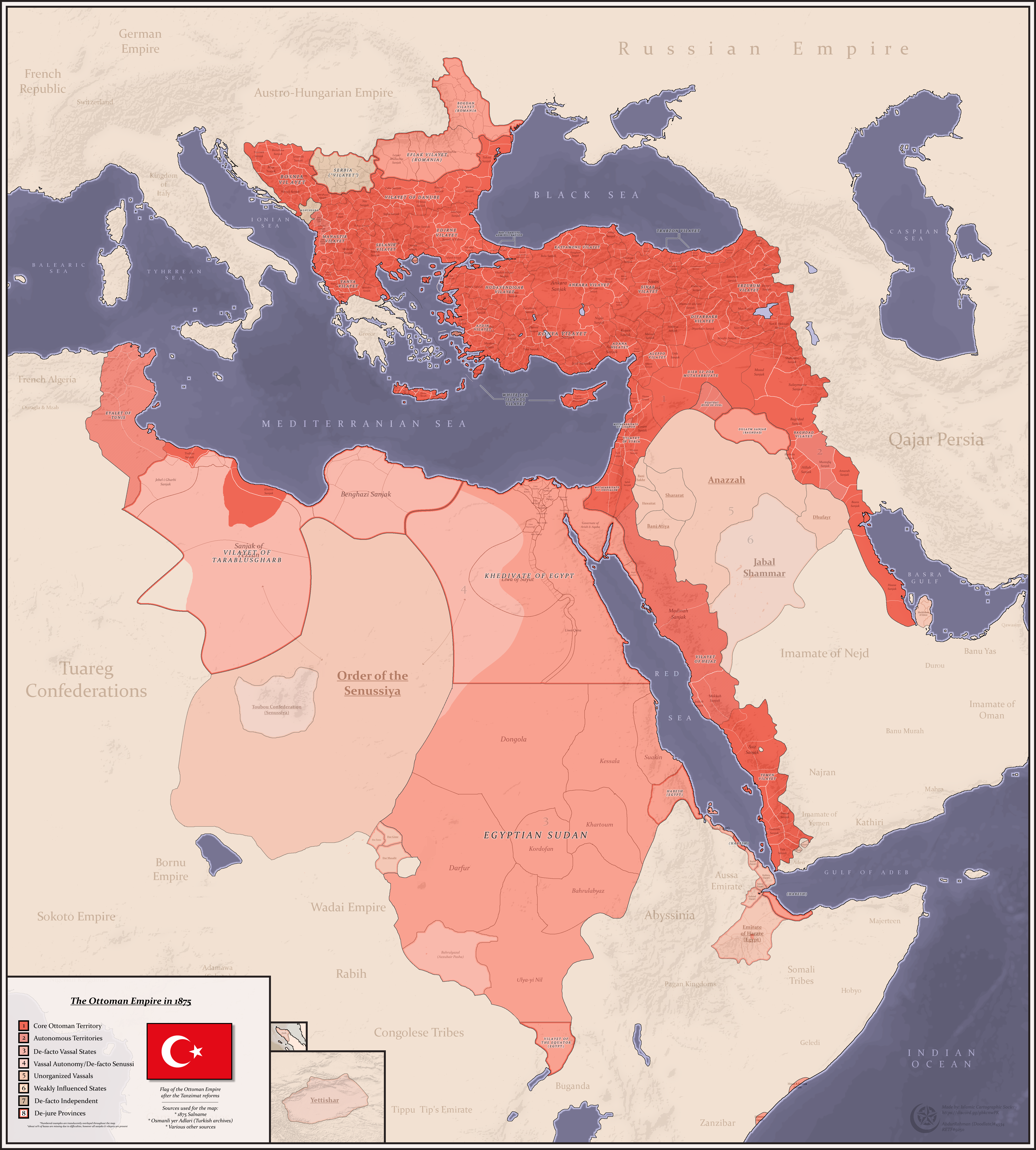
Vilayets and Sanjaks of the Ottoman Empire in 1875

The administrative divisions of the Ottoman Empire were administrative divisions of the state organisation of the Ottoman Empire. Outside this system were various types of vassal and tributary states.

The Ottoman Empire was first subdivided into provinces, in the sense of fixed territorial units with governors appointed by the sultan, in the late 14th century. The beylerbey, or governor, of each province was appointed by the central government. Sanjaks (banners) were governed by sanjak-beys, selected from the high military ranks by the central government. Beylerbeyis had authority over all the sancakbeyis in a region. Kaza was a subdivision of sancak and referred to the basic administrative district, governed by a kadi.

It is considered extremely difficult to define the number and exact borders of Ottoman provinces and domains, as their boundaries changed constantly. Until the Tanzimat period from 1839 to 1876, the borders of administrative units fluctuated, reflecting the changing strategies of the Ottomans, the emergence of new threats in the region, and the rise of powerful ayans. All the subdivisions were very unequal in terms of area and population, and the presence of numerous nomadic tribes contributed to the extreme variability of the population figures.

== Types ==
=== Main administrative units ===
Division	Level	Head	Notes
beylerbeylik, eyalet (province)	1st	beylerbey, vali	The beylerbeylik was renamed eyalet in 1590 and was replaced by vilayet with the Vilayet Law (1864–1867).
vilayet (province)	1st	vali	Term derived from Arabic wilāyah, established with the Vilayet Law (1864–1867), replaced the eyalets.
sanjak, liwa, mutasarrifate (region, provincial subdivision, county, banner)	2nd	sanjakbey, vizier, mutesarrif	Traditional subdivision of beylerbeylik/eyalet/vilayet, but in war-time and the last decades there were independent sanjaks.
kaza (district)	3rd	kadi (until 1839), kaymakam	Traditional subdivision of sanjak. Originally equivalent to judicial district known as kadiluk.
nahiye (subdistrict, commune)	4th	mütesellim (until 1842)	Term derived from Arabic nāḥiyah. Traditional subdivision of kaza.

Provinces (eyalets or sanjaks) under the administration of a pasha were also called "pashaliks". The judicial area of responsibility of the kadi were known as kadiluk.

=== Land tenure ===
Feudal land tenure lands (or fiefs) in the Timar-system were known as timar, ziamet, hass. Based on status of the land holder, the fiefs were also known as sipahilık ("of the sipahi"), agaluk (ağalık, "of the agha"), etc.

The yurtluk was a military district, known as ocaklik when becoming family property (hereditary), that the Ottoman Empire assigned to Kurdish beys.

== Initial organization (pre-1362) ==
The initial organization dates back to the Ottoman beginnings as a Seljuk vassal state (Uç Beyligi) in central Anatolia. The Ottoman Empire over the years became an amalgamation of pre-existing polities, the Anatolian beyliks, brought under the sway of the ruling House of Osman.

This extension was based on an already established administrative structure of the Seljuk system in which the hereditary rulers of these territories were known as beys. These beys (local leadership), which were not eliminated, continued to rule under the suzerainty of the Ottoman sultans. The term bey came to be applied not only to these former rulers but also to new governors appointed where the local leadership had been eliminated.

The Ottoman Empire was, at first, subdivided into the sovereign's sanjak and other sanjaks entrusted to the Ottoman sultan's sons. Sanjaks were governed by sanjakbeys, military governors who received a flag or standard – a "sanjak" (the literal meaning) – from the sultan.

As the Empire expanded into Europe, the need for an intermediate level of administration arose and, under the rule of Murad I (r. 1359–1389), a beylerbey ("bey of beys") or governor-general was appointed to oversee Rumelia, the European part of the empire. At the end of the 14th century, a beylerbeylik was also established for Anatolia, with his capital at Kütahya. He was always considered inferior in rank to the beylerbey of Rumelia, since large areas nominally under his control were given to the ruler's sons.

Following the establishment of beylerbeyliks, sanjaks became second-order administrative divisions, although they continued to be of the first order in certain circumstances such as newly conquered areas that had yet to be assigned a beylerbey. In addition to their duties as governors-general, beylerbeys were the commanders of all troops in their province.

Following the conquests between 1362 and 1400 of Murad I and his son Bayezid I, a need arose for the formal organisation of Ottoman territory.

== Administrative hierarchy ==
=== First-level divisions ===
There were two main eras of administrative organisation. The first was the initial organisation that evolved with the rise of the Empire and the second was the organisation after extensive administrative reforms of 1864.

==== Eyalets (1362–1864) ====
Eyalets in 1609

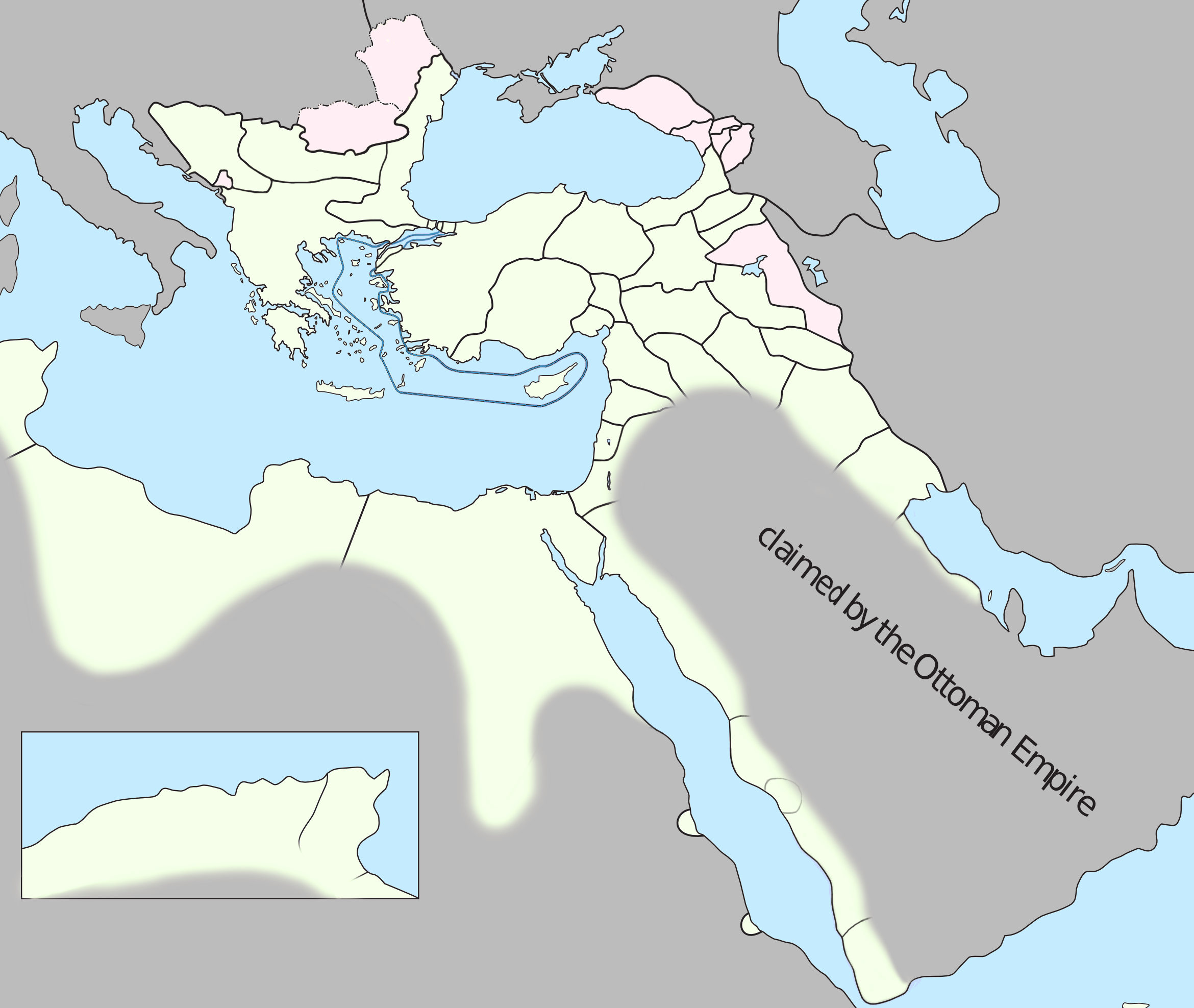
Eyalets in 1795

An eyalet (also pashalik or beylerbeylik) was the territory of office of a beylerbey, and was further subdivided in sanjaks. Toward the end of the 16th century, the beylerbeyliks began to be known as eyalets. The beylerbeyliks where the timar system was not applied, such as Habesh, Algers, Egypt, Baghdad, Basra and Lahsa, were more autonomous than the others. Instead of collecting provincial revenues through the timariot sipahis, the beylerbey transferred fixed annual sums to Istanbul, known as the salyane.

==== Vilayets (1864–1922) ====
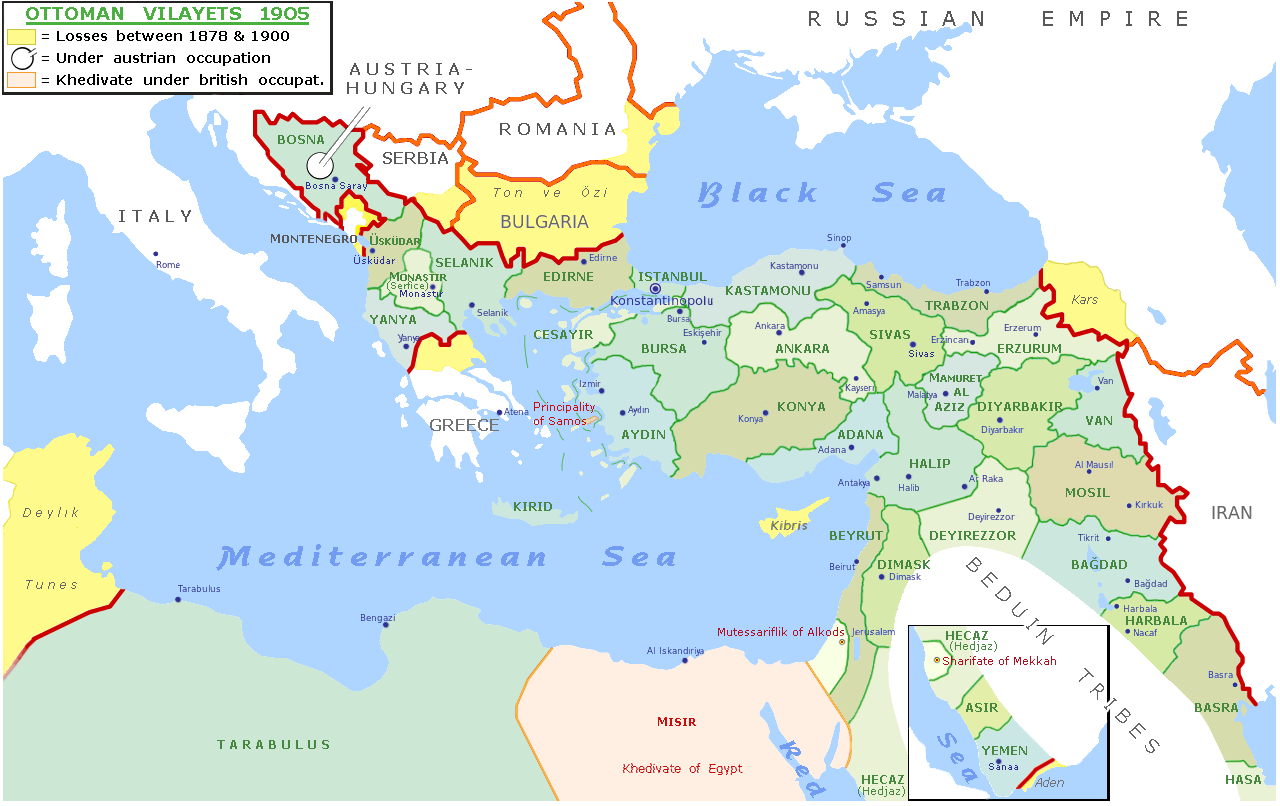
Vilayets in 1905

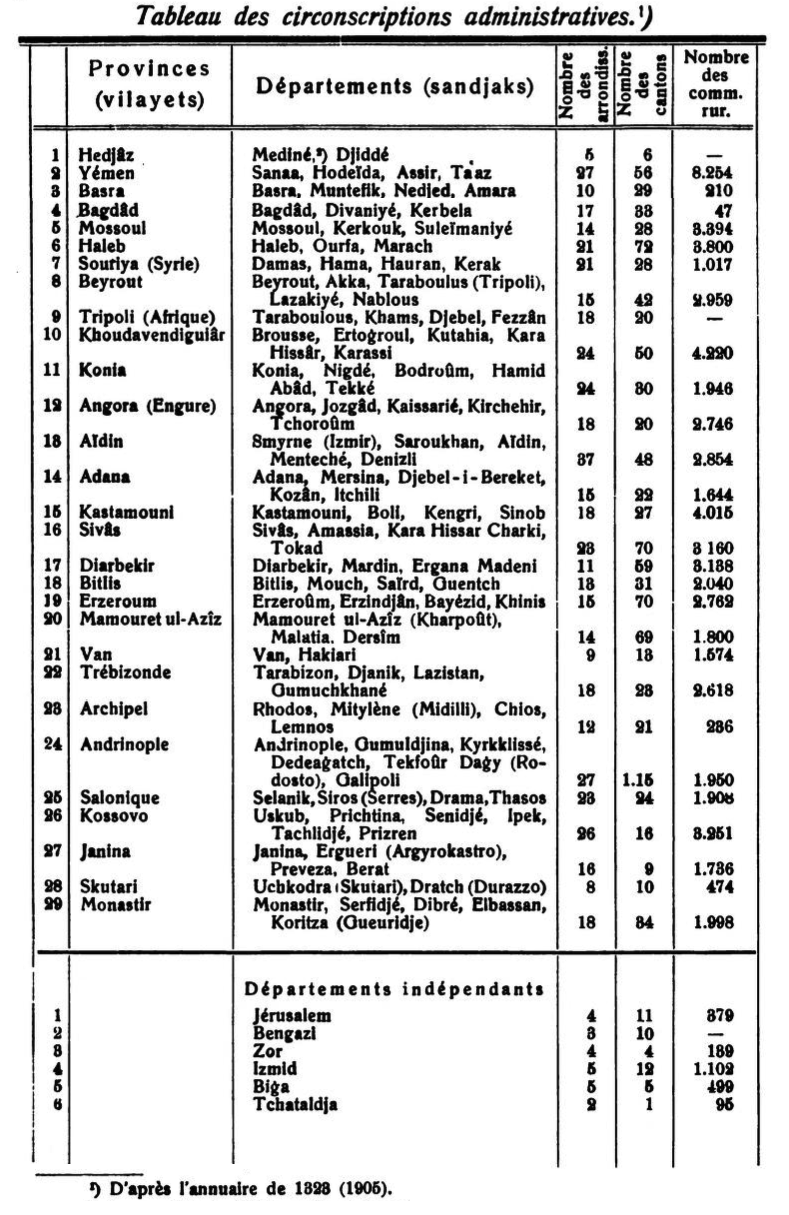
Table of Ottoman Administrative Divisions in 1905 (table published in 1908)

The Vilayets were introduced with the promulgation of the "Vilayet Law" (Turkish: Teskil-i Vilayet Nizamnamesi) in 1864, as part of the administrative reforms of the Tanzimat period that were being enacted throughout the empire.

Unlike the previous eyalet system, the 1864 law established a hierarchy of administrative units: the vilayet, liva/sanjak (cf. Liwa (Arabic)), kaza and village council, to which the 1871 Vilayet Law added the nahiye. The 1864 law also specified the responsibilities of the governor (wali) of the vilayet and their councils. At the same time, the law left to the governors vast scope for independent action as well as responsibility, as part of a system intended to achieve a large degree of efficiency in ruling the provinces.

The new provincial system could not be introduced in provinces at the same time, due to both insufficient funds and a lack of experience in administering the new law. Therefore, the new Danube Vilayet, composed of the former eyalets of Silistria, Vidin, and Nis, was selected to be the pilot project. Midhat Pasha and Cevdet Pasha were particularly successful in applying the new law in the Vilayets of Danube and Aleppo, respectively.

By 1865 the four vilayets of Danube, Aleppo, Erzurum and Bosnia were fully organized and in operation. Damascus, Tripolitania, and Edirne followed the next year. In 1867, 13 new vilayets were organized, including Bursa, Izmir, Trabzon, Salonica, Prizren, and Iskodra, with an autonomous Crete being organized as a vilayet by Ali Pasha in 1871. By the end of 1876 the new provincial system was in operation all over the empire, with the sole exception of the Arabian Peninsula and autonomous provinces like Egypt.

Mahmud Nedim Pasha reduced the size of some of the larger provinces, thus taking Sofia from the Danube Vilayet, Sebinkarahisar from Trabzon, and Maras from Adana and making them into separate provinces, and also taking Herzegovina from Bosnia and joining it with Novipazar in a new province.

=== Second-level divisions (sanjaks) ===
The provinces (eyalets, later vilayets) were divided into sanjaks (also called livas) governed by sanjakbeys (also called Mutesarrifs) and were further subdivided into timars (fiefs held by timariots), kadiluks (the area of responsibility of a judge, or Kadi) and zeamets (also ziam; larger timars).

=== Third-level divisions ===
Sanjaks were divided into kazas, along with other divisions. The position of kazas in the administrative hierarchy was clarified after 1839.

== Governors ==
=== Beylerbey ===
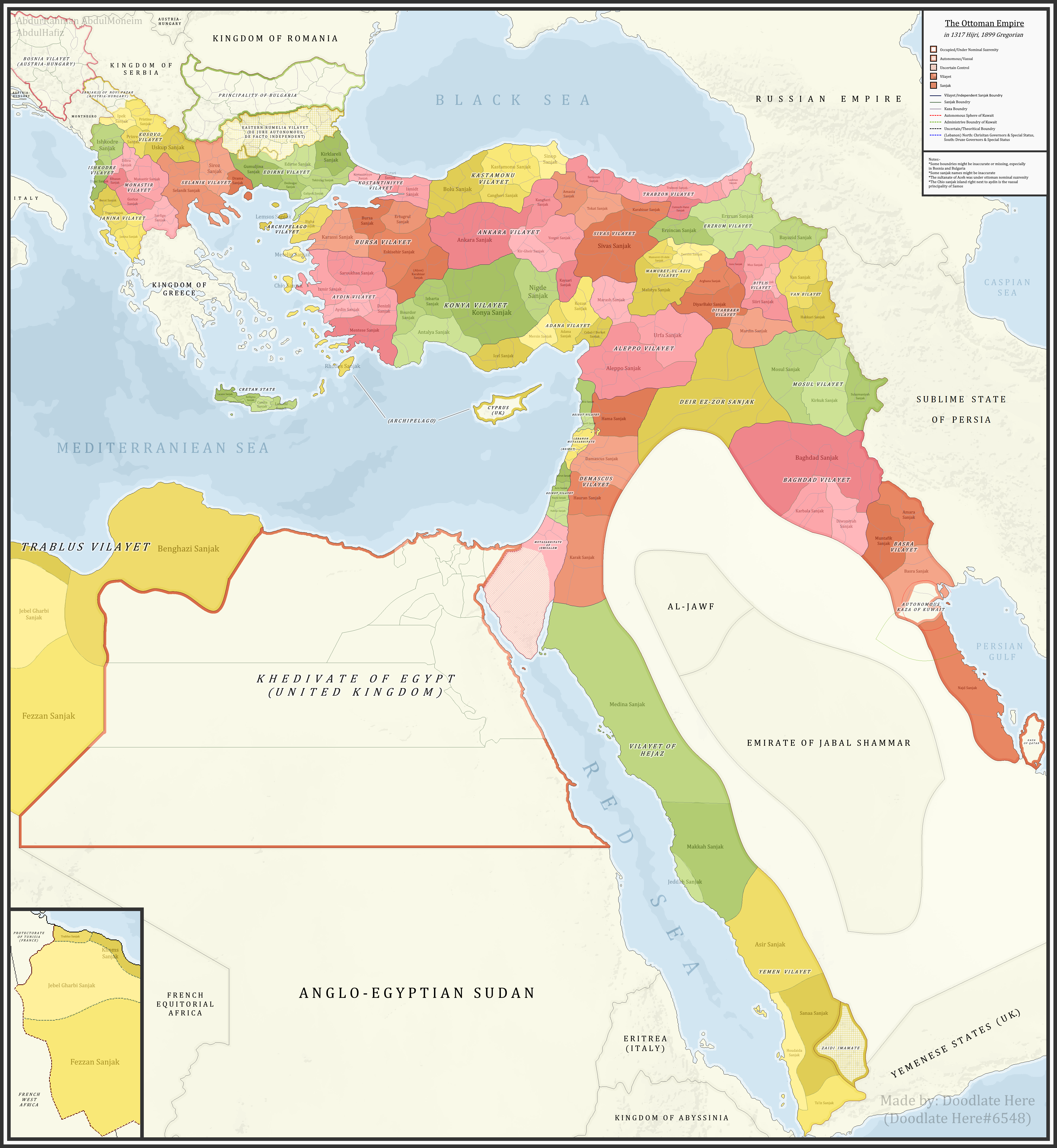
A detailed map showing the Ottoman Empire and its dependencies, including its administrative divisions (vilayets, sanjaks, kazas), in 1899.

The Turkish word for governor-general is Beylerbey, meaning 'lord of lords'. In times of war, they would assemble under his standard and fight as a unit in the sultan's army. However, as a territorial governor, the Beylerbey now had wider responsibilities. He played the major role in allocating fiefs in his eyalet, and had a responsibility for maintaining order and dispensing justice. His household, like the sultan's in the capital, was the political centre of the eyalet. By the mid-16th century, apart from the principalities north of the Danube, all eyalets came under the direct rule of the sultan. The Beylerbeys were all his appointees, and he could remove or transfer them at will. Their term of office was limited: governorships were not hereditary, and no one could serve for life.

The office of Beylerbey was the most prestigious and the most profitable in the provincial government, and it was from among the Beylerbeys that the sultan almost always chose his viziers. There was also, it appears, a hierarchy among the governors themselves. The senior was the Beylerbey of Rumelia who, from 1536, had the right to sit on the Imperial Council. Precedence among the remainder, according to Ayn Ali in 1609, followed the order in which the eyalets were conquered, although he does not make it clear whether this ranking had anything other than a ceremonial significance. However, before 1650, there was another development. During this period, the practice began of appointing some Beylerbeys with the rank of vizier. A vizieral governor, according to the chancellor Abdurrahman Pasha in 1676, had command over the governors of adjoining eyalets who 'should have recourse to him and obey his command'. Furthermore, 'when Beylerbeys with Vizierates are dismissed from their eyalet, they listen to lawsuits and continue to exercise Vizieral command until they reach Istanbul'.

=== Sanjak-bey ===
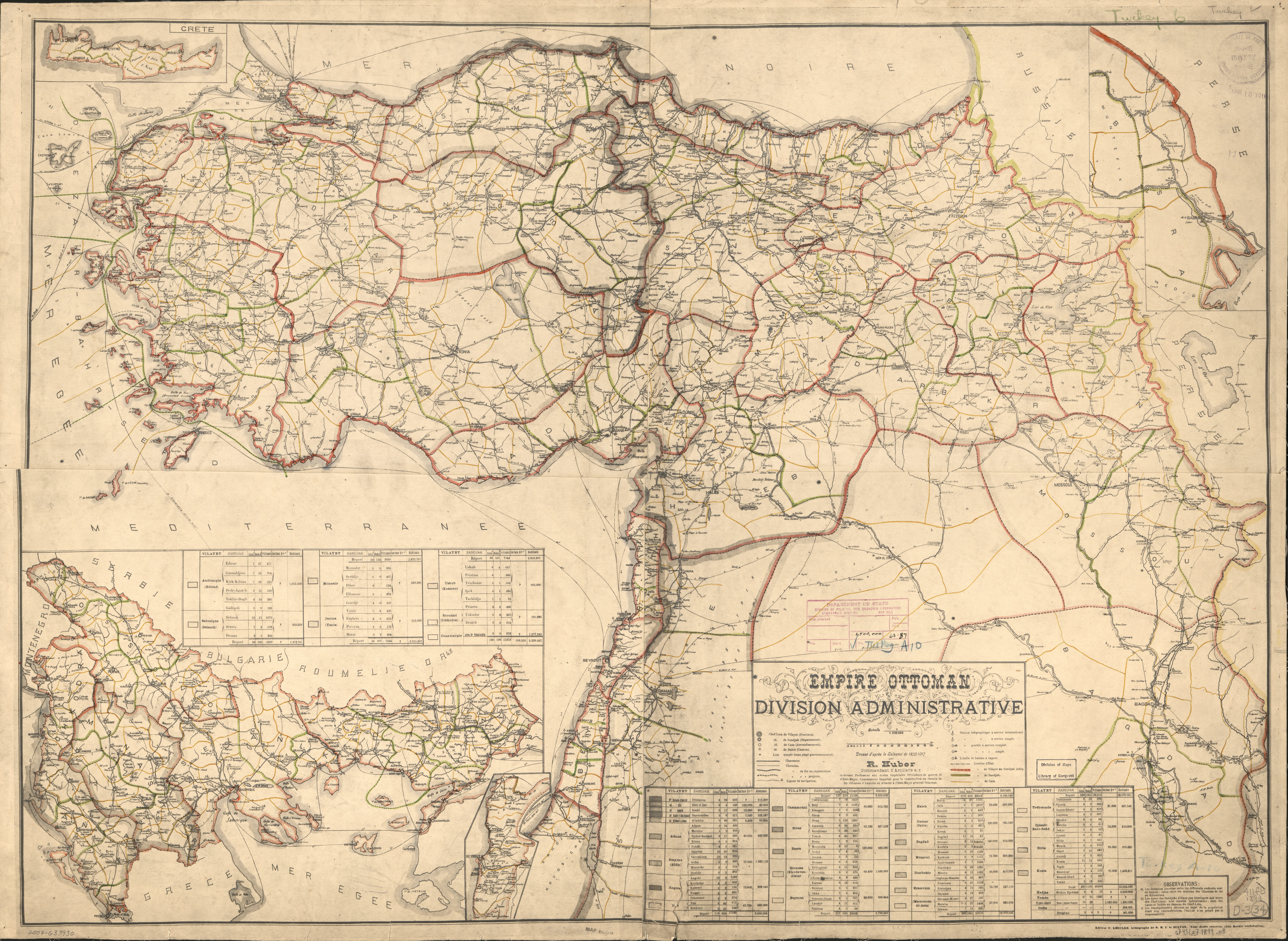
Major R Huber's 1899 map of the Ottoman Empire, showing detailed subdivisions (vilayets, sanjaks and kazas)

The office of Sanjak-bey resembled that of Beylerbey on a more modest scale. Like the Beylerbey, the Sanjak-bey drew his income from a prebend, which consisted usually of revenues from the towns, quays and ports within the boundary of his sanjak.

Like the Beylerbey, the Sanjak-bey was also a military commander. The term sanjak means 'flag' or 'standard' and, in times of war, the cavalrymen holding fiefs in his sanjak, gathered under his banner. The troops of each sanjak, under the command of their governor, would then assemble as an army and fight under the banner of the Beylerbey of the eyalet. In this way, the structure of command on the battlefield resembled the hierarchy of provincial government. Within his own sanjak, a governor was responsible above all for maintaining order and, with the cooperation of the fief holders, arresting and punishing wrongdoers. For this, he usually received half of the fines imposed on miscreants, with the fief holder on whose lands the misdeed took place, receiving the other half. Sanjak governors also had other duties, for example, the pursuit of bandits, the investigation of heretics, the provision of supplies for the army, or the despatch of materials for shipbuilding, as the sultan commanded.

Sanjak governors also served as military commanders of all of the timariot and zeamet-holding cavalrymen in their sanjak. Some provinces such as Egypt, Baghdad, Abyssinia, and Al-Hasa (the salyane provinces) were not subdivided into sanjaks and timars. The area governed by an Aga was often known as an Agaluk. The term Arpalik (Turkish: Arpalik), or Arpaluk, refers to large estate (i.e. sanjak) entrusted to some holder of senior position, or to some margrave, as temporary arrangement before they were appointed to some appropriate position. The barleycorn was known as arpa in Turkish, and the feudal system in Ottoman Empire employed the term Arpalik, or "barley-money", to refer to a second allowance made to officials to offset the costs of fodder for their horses (for covering the expenses of keeping a small unit of cavalry).

== See also ==
- Administrative divisions of Turkey
- Vassal and tributary states of the Ottoman Empire
