= Chiflik =

Turkish term for a system of land management in the Ottoman Empire

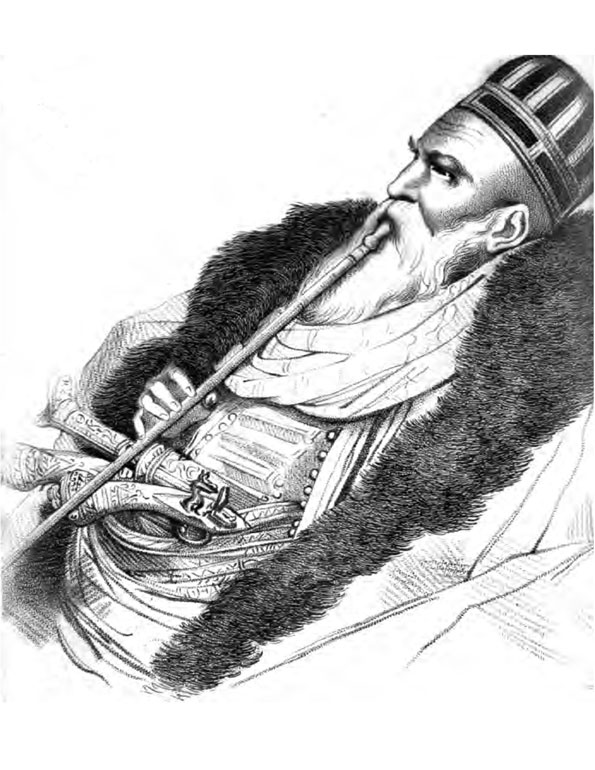
Ali Pasha of Ioannina, one of the more powerful Chiflik rulers

The chiflik or chiftlik (Ottoman Turkish: çiftlik; Albanian: çiflig; Bulgarian: чифлик, chiflik; Macedonian: чифлиг, čiflig; Greek: τσιφλίκι, tsiflíki; Serbian: читлук/čitluk) is a Turkish term for a system of land management in the Ottoman Empire. Before the chiflik system, the Empire used a non-hereditary form of land management called the timar system. As the Empire began to collapse, powerful military officers started to claim land from the sultan's holding, allowing them to pass the land to their sons, thus creating the chiflik system. This form of land management lasted from the 16th century until the collapse of the Ottoman Empire in 1919. The chiflik owners were known as chiftlik-sahibi.

== Background ==
Before the chiflik system was adopted, the timar system was the official land management system of the Ottoman Empire. The system was one in which the projected revenue of a conquered territory was distributed in the form of temporary land grants among the Sipahis (cavalrymen) and other members of the military class including Janissaries and other servants of the Sultan. These land grants were given as compensation for annual military service, for which they received no pay. Timars could be small, granted by governors, or large which required a certificate from the Sultan but generally the fief had an annual value of less than twenty thousand akçes. Although the military officers were granted land, they did not have title to it, this being retained by the Sultan. If the military member died or left the land, it reverted to the Sultan to be distributed to a new person. Under this system the temporary owners could demand about three days' labour per year from the peasants living on their land. This is compared to two or three days a week under the Christian feudal system.

This system of land tenure lasted roughly from the fourteenth century through to the sixteenth century. As late as 1528 as much as 87% of the land was officially the Sultan's land, the rest belonging to religious organizations. The goals of the system were necessitated by financial, state and expansionist purposes. The financial aims of the system were to relieve pressure from the Ottoman state of paying the army as well as to gain a new source of revenue for the central treasury. However, the system only worked while new land was being won by advancing Ottoman armies. When the Ottoman advance was halted in Europe and the Empire began to contract, the Timar system began to collapse.

== Adoption ==
With no new land to be divided up, the more powerful military commanders began to turn on the Ottoman Empire and its head of state, the Sultan. Instead of focusing on conquering outside forces these military officials started to carve up the Empire into private land holdings that the then weakened Ottoman Empire was forced to recognize. These new land holdings could be passed on to their sons. Most of the chiflik rulers only controlled small land holdings but some like Ali Pasha of Ioannina ruled autonomous kingdoms inside the Empire.

== Result ==
Previously, peasants that were taxed under the Timar system enjoyed a relatively liberal system. Under the Chiflik system, they were ruled as serfs. No longer free to work for their own monetary gain, they now had to labour under the rule of a feudal lord many days a week plus a larger percent of their harvest was seized. This increased oppression often led to peasants migrating to areas away from Chiflik control, or to the mountains where Ottoman authority didn't exist. The new oppressive system also increased peasant support for nationalist uprising against Ottoman rule in such places as the Balkans and Greece.

The Chiflik system began to wane in the 1910s as Balkan territories gained independence. In Macedonia, peasants seized control of Chiflik lands and began exporting tobacco through Greece. After the disintegration of the Ottoman Empire the transition from the Chiflik to others agricultural systems led to events like the Kileler incident.

== The town of Al-Jiftlik ==
The name of the Palestinian town Al-Jiftlik on the West Bank is derived from the above system of land tenure, which was applied there as in many other Ottoman locations.

== See also ==
- Ottoman law & land administration
  - Düstur, code of law
  - Defter, land and tax registry
  - Tanzimat, 19th-century reform movement
  - Land ownership systems
    - Timar feudal system
    - Ottoman Land Code of 1858
  - Foreign purchases of real estate in Turkey
- Ottoman sultans
  - Bayezid I (c. 1360-1403)
  - Mehmed II (1432-1481)
- Pasha, high Ottoman rank, usually given to governors
- Agha (Ottoman Empire), or lord
  - Agaluk, feudal unit governed by an Agha
- Ottoman military corps, part of feudal system
  - Janissaries
  - Sipahis
  - Timariot, Sipahi cavalryman, beneficiary of a timar fief
- Byzantine administrative system
  - Dynatoi, senior officialdom
  - Pronoia, system of granting state income to individuals and institutions
  - Strateia, enrollment into state or ecclesiastical service, often relating to military
- Israeli land and property laws
  - Torrens title in Israel
- Fiefdom
- Land reform

== Bibliography ==
- Bideleux, Robert; Jeffries, Ian (1998). A history of eastern Europe: crisis and change (when ed.). Routledge. ISBN 0-415-16111-8. - Total pages: 685
- Jusdanis, Gregory (1991). Belated modernity and aesthetic culture: inventing national literature (1991 ed.). University of Minnesota Press. ISBN 0-8166-1980-8. - Total pages: 207
- Lampe, John R.; Jackson, Marvin R. (1982). Balkan economic history, 1550-1950: from imperial borderlands to developing nations (when ed.). Indiana University Press. ISBN 0-253-30368-0. - Total pages: 728
- Özel, Oktay (1999). "Limits of the Almighty: Mehmed II's 'Land Reform' Revisited". Journal of the Economic and Social History of the Orient. 42 (2). Brill: 226–246. doi:10.1163/1568520991446848. hdl:11693/48561.
- Wagstaff, J. M. (1978). "War and Settlement Desertion in the Morea, 1685-1830". Transactions of the Institute of British Geographers. 3 (3): 295–308. doi:10.2307/622158. ISSN 0020-2754. JSTOR 622158.
- Fotić, Aleksandar (2021). "How to Run a Big Monastic Çiftlik: The Case of Hilandar's ʻBulgar Metochionʼ in Karviya (Kalamaria): Sixteenth-Seventeenth Centuries". Monastic Economy across Time: Wealth Management, Patterns, and Trends. Sofia: Centre for Advanced Study. pp. 83–97.
