= Rayah =

Name given to common people by Ottomans

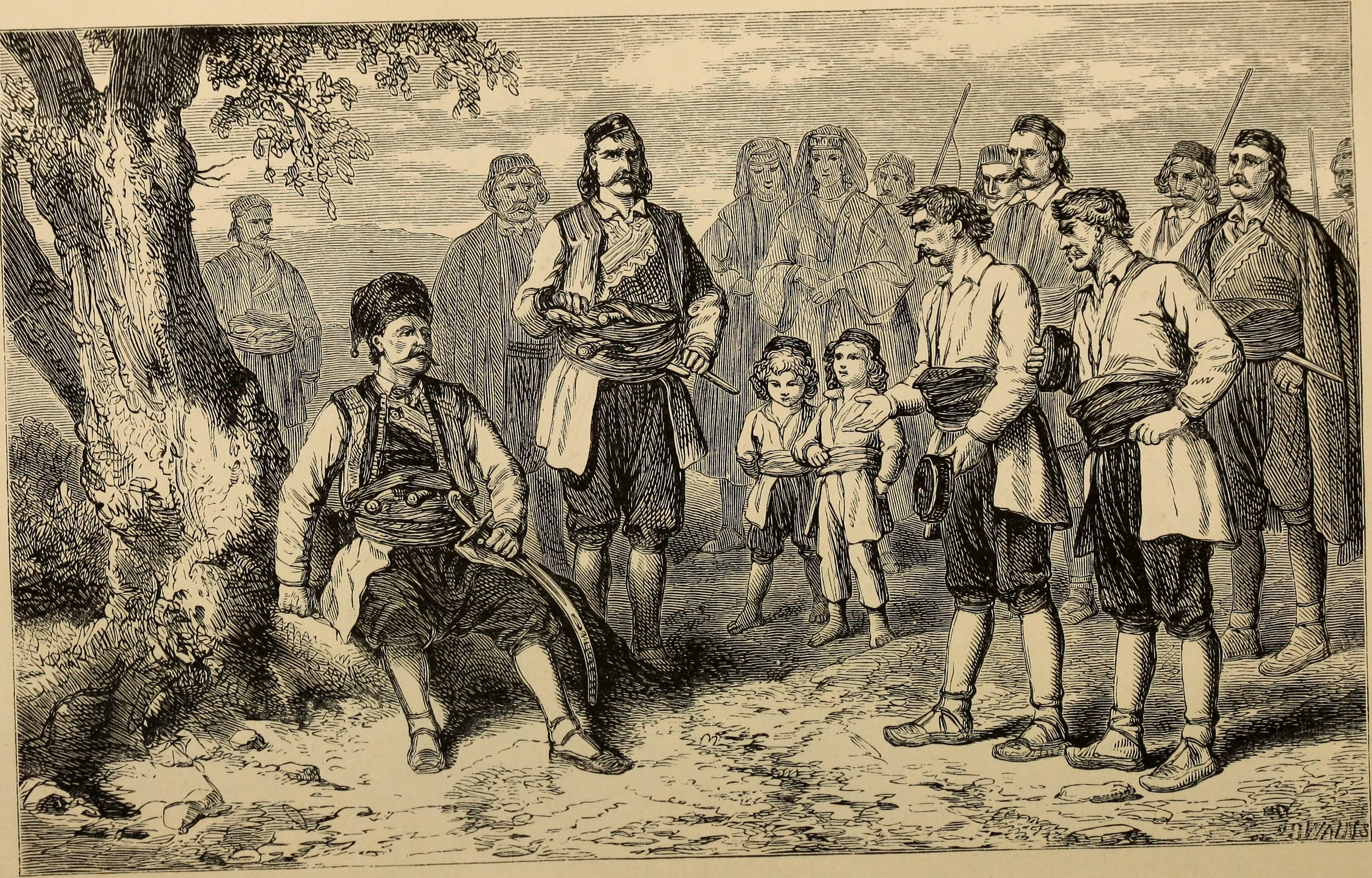
Serb rayah discussing with an Ayan.

The rayah or reaya was a member of the tax-paying lower class of Ottoman society, in contrast to the askeri (military) and kul (slaves, including Janissaries). Ottoman subjects were initially divided into roughly two taxable classes, the military class (askeri) and working class (rayah). The term was attributed to the peasant tax-paying subjects of the Timariots, active until the disintegration of the timar system in the 16th century. A clear social distinction was made between the Muslim and Christian rayah, with legal and religious discrimination against the latter, viewed of as infidels (giaour). Although the term initially and generally was used to encompass all of the subject lower class (taxed Muslims, Christians and Jews), it was particularly attributed to the Christian (also called zimmi), mostly Eastern Orthodox communities (the Rum Millet) in Southeastern Europe (Rumelia).

== History ==
The rayah were the peasant tax-paying subjects of the Timariots, active until the disintegration of the timar system in the 16th century. The Timariot made sure that the peasants preserved their status, and although a peasant could reach a public function, it would not change his status. There was an Ottoman principle saying "the son of a rayah is a rayah". After the mid-15th century, members of the sipahi and devshirme managed to enter the elite as advisors or viziers, while the chances of the rayah diminished. Lütfi Pasha, the Grand Vizier (1539–41), described the specific classification of the rayah as tax-paying subjects, and explained that if a member managed to become a Timariot through distinction he should not engage in nepotism, while if becoming a scholar, his children would remain rayah. At first, rayah were ineligible for military service, but this changed for the Muslims in the late 16th century, to the dismay of some of the elite.

The chiflik system replaced that of the timar.

By the end of the 18th century, while the term theoretically applied to the tax-paying subjects, it had become synonymous with "Christians".

== Taxation ==
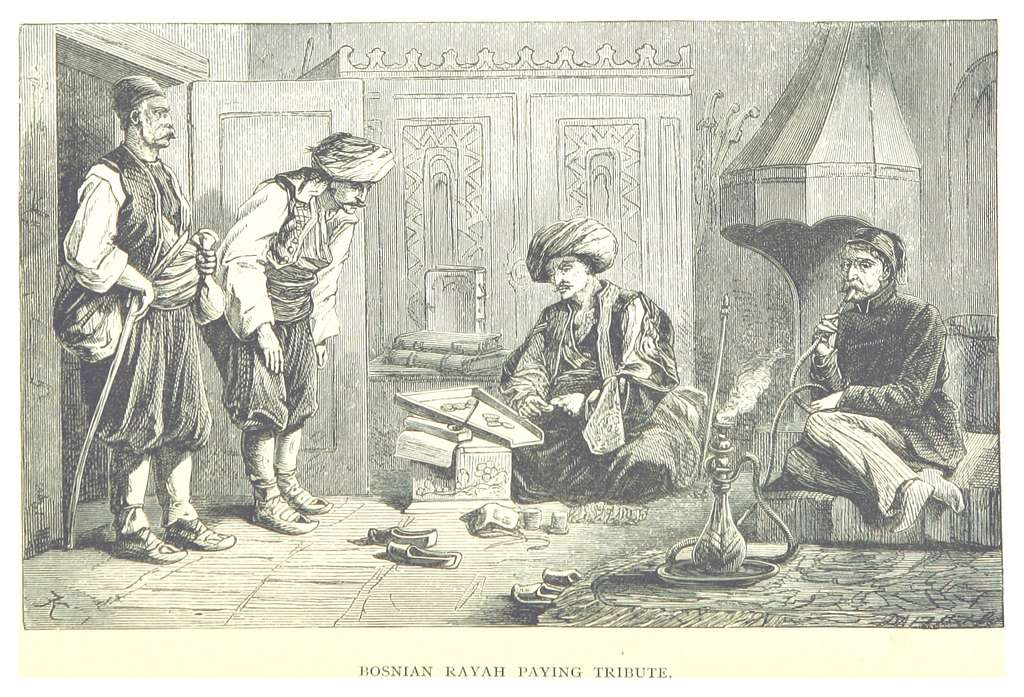
Bosnian rayah paying tribute.

The Christian rayah paid the specific haraç, a land tax on non-Muslims, and cizye, a poll tax on non-Muslims. The Muslims paid the zakat, the counterpart of haraç.

Through paying the haraç, Christians were exempted from military service.

== See also ==
- Ryot, similar system in Mughal India
- Ottoman millet system

== Annotations ==
1. The word rayah or reaya (Ottoman Turkish: رعايا, romanized: re'āyā) in its most general meaning denoted all people except the ruling dynasty, according to the Turkish translation of Nahj al-Suluk (of al-Shayzari). The more specific meanings denote the tax-paying subjects, as evident from siyasetname and layiha, or peasants in general. It derives from Arabic: raʿāyā (رعايا, plural of raʿiya رعيّة) meaning flock, subjects.

== Sources ==
- Ermiş, F. (2013). "A discussion of the concepts and terminology". A History of Ottoman Economic Thought: Developments Before the Nineteenth Century. The Routledge History of Economic Thought. Taylor & Francis. pp. 37–38. ISBN 978-1-134-68224-9.
- Greene, Molly (2000). A Shared World: Christians and Muslims in the Early Modern Mediterranean. Princeton. ISBN 0-691-00898-1.
- Hajdarpasic, Edin (2020). "Frontier Anxieties: Toward a Social History of Muslim-Christian Relations on the Ottoman-Habsburg Border". Austrian History Yearbook. 51: 25–38.
- Isom-Verhaaren, C.; Schull, K. F. (2016). Living in the Ottoman Realm: Empire and Identity, 13th to 20th Centuries. Indiana University Press. ISBN 978-0-253-01948-6.
- Karpat, Kemal H. (2002). Studies on Ottoman Social and Political History: Selected Articles and Essays. BRILL. ISBN 978-90-04-12101-0.
- Pizanias, P. T. (2020). The Making of the Modern Greeks: 1400-1820. Cambridge Scholars Publishing. ISBN 978-1-5275-6248-6.
- Sugar, Peter F. (1983). "Southeastern Europe under Ottoman Rule, 1354-1804". A History of East Central Europe. Vol. V. University of Washington Press. ISBN 0-295-96033-7.
- Vucinich, Wayne S. (1979). The Ottoman Empire, Its Record and Legacy. The Anvil series 0570-1062. R. E. Krieger Publishing Company. ISBN 978-0-88275-785-8.
