= Kadiluk =

Ottoman judicial district

A kadiluk (Ottoman Turkish: قاضیـلق, kadıluk, Turkish: kadılık) was the jurisdiction of a kadi, an Islamic judge under the Ottoman Empire. They typically consisted of a major city and its surrounding villages, although some kadis occupied other positions within the imperial administration.

== Legal issues ==
Kadis oversaw administration of imperial justice, which was particularly important for maintaining order and local control over the sipahis granted fiefs (timar) during the early Ottoman expansion.

== Kazas ==
Within the imperial administration, kadiluks also initially functioned as the kazas, the main subdivisions of the sanjaks, with the kadi overseeing his district's taxation and military conscription. These functions were eventually handed over to a separate official called the kaymakam, and the empire's kazas were fully distinguished from its kadiluks in 1864 as part of the Tanzimat reforms.

== See also ==
- Subdivisions of the Ottoman Empire
- Sanjak
- Agaluk
- Qadaa
- Qadiyat
