= Aleppo Eyalet =

Administrative division of the Ottoman Empire from 1534 to 1864

Arabic: إيالة حلب Ottoman Turkish: ایالت حلب
- Eyalet of the Ottoman Empire
- 1534–1864
- Flag

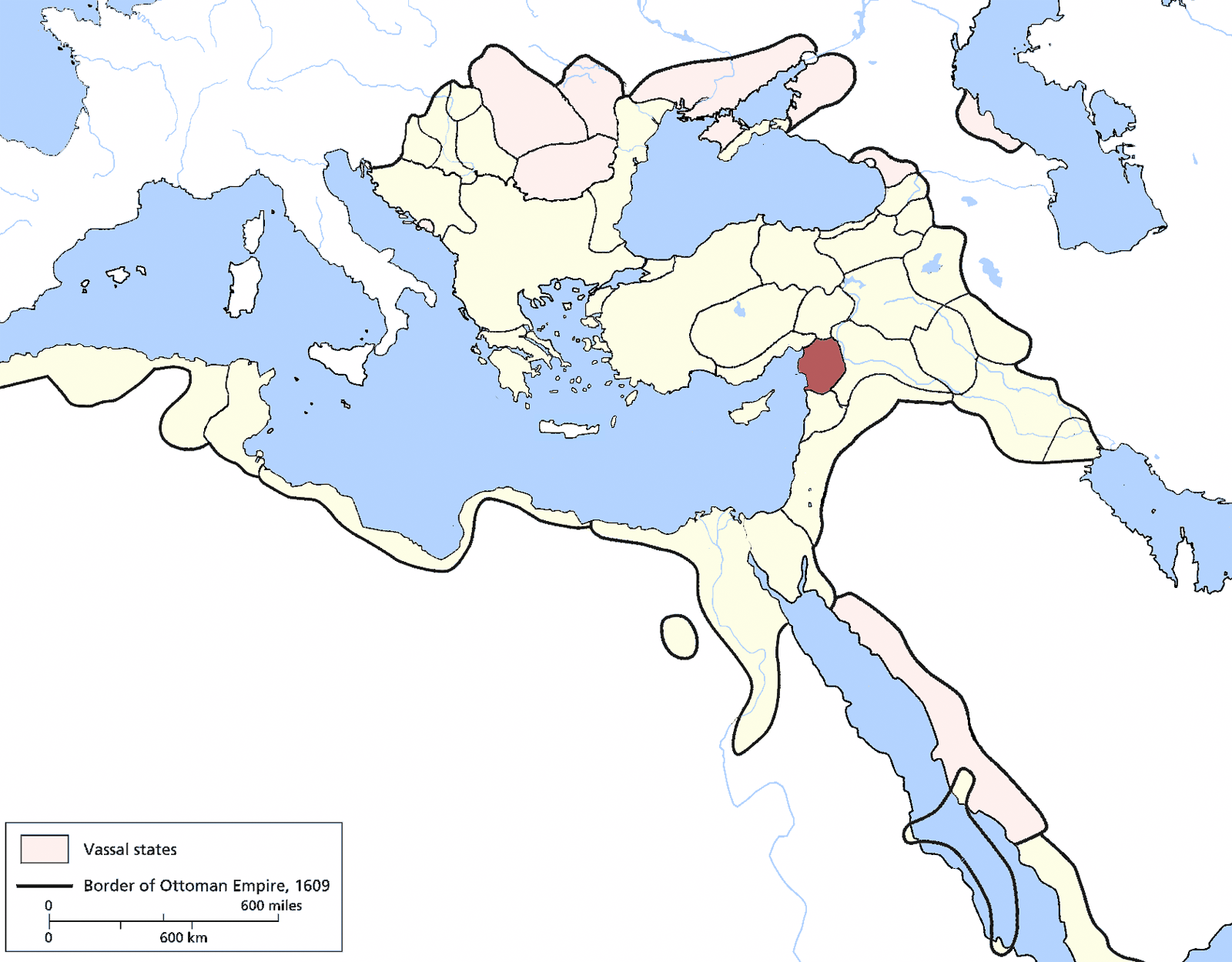
- The Aleppo Eyalet in 1609
- Capital: Aleppo
- Area
  - Coordinates: 36.29°N 36.55°E
- History
  - Established: 1534
  - Disestablished: 1864
Preceded by	Succeeded by
Damascus Eyalet	Adana Eyalet; Aleppo Vilayet
- Today part of: Syria; Turkey

Aleppo Eyalet (Arabic: إيالة حلب; Ottoman Turkish: ایالت حلب, romanized: Eyālet-i Ḥaleb) was an eyalet of the Ottoman Empire. After the Ottoman conquest it was governed from Damascus, but by 1534 Aleppo was made the capital of a new eyalet. Its reported area in the 19th century was 8,451 square miles (21,890 km^{2}). Its capital, Aleppo, was the third largest city of the Ottoman Empire during the 16th and 17th century.

== History ==
Thanks to its strategic geographic location on the trade route between Anatolia and the east, Aleppo rose to high prominence in the Ottoman era, at one point being second only to Constantinople in the empire. By the middle of the 16th century, Aleppo had displaced Damascus as the principal market for goods coming to the Mediterranean region from the east. This is reflected by the fact that the Levant Company of London, a joint-trading company founded in 1581 to monopolize England's trade with the Ottoman Empire, never attempted to settle a factor, or agent, in Damascus, despite having had permission to do so. Aleppo served as the company's headquarters until the late 18th century.

As a result of the economic development, many European states had opened consulates in Aleppo during the 16th and the 17th centuries, such as the consulate of the Republic of Venice in 1548, the consulate of France in 1562, the consulate of England in 1583 and the consulate of the Netherlands in 1613. The desert hinterland and trade routes of Aleppo in this period were dominated by bedouin emirs of the Abu Rish and al-'Abbas families, who were officially appointed "desert emirs" (çöl beyi) by the Ottoman state.

However, the prosperity Aleppo experienced in the 16th and 17th century started to fade as silk production in Iran went into decline with the fall of the Safavid dynasty in 1722. By mid-century, caravans were no longer bringing silk from Iran to Aleppo, and local Syrian production was insufficient for Europe's demand. European merchants left Aleppo and the city went into an economic decline that was not reversed until the mid-19th century when locally produced cotton and tobacco became the principal commodities of interest to the Europeans.

The economy of Aleppo was badly hit by the opening of the Suez Canal in 1869. This, in addition to political instability that followed the implementation of significant reforms in 1841 by the central government, contributed to Aleppo's decline and the rise of Damascus as a serious economic and political competitor with Aleppo.

== Fiscal administration ==
Beginning in the 16th century, officials in Aleppo coordinated large municipal surveys that mapped the population and grouped them into administrative divisions for centralized regulation. The modernization of warfare during the second half of the century however encouraged changes in municipal administration, and the centralized system was replaced with a set of decentralized guidelines that allowed urban populations to determine their own policies. This did not change the original levels of taxation or military occupation in the cities.

The surveys were conducted with the help of civilian locals familiar with the administrative quarters. These locals were exempt from extraordinary taxes because of their service in helping put together the survey. Their duties were likely to assist the surveying teams travel and find accommodations throughout the city, however they were also able to contribute their understandings of where pockets of wealth and poverty existed, and report any information they had about local society and administrative practices. As an example, one group included "a preacher, Sufi shaykh, merchant, cavalryman, and officer attached to the provincial council". These gestures demonstrated that the surveyors were interested in a holistic understanding of the city, and assured the local population that they were receiving information from a variety of sources.

A basic unit of the survey was the beyt, which corresponds to the Arabic dar, and is about a single courtyard house. A second unit that was larger was the kaysariyye, or the kaysarhk, a courtyard structure with various chambers that consisted not only of smaller commercial buildings, but also caravanserais in the central market area. These buildings often housed a variety of different city residents, who all paid the owner some form of rent to reside there.

The avarız tax, or extraordinary tax, was collected from the residents of Aleppo from 1640 to 1700. The state required residents to pay the tax to meet unpredictable expenses that often came during times of war until the Tanzimat reforms of the 19th century. Examples of these expenses were the transportation costs of moving goods to military strongholds or fees to enlist specialized corps to assist the army. It was collected from both city residents as well as farmers who lived on the outskirts of municipal boundaries, though it fell largely on the shoulders of city residents. The tax was not designed to replace any tax mechanism that existed beforehand, but rather to supplement the tax structure in its entirety.

The avarız tax was determined and collected using a fiscal unit called avarizhane. An avarizhane indicated the ability of a number of households to pay a specific amount to tax collectors. This differed from the early Ottoman tapu system, in that the avarizhane system determined the ability of multiple households to pay, rather than only a single household. One reason why this system was used instead of the traditional tapu system, was that hanes were no longer owned by individual family units. Instead, a single hane could be occupied by a number of distinct households of varying means. Quarter officials responsible for what would have been considered a single hane, under the new system could re-negotiate taxes based on the general financial stability or redistribute taxes based on a family's financial success.

Tax collection was also determined by the status of the land and the identity of the land owner. If the land owner was a member of the reaya class, he was expected to pay taxes. However, if the owner was a member of the askeri, then he was exempt from doing so. If the land in question was not included in an early administrative survey, which took place in 1616, it was considered haric, or too old to be taxed. If record of it existed before that time, it was considered kadim, universally taxable regardless of the status of the person who owned it. After these steps, land was further categorized into relative affluence on the administrative survey. These policies heavily influenced the way that taxes were disputed in court; parties would not debate the tax status of an individual, but rather the status of the land, and they would not debate over the current owner of the land, but of the owner at the time of the survey. Residents often won arguments over the taxable status of their property by demonstrating a chain of ownership that predated the register, demonstrating that the status of the land was askeri. Another method that residents could obtain tax exemptions through was to petition the central fiscal body for exemption. This would convert land once considered kadim, to become haric upon decree. Government officials recognized the implications of this, and attempted to restrict the number of these available by application.

While the inherent qualities of haric were highly desirable in Aleppo, members of the askeri class did not have exclusive access to them because of their class. They still had to compete with other buyers to obtain them, though they enjoyed rights that members of the reaya did not. An example of one is that members of the askeri were asked before any one of the reaya if they wanted to purchase land that had just entered the market. This system of conferring specific rights to distinct social classes resembled another administrative system, gedik. Professional businesses, largely guilds or trade organizations, conferred rights onto people considered to be a member of that industrial group. These rights were used to preserve economic monopolies for guild members, because members with gidek rights had access to shops and markets that the rest of the population did not have access to.

== Administrative divisions ==
The eyalet consisted of the following sanjaks in the 17th century:

1. Kilis Sanjak (Akrád Kilís, Kilis)
2. Birecik Sanjak (Bírejek, Birecik)
3. Ma'arrah Sanjak (Maura, Ma`arrat an-Nu`man)
4. Uzeyr Sanjak (Azir, Payas)
5. Balis Sanjak (Bális, Balis)
6. Antakya Sanjak (Antakia (Antioch), Antakya)
- Two of the Sanjaks received an stipend, and had no ziamet nor timar
1. Masyaf Sanjak (Massiaf, Masyaf)
2. Sanjak of the Turkmens (in Azaz) (Sanjak of the Turkomans, Turkomans of Aleppo (Azaz))

The Eyalet consisted of five sanjaks between 1690 and 1740 as follows:

1. Aleppo Sanjak (Haleb Sancağı, Aleppo)
2. Ma'arrah Sanjak (Mameratülnuman Sancağı, Ma`arrat an-Nu`man)
3. Balis Sanjak (Bâliz Sansağı, Balis)
4. Uzeyr Sanjak (Uzeyr Sancağı, Payas)
5. Kilis Sanjak, also called district of Kurds (Kilis Sancağı Ekrad Sancağı, Kilis)

== Gallery ==
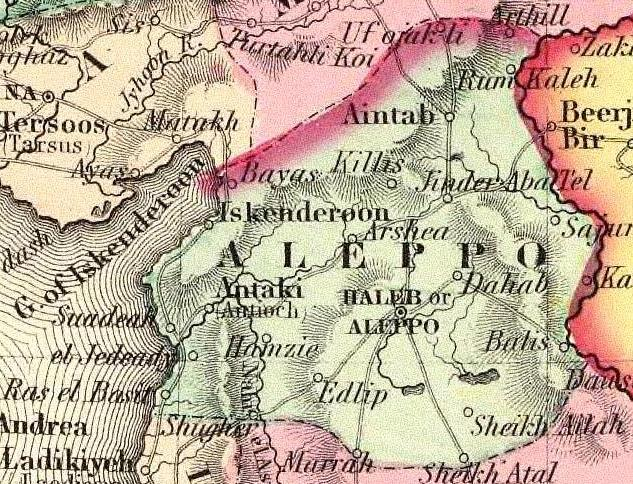
The Vilayet of Aleppo in 1855

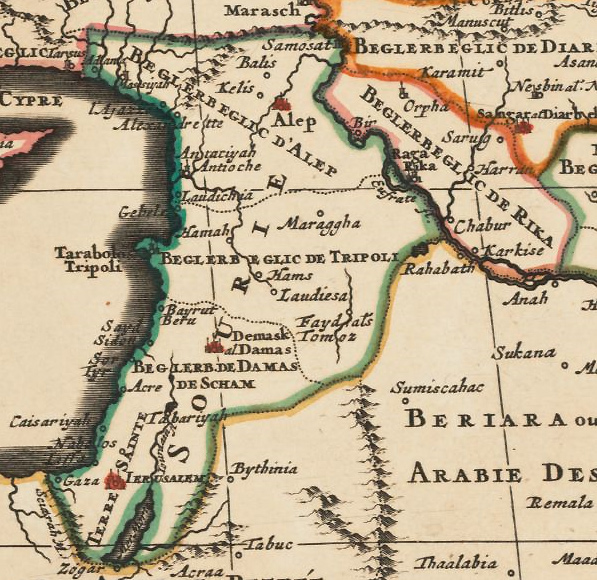
The Province of Aleppo in 1600
