= Golemantsi =

Golemantsi Beyköy
- Village
- Location within Bulgaria
- Coordinates: 41°47′N 25°29′E
- Country: Bulgaria
- Province: Haskovo Province
- Municipality: Haskovo
- Time zone: UTC+2 (EET)
  - Summer (DST): UTC+3 (EEST)

Golemantsi (Turkish: Beyköy) is a village in the municipality of Haskovo, in Haskovo Province, in southern Bulgaria.

== History ==
The earlier name of the village was Beyköy, founded around 1504–05, and named after his founder, Koçi Bey. It was renamed Golemantsi in 1934. The village once belonged to the agaluk of Haskovo (Turkish: Hasköylü Ağalık), once ruled by a local Ottoman family. The majority of inhabitants are Bulgarian Turks, while a minority of Thracian Bulgarians settlers came around 1924–25. The majority of the Turkish inhabitants are of the Bektashi Order, while other belong to Sunni Islam. In the village there is one mosque, one hamam and three Bektashi tekkes. The population is Muslim and there's a mosque in the village. There are no schools.

The Turkish singer Kadriye Latifova was born in this village.

On the last day of the last week of September, a village fair is held.
