= Ayan (class) =

Social class of landlords in the Ottoman Empire

The Ayan (Arabic plural: a‘yan أَعْيَان; singular: ‘ayn عَيْن) was the class of local notables or dynasts in the 16th to the early 19th century Ottoman Empire who held varying degrees of authority in provincial towns and districts. The a'yan had significant autonomy, and even armed force, but did not challenge the central Ottoman government. Though the title was awarded only to Muslims, its function was secular. The a'yan included "wealthy merchants, heads of Janissary garrisons, leaders of important craft guilds, those who had bought the right to collect taxes for the government in Istanbul, and those who supervised the distributions of wealth generated by, and the maintenance of, pious endowments." The rise of the a'yan class was part of the decentralizing trend in the Ottoman Empire which began in the 16th century, and came to define the Empire's structure until its fall in the early 20th century.

== Etymology ==
The term or title is from the Arabic meaning "a person holding a high office" or "prominent person", "eminent, noted, personage", representing as a "notable, dignitary, notability" which refer to the modern term for "VIP".

== Rise of the Ayan and significance ==
Though not all a'yan were tax farmers, the a'yan rose particularly in conjunction with the Iltizam tax structure (Ottoman tax farming). Prior to that system, only those close to the Sultan had any political capacity. Under the Timar system, provincial military governors appointed by the Sultan collected taxes and ruled over territories. However, the governors abused their relatively unchecked power to amass personal wealth and influence. Scholar Halil Inalcik describes that in the 17th and 18th centuries, "…the struggle between the provincial governors and the central administration emerge[d] as the most significant phenomenon of that period." In response, the central government granted more power and autonomy to local, wealthy individuals to challenge the governors.

This decision granted, for the first time, political access and power to those outside of the Sultan's inner circle. This decentralization allowed wealth to play a more significant factor in local influence and power. Author Gabriel Piterberg notes that, "…the main social characteristic of the rising ayan was that they were of reaya (Ottoman subject, non-military) origin, and that their ascendency can be seen as a part of a wider phenomenon… through which people of reaya origin had been able to join the askeri (tax-collecting, military) class of the empire since the 17th century." From the 16th century on, the Ottoman central government made repeated efforts to re-centralize the Empire, and though some efforts were more successful than others, none were able to eliminate the local influence held by the ayan.

== Economic roles in the Iltizam system ==
The Iltizam tax system consisted of tax farming. The Ottoman Empire, rather than using its own resources to collect taxes, awarded tax collecting rights to the highest bidder, who could keep profits after sending a portion back to the central government. Though access to these tax farms took different forms throughout the period, local a'yan developed into the chief owners of these rights. They were very efficient at sending money back to the center (far more than the governors in the preceding Timar system) and their local nature gave them more knowledge of the region and a vested interest in its success.

The tax collector role gave the ayan even more status in their regions. However, the arrangements also increased the average Ottoman subject's access to political and economic systems. Often in control of massive territories, the a'yan set up hierarchical structures underneath them to manage the tax farming process. Though the a'yan had to be Muslim, those working in these administrations did not. "Non-Muslims, such as Jews, Greeks, and Armenians, though prohibited from holding tax farm leases, could serve as financiers." Thus, in addition to serving the Empire as chief tax collectors under the Iltizam system, the a'yan also acted as one of the most significant providers of social mobility to non-Muslim groups in the Empire.

== Military responsibilities ==
The a'yan became such a powerful, landed elite class that many formed their own armies. Technically, these armies were at the service of the Sultan and could be called upon to fight for the Ottoman Empire (which they often were during the Ottomans' many wars in the 17th and 18th centuries). However, they also had significant freedom to operate. "While, on the one hand, they were military vassals to the sultan, serving in Ottoman armies during times of war, they remained, on the other hand, effectively autonomous in their home districts." These armies were primarily used to control and seize territory from other notables.

== Frustrating the central leadership ==
Though the a'yan helped the central government check the control of the governors, they quickly became their own source of headache for the Sultan. As their power and influence grew, they began to undermine the government in Constantinople. They resisted restrictions placed upon their authority. "For example, they would often pass tax farms from one generation to the next instead of returning the farm to the state. Some stopped sending revenues to Istanbul altogether." Muhammad Ali Pasha was able to run Egypt effectively as an independent state until British occupation. Others used their armies to carve out pieces of the weakened Ottoman Empire and even lead independence campaigns. Ultimately, the Ottoman center was unable to permanently end their influence. Mahmud II executed some dissident a'yan and sent threats to others in the early 19th century, which brought increased cooperation, but the notables ultimately maintained some form of control across the Empire until the Ottomans’ collapse in the early 20th century.

== Local notability ==
In addition to the urban notables discussed above, the Ottoman mashriq also included a much larger, though less economically and politically influential rural notables. Most rural notables originated in, and belonged to, the fellahin/peasantry class, forming a lower-echelon land-owning gentry in Palestine's post-Tanzimat countryside and emergent towns.

The rural notability was composed of rural sheikhs, village or clan mukhtars who took exploited changing legal, administrative and political conditions, and global economic realities, to achieve socio-economic and political ascendancy using households, marriage alliances and networks of patronage. Over all, they played a leading role in the development of modern Palestine into the late 20th century.
