= Arpalik =

Temporary large estate under the Ottoman Empire

Under the Ottoman Empire, an arpalik or arpaluk (Turkish: Arpalık) was a large estate (i.e. sanjak) entrusted to some holder of senior position, or to some margrave, as a temporary arrangement before they were appointed to some appropriate position. Arpalik was a kind of appanage given to members of the Ottoman elite for tax farming.

== Etymology ==
The barleycorn was known as arpa in Turkish, and the feudal system in Ottoman Empire employed the term arpalik, or "barley-money", to refer to a second allowance made to officials to offset the costs of fodder for their horses (for covering the expenses of keeping a small unit of cavalry).

== History ==
The number of viziers was steadily increasing in the Ottoman Empire since the 16th century. Many of them were not satisfied with the income they received so the institution of arpalik was introduced.

The rank of the people who were given arpalik was often higher than rank of the regular governor of the whole district. The institution of arpalik was introduced to make burden of government officials easier by compensating losses of its high officials. Instead of resolving problems, the arpalik created new, bigger ones. The exact duties of arpalik holders were never precisely defined by the Ottoman government which caused frequent tensions between the Porte and the province. This tensions probably additionally contributed to the decay of the traditional timar (fiefdom) system because it left sipahi out of the clear chain of command.

Initially, in the sixteenth century, the number of sanjaks given as arpalik was very small. After the decline of the timar (fief) system many sanjaks in Anatolia were given as arpaliks to high Ottoman officials.
