= Aleppo Province =

Aleppo Province may refer to:

- Aleppo Governorate, Syria
- Aleppo Eyalet, Ottoman Empire
- Aleppo Vilayet, Ottoman Empire
