= Turkomans of Aleppo =

Tribal administrative division of the Ottoman Empire

The Turkomans of Aleppo (Ottoman Turkish: تركمان حلب, romanized: Türkmān-ı Haleb) were an administrative unit of the Ottoman Empire composed of Turkoman tribes dwelling in but not limited to Aleppo Eyalet. The areas inhabited by the population belonging to this administrative formation included the vicinities of Damascus, Ayntab, Birecik, Azaz, Hama, Ravendan, Manbij, Rumkale, Bagras, and Besni.

== Bibliography ==
- Altınay, Ahmet Refik (1930). Anadolu'da Türk aşiretleri. Istanbul: Devlet Matbaası. OCLC 23547790.
- Çakır, Enver (21 October 2019). "Les Turkmenes d'Alep a l'époque ottomane (1516-1700)" [The Turkomans of Aleppo in the Ottoman Period]. In Winter, Stefan; Ade, Mafalda (eds.). Alep Et Sa Province À L'époque Ottomane [Aleppo and Its Hinterland in the Ottoman Period] (in French). Brill. pp. 1–27. ISBN 9789004414006.
- Şahin, İlhan (1982). "XVI. Asırda Halep Türkmenleri" [Turkomans of Aleppo during the XVIth Century]. Istanbul University Journal of History (12): 687–712. ISSN 2619-9505.
