= Resm-i sicill =

The resm-i sicill was a tax in the Ottoman Empire; it was a fixed fee for recording a case in a kadı's records.
