= Otlak resmi =

Ottoman Caliphate tax

Otlak resmi was a tax on pasture land in the Ottoman Caliphate. It was paid annually by herdsmen during the cold season (zemheri), to the timar holder or directly to the treasury, in return for the right to let their livestock graze on open pasture.

It could prove quite difficult to enforce otlak resmi (and other taxes) on nomadic farmers in border areas, who might try to play one state's tax-collector off against the other.

Otlak resmi was a divani tax.

It was one of several taxes imposed in 1522-1523.
