= Dynatoi =

Term for senior titleholder

The dynatoi (Greek: δυνατοί, sing. Δυνατός, Dynatos "the powerful") was a legal term in the Byzantine Empire, denoting the senior levels of civil, military and ecclesiastic (including monastic) officialdom, who usually, but not always, also commanded considerable fortunes and landed estates. Although such positions were not usually hereditary, by the late 10th and early 11th centuries they had started to become monopolized by a limited number of families who by the mid-11th century formed a hereditary aristocracy.

Although the exact composition of the dynatoi class has been the subject of considerable scholarly debate (cf. Lemerle), in economic terms, it encompassed the wealthy land-owners as opposed to the middling and small landowners, the penetes (πένητες). The former were usually members of military families, who had been able to use their influence to grab up the extensive lands that had been abandoned, especially in Asia Minor, as the result of the invasions of the 7th and 8th centuries. As the Empire's military position recovered from the 9th century on, these lands became profitable again, and major provincial magnate families began to appear. Among the main examples are the Phokades and the Maleinoi, who almost monopolized the senior administrative and military posts in Asia Minor in the early and middle 10th century. The dynatoi were able to use their political and financial strength to enrich themselves at the expense of the penetes, who had hitherto formed the main pillar of Byzantine society and economy. Consequently, several emperors from Romanos I Lekapenos (reigned 920–944) to Basil II (r. 976–1025) enacted agrarian legislation to combat the activities of the dynatoi, and to prevent their acquisition of the stratiotika ktemata, the military lands allocated to the maintenance of the thematic armies. Basil II in particular showed care to check the dynatoi through the imposition of the allelengyon ("mutual guarantee") tax, making them liable to pay the taxes of their poorer neighbours.

In the event, these efforts failed due to the rise of the provincial aristocracy, represented by the Komnenos dynasty, to power: in the 12th century, large latifundia spread throughout the countryside at the expense of smaller communities. The influence of the dynatoi reached its apogee in the Palaiologan period (1261–1453), and was marked by a concomitant decline in the authority of the central state government.

== See also ==
- Fiefdom
- Pronoia
- Strateia
- Timariot

== Bibliography ==
- Cappel, Andrew J. (1991). "Dynatoi". In Kazhdan, Alexander (ed.). The Oxford Dictionary of Byzantium. Oxford and New York: Oxford University Press. pp. 667–668. ISBN 0-19-504652-8.
- Laiou, Angeliki E., ed. (2002), The Economic History of Byzantium: From the Seventh through the Fifteenth Century, Dumbarton Oaks, ISBN 978-0-88402-332-6, esp. pp. 1074–82, 1087–1091
- Lemerle, Paul (1979), The Agrarian History of Byzantium from the Origins to the Twelfth Century: The Sources and Problems, Galway University Press
- McGeer, Eric (2000), The land legislation of the Macedonian emperors, Pontifical Institute of Mediaeval Studies, ISBN 0-88844-288-2
- Morris, Rosemary (1976), "The Powerful and the Poor in Tenth-Century Byzantium: Law and Reality", Past and Present, vol. 73, pp. 3–27
- Ostrogorsky, George (1966), "V. Agrarian Conditions in the Byzantine Empire in the Middle Ages]", Cambridge Economic History of Europe, Volume Ι (2nd ed.), Cambridge University Press, pp. 205–234, archived from the original on 2012-08-14
- Rosser, John H. (2011), "Dynatoi", Historical Dictionary of Byzantium, Scarecrow Press, pp. 162–163, ISBN 9780810874770
- Toynbee, Arnold (1973), "The Encroachments of the Δυνατοί on the Land-holdings of the Πένητες and the Emperors' Agrarian Legislation", Constantine Porphyrogenitus and His World, Oxford University Press, pp. 145–176, ISBN 0-19-215253-X
