= Allelengyon =

Tax established in 1002 in the Byzantine Empire

The allelengyon (Greek: ἀλληλέγγυον) was a tax revamped and edited in 1002 by the Byzantine Emperor Basil II to require the wealthiest landowners to pay the tax debts owed by their poorer neighbors. It relied on a concept long extant in Hellenistic and Byzantine law, but was abolished by Romanos III Argyros in 1028.

== Background ==
The term allelengye (ἀλληλεγγύη, "mutual guarantee/security, solidarity") is first attested in papyri from Oxyrhynchus and identifies a joint guarantee over a debt or another fiscal obligation. By the early Byzantine period (4th–7th centuries), it had become a Greek equivalent of the Latin term fideiussio. According to a novella of Justinian I (r. 527–565), there were two types, one of limited liability among the co-sureties and one of unlimited liability for any and all fiscal and legal responsibilities arising. In the usage of 9th- and 10th-century texts, its meaning had shifted slightly to replace the previous term epibole in describing the collective tax obligation among rural communities, a Hellenistic fiscal principle for rapid and constant revenue: thus in the legislation of Nikephoros I (r. 802–811) a community had to cover collectively for any of its poorer members who were currently in military service and unable to pay, and later legislation extended this to the obligations of any peasants who had fled the land.

== Basil II's law ==
In 1002, Emperor Basil II (r. 976–1025) instituted the allelengyon as a specific law, which obliged the wealthier landholders (the dynatoi) to cover for the arrears of the poorer tax-payers. Its exact provisions are unknown, but the law proved unpopular with the wealthier sections of society. Pressure from the Church led to its cancellation in 1028, by Romanos III Argyros (r. 1028–1034). However, the term appears in the sources as late as the turn of the 12th century, when the future Patriarch of Constantinople Nicholas Mouzalon accused tax collectors of still applying the allelengyon to extract taxes from peasants.

== Sources ==
- Cutler, Anthony J. (1991). "Allelengyon". In Kazhdan, Alexander (ed.). The Oxford Dictionary of Byzantium. Oxford and New York: Oxford University Press. p. 69. ISBN 0-19-504652-8.
- Lemerle, Paul (1979), The Agrarian History of Byzantium from the Origins to the Twelfth Century: The Sources and Problems, Galway University Press
- McGeer, Eric (2000), The land legislation of the Macedonian emperors, Pontifical Institute of Mediaeval Studies, ISBN 0-88844-288-2
- Morris, Rosemary (1976), "The Powerful and the Poor in Tenth-Century Byzantium: Law and Reality", Past and Present, vol. 73, pp. 3–27
- Ostrogorsky, George (1966), "V. Agrarian Conditions in the Byzantine Empire in the Middle Ages]", Cambridge Economic History of Europe, Volume Ι (2nd ed.), Cambridge University Press, pp. 205–234, archived from the original on 2012-08-14
