= Kadi (Ottoman Empire) =

Official in the Ottoman Empire

A kadi (Ottoman Turkish: قاضی, kadı) was an official in the Ottoman Empire. In Arabic, the term qāḍī (قاضي) typically refers to judges who preside over matters in accordance with sharia Islamic law; under Ottoman rule, however, the kadi also became a crucial part of the imperial administration. After Mehmed II codified his Kanun, kadis relied on this dynastic secular law, local customs, and sharia to guide their rulings. Along with adjudicating over criminal and civil matters, the kadi oversaw the administration of religious endowments and was the legal guardian of orphans and others without a guardian. Although Muslims, in particular Muslim men, possessed a higher status in the kadi's court, non-Muslims and foreigners also had access to the judicial system. Under the Ottomans' initial system of feudal land grants, the timar system, the kadi served as an important check on the power of the local and regional military lords. Despite the unquestioned authority of the sultan, kadis possessed a certain degree of autonomy in their rulings.

Some kadis worked at various positions within the imperial administration but typically a kadi oversaw a jurisdiction called a kadiluk, usually consisting of a city and its surrounding villages. These territories were initially identical with kazas, the subdivisions of the empire's sanjuks, and the kadi oversaw a great deal of administrative work. Over time and particularly after the Tanzimat reforms of the 19th century, the administrative tasks of the kaza were given to a separate kaymakam and the kadi became solely occupied with legal matters.

== Timar System ==
The Ottoman Empire was governed through a top-down hierarchy with all authority ultimately residing with the sultan but, as the empire began aggressively acquiring vast territories with diverse populations, the imperial authority adopted the timar ("land grant") system to ensure it would continue to be able to field an adequate military force, to maintain local control, and to provide the central authority with a stable flow of local taxes. Choosing from members of the ulema (religious and legal scholars), the berats of the sultan appointed a kadi to a district. Within each district, a bey from the military class carried out the sultan's executive authority while the kadi represented his legal authority. The division of power between these two authorities produced a delicate balance; the bey needed a kadi's judgement to punish a subject, and the kadi could not carry out his own rulings. Amy Singer, “It was to them that peasants brought their complaints of abusive behavior suffered at the hands of the sipahis and others.” Although the kadi also often abused their authority, the division of power allowed the tax paying class to have their grievances addressed without involving the far-away imperial authority. The power vested in the kadi allowed them to protect the legitimacy of the timar system while also securing the empire's tax base.

== Autonomy ==
The delegation of power to the kadi from the sultan gave the kadi certain freedoms, especially concerning their application of the law, but also reaffirmed the sultan's authority. As noted by Ronald Jennings, “The imperial authority could easily have overshadowed or smothered the authority and initiative of the kadi. The Porte appointed kadis and dismissed them at will, set the bounds of judicial administrative units, and kept in regular correspondence with its kadis. Not many kadis would have dared to tempt the imperial will, and fewer still could have withstood its wrath.” Kadis followed the orders of the sultan and his court while retaining autonomy in their rulings. Due to this autonomy, the kadis played an important role in initiating change in Ottoman jurisprudence. A kadi's rulings did not extend beyond individual cases, but the way in which they applied laws often influenced the imperial authority's interpretation of the law. For example, judgments by kadi concerning certain cash endowments (waqf), which came under scrutiny due to the connection with interest and usury, eventually helped legitimize the practice. The extent to which a kadi could assert his own independence remains unclear, but they had enough leeway to help guide the development of Ottoman law.
