= Agaluk =

Ottoman feudal unit governed by an aga, or lord

An agaluk (Ottoman Turkish: آغالق, romanized: Ağalık) was a feudal unit of the Ottoman Empire governed by an agha (tax collector landlord).

In Bosnian history, the word agaluk often refers to land owned by an aga.

== See also ==
- Subdivisions of the Ottoman Empire
- Kadiluk
- Pashaluk
- Sanjak
- Timar, land granted by the Ottoman sultans between the fourteenth and sixteenth centuries
