= Strateia =

Strateia (Greek: στρατεία) is a term used in the Byzantine Empire, which according to the Oxford Dictionary of Byzantium "signified enrollment into state (civil or military) or ecclesiastical service and the attendant obligations".

The term is the direct analogue of the Latin term militia, which applied to all categories of state officials already under the late Roman Empire.

The most common usage of the term in middle Byzantine times was in the military sphere: the holder of a strateia, or stratiotes (στρατιώτης), was obliged either to provide military service himself, or to provide money for the upkeep of a soldier, either as an individual or as a group/community (syndotai, "co-givers").

By the 10th century, the strateia had evolved from being a personal, hereditary duty of the stratiotes and his family, to a duty attached to the military lands (stratiotika ktemata) that were then allocated to the individual stratiotai. The stratiotika ktemata probably originated in the military crisis of the 7th century, when the state was forced to offer land in lieu of cash payment in exchange for the strateia, but they are not actually attested until the 10th century. By that time, various categories of strateiai existed, based on the income of the lands attached to them: alongside strateiai for the upkeep of sailors, infantrymen and cavalrymen, these included strateiai for the upkeep of demosios dromos (public post) and of a heavy cavalryman (cataphract), the latter a new service instituted under Nikephoros II Phokas in the 960s. The strateiai of sailors fell in two categories: the sailors of the maritime themes, who had to equip and fight themselves and saw more action, received lands worth four pounds of gold, while the sailors of the smaller regional fleets, as well as the central Imperial Fleet in Constantinople held property of two pounds of gold (the Imperial Fleet received cash salaries in addition).

In Byzantine law, the stratiotai were distinguished from the general agricultural population (georgoi); the stratiotai were even prohibited from engaging in commerce or agriculture themselves, and exempted from all the other fiscal obligations save the aerikon and kanon taxes. They also received pay (roga) and state-sponsored supplies (opsonion) for taking part in military expeditions and performing labour in public works. Successive 10th-century emperors also took care to maintain the system by placing restrictions on the sale of the stratiotika ktemata: Constantine VII set minimum inalienable values of four pounds of gold for cavalrymen and two pounds for sailors, which Nikephoros II Phokas raised it to 12 pounds to ensure that the cataphract strateiai would be maintained. Abandoned properties were automatically restored to the original owner without compensation, having a retroactive force of 40 years, and rights of pre-emption (protimesis) on any available military land was granted to relatives or members of the same community as the original holder's. The exact nature of the stratiotai during the heyday of the theme system in the 7th–11th centuries has been the subject of debate, with views ranging from their identification as "soldier-farmers" by George Ostrogorsky to the view of Paul Lemerle that 10th-century stratiotai did not actually campaign themselves, but provided only material support. Evidence from contemporary documents seems to support the former view, however.

By the 11th century, the strateia had become a purely fiscal obligation, and no longer entailed any requirement for rendering personal military service. Consequently, instead of native Byzantine soldiers, mercenaries were increasingly hired by the proceeds from the strateia, a process accelerated after the late 11th century with the loss of the recruiting grounds of Asia Minor to the Seljuk Turks. Like all other fiscal exactions, exemptions from it could be secured. Even after the fiscalization of the strateia, the term "stratiotes" remained in usage as a fiscal term for a class of landowners until at least the 14th century.

The strateia is not to be confused with pronoia, a similar but distinct term employed from the 12th century on. The strateioumenoi farmed their own land, while pronoiarioi merely received the proceeds from their grants to maintain themselves.

== See also ==
- Fiefdom
- Pronoia
- Timar

== General and cited references ==
- Kazhdan, Alexander, ed. (1991). The Oxford Dictionary of Byzantium. Oxford and New York: Oxford University Press. ISBN 0-19-504652-8.
