= Sanjak =

Second-level province of the Ottoman Empire

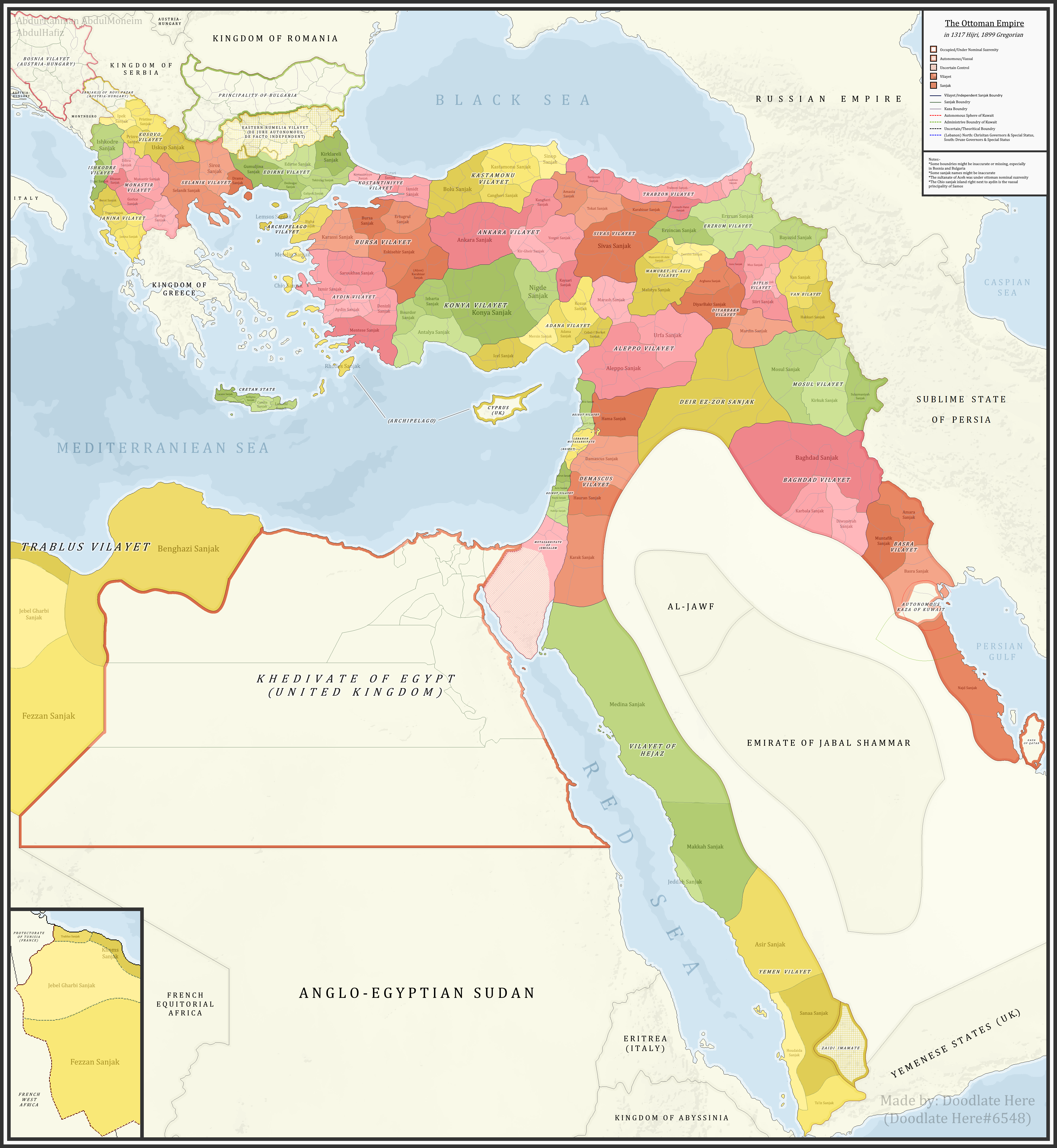
The Vilayets and Sanjaks of the Ottoman Empire in 1899

A sanjak or sancak (Ottoman Turkish: سنجاق, sancak, "flag, banner") was an administrative division of the Ottoman Empire. The Ottomans also sometimes called the sanjak a liva (لوا, livâ), using the name's calque in Arabic and Persian.

Banners were a common form of organization of nomadic groups on the Eurasian Steppe including the early Turks, Mongols, and Manchus and were used as the name for the initial first-level territorial divisions at the formation of the Ottoman Empire. Upon the empire's expansion and the establishment of eyalets as larger provinces, sanjaks were used as the second-level administrative divisions. They continued in this purpose after the eyalets were replaced by vilayets during the Tanzimat reforms of the 19th century.

Sanjaks were typically headed by a bey or sanjakbey. The Tanzimat reforms initially placed some sanjaks under kaymakams and others under mutasarrifs; a sanjak under a mutasarrif was known as a mutasarriflik. The districts of each sanjak were known as kazas. These were initially overseen by Islamic judges (kadi) and thus identical to their kadiluks. During the 1864 round of reforms, their administrative duties were given to kaymakams instead. Under the timar system of the early empire, fiefs held by timariot sipahis were also an important feature of each sanjak.

Sanjaks were initially carried over into the Republic of Turkey before being reorganized as provinces (Turkish: il) in the 1920s.

== Etymology ==
Sanjak (/ˈsændʒæk/) is one English transcription of the Ottoman Turkish name sancak (سنجاق). The modern transcription varies as modern Turkish uses the letter ⟨c⟩ for the sound [dʒ]. The name originally meant "flag" or "banner", derived from Proto-Turkic reconstructed as *sančgak ("lance", "spear") from the streamers attached by Turkish riders. Shared banners were a common organization for Eurasian nomads, were used similarly by the Byzantine Empire's banda, and continue to be used as the name for administrative divisions in Inner Mongolia and Tuva. Alternative English spellings include sanjac, sanjack, sandjak, sanjaq, sinjaq, sangiaq, and zanzack, although these are now all obsolete or archaic. Sanjaks have also been known as sanjakships and sanjakates, although these more appropriately refer to the office of a sanjakbey.

Sanjaks were also known as livâ (لوا) from their name's calque in Arabic (لواء, liwāʾ) and Persian. In the other languages of the Ottoman Empire, they were known as nahang (նահանգ, "province") in Armenian; as okrǔg (окръг, "province") in Bulgarian; as santzáki (σαντζάκι), libás (λιβάς), dioikēsis (Διοίκησις, "diocese"), eparchia (επαρχία, "eparchy") in Greek; and as sancak in Ladino.

== Ottoman Empire ==
=== History ===
The first sanjaks appear to have been created by Orhan c. 1340 or earlier. These were Sultan-öyügü (later Sultan-önü), Hudavendigar-eli, Koca-eli and Karasi-eli.

The districts which made up an eyalet were known as sanjaks, each under the command of a sanjak-bey. The number of sanjaks in each eyalet varied considerably. In 1609, Ayn Ali noted that Rumelia Eyalet had 24 sanjaks, but that six of these in the Peloponnesos had been detached to form the separate Morea Eyalet. Anatolia had 14 sanjaks and the Damascus Eyalet had 11. There were, in addition, several eyalets where there was no formal division into sanjaks. These, in Ayn Ali's list were Basra and part of the Baghdad, Al-Hasa, Egypt, Tripoli, Tunis and Algiers. He adds to the list Yemen, with the note that 'at the moment the Imams have usurped control'. These eyalets were, however, exceptional: the typical pattern was the eyalet subdivided into sanjaks. By the 16th century, these presented a rational administrative pattern of territories, based usually around the town or settlement from which the sanjak took its name, and with a population of perhaps 100,000.

However, this had not always been the case. It seems more likely that before the mid-15th century, the most important factor in determining the pattern of sanjaks was the existence of former lordships and principalities, and of areas where marcher lords had acquired territories for themselves and their followers. Some sanjaks in fact preserved the names of the dynasties that had ruled there before the Ottoman conquest.

In 1609, Ayn Ali made a note on their formal status. In listing the sanjaks in the Diyarbekir Eyalet, he notes that it had ten 'Ottoman districts' and, in addition, eight 'districts of the Kurdish lords'. In these cases, when a lord died, the governorship did not go to an outsider, but to his son. In other respects, however, they resembled normal Ottoman sanjaks, in that the revenues were registered and allocated to fief holders who went to war under their lord. In addition, however, Ayn Ali noted that there were five 'sovereign sanjaks', which their lords disposed of 'as private property', and which were outside the system of provincial government. Ayn Ali records similar independent or semi-independent districts in the Çıldır Eyalet in north-eastern Turkey and, most famously, in the Van Eyalet where the Khans of Bitlis ruled independently until the 19th century. There were other areas, too, which enjoyed autonomy or semi-autonomy. In the second half of the 16th century, Kilis came under the hereditary governorship of the Janbulad family, while Adana remained under the rule of the pre-Ottoman dynasty of Ramazanoghlu. In Lebanon, Ayn Ali refers to the Druze chieftains with the note: 'there are non-Muslim lords in the mountains.' There were other autonomous enclaves in the Empire, whether or not they received formal recognition as sanjaks but, by the 16th century, these were exceptional.

In the 1840s, the boundaries of sanjaks were redrawn to establish equal units of comparable population and wealth. Each of these sanjaks was headed by a muhassil.

=== Government ===
The sanjak was governed as a vilayet, just on a smaller scale. The mutesarrif was appointed by Imperial decree and represented the vali, corresponding with the government through him except in some special circumstances where the sanjak was independent. In such cases, the mutesarrif then corresponded directly with the Ministry of the Interior. Most of the sanjaks throughout the Empire were under the rule of non-hereditary appointees, who had no permanent family of territorial connections with the area.

A sanjak was typically divided into kazas, each overseeing a major city and its surrounding hinterland. Initially, the civil administration was headed by an Islamic judge (kadi) and the area equivalent to his jurisdiction (kadiluk). During the Tanzimat reforms, the kadis were eventually restricted to judicial functions and administration ceded to a kaymakam and treasurer. The kazas were further divided into subdistricts (nahiye) and villages, each overseen by an appointed official or local council.

== Legacy ==
=== Occupied Enemy Territory Administration ===
Following World War I, the sanjaks were used as the basis for the Occupied Enemy Territory Administration. OETA South was formed from the sanjaks of Jerusalem, Nablus, and Acre. OETA North—later renamed OETA West—was formed from the sanjaks of Beirut, Lebanon, and Latakia, along with a number of surrounding subdistricts. OETA East was formed from the sanjaks of Syria Vilayet and Hejaz Vilayet.

=== Mandate of Syria ===
The Sanjak of Alexandretta was ceded by the French Mandate for Syria and the Lebanon to Turkey in 1939, becoming its Hatay Province.

=== Liwas ===
After the fall of the Ottoman Empire in the early 20th century, the liwa was used by some of its Arab successor states as an administrative divisions until it was gradually replaced by other terms like mintaqah. It is still used occasionally in Syria to refer specifically to the former Sanjak of Alexandretta, known in Arabic as Liwāʾ Iskenderun and still claimed by the Syrian state.

=== Sandžak ===
The unofficial geocultural region of Sandžak in Serbia and Montenegro derives its name from the former Ottoman Sanjak of Novi Pazar.
