= Askeri =

Member of a class of imperial administrators

Under the Ottoman Empire, an askeri (Ottoman Turkish: عسكري) was a member of a class of military administrators.

This elite class consisted of three main groups: the military, the court officials, and clergy. Though the term askeri itself literally means "of the military", it more broadly encompassed all higher levels of imperial administration. To become a member of this ruling elite, one thus had to hold a political office in the service of the Ottoman Empire, meaning that both Muslims and non-Muslims in those positions could rank as askeri.

After Napoleon invaded Ottoman Egypt in 1798, a reform movement in the regime of Sultan Selim III aimed to reduce the numbers of the askeri class, who were the first-class citizens or military class.

Sultan Selim III was taken prisoner (1807) and murdered (1808) in the course of Janissary revolts. A subsequent sultan, Mahmud II (r. 1808–1839), was patient but remembered the results of the uprising in 1807. In June 1826 he caused a revolt among the Janissaries, kept them all in their barracks and slaughtered thousands of them.

The askeris stood in contrast with the reaya, the tax-paying lower class, and with the kul, or slave class, which included the Janissaries.

== See also ==
- Rayah
