= Pronoia =

Byzantine revenue system

The pronoia (pl. pronoiai; Greek: πρόνοια, meaning "care", "forethought" or "providence," from πρό 'before' and νόος 'mind') was a system of granting dedicated streams of state income to individuals and institutions in the late Byzantine Empire. Beginning in the 11th century and continuing until the empire's fall in the 15th century, the system differed in significant ways from European feudalism of the same period.

== The institution ==
A pronoia was a grant that temporarily transferred imperial fiscal rights to an individual or institution. These rights were most commonly taxes or incomes from cultivated lands, but they could also be other income streams such as water and fishing rights, customs collection, etc. and the various rights to a specific piece of geography could be granted to separate individuals. Grants were for a set period, usually lifetime, and revokable at will by the emperor. When institutions, usually monasteries, received grants they were effectively in perpetuity since the institutions were ongoing. Grants were not transferable or (excluding certain exceptional cases late in the institution) hereditary; a pronoia gave the grantee possession, not ownership, which remained imperial.

The limits and specifics of a pronoia were recorded in an Imperial document called praktika ('records'); holders of pronoia (the grantees, in other words) were called pronoiarios, and those working the income stream in question (for instance, farmers on the land) were called paroikoi in the documents. The word pronoia could refer to the grant itself (land, for instance), its monetary value, or the income it produced.

Although pronoia was often used to reward military service or other loyalties, it carried no specific military obligation (in contrast to feudal fiefs in Western Europe), although the threat of revocation provided coercive power for the state.

== Early pronoia system ==
The pronoetes were the holders of pronoia. The Latin term to define this officer was curator and is to be identified with the curator domus divinae, the administrator of imperial lands since the time of Augustus.

By the 11th century, Byzantine aristocrats had ceased to hold any significant power. Honorific titles and power were granted by the emperor and competition was fierce; the most desired grants were those that involved governance and tax collecting in various pieces of the Empire. By the reign of Constantine IX in the middle part of the century they had also begun to assert sovereignty over various parts of the empire, collecting taxes for themselves and often plotting rebellions against the emperor.

In the late 11th century Alexius I attempted to reform the aristocracy, taking the pacifying measure of distributing Roman territory amongst its members. Doing so had the added benefit of removing them from Constantinople, making it harder for them to directly challenge the emperor's authority. Most pronoiai granted by Alexius, however, were to members of his own (Comnenus) family. Alexius simply legitimized the holding of land by aristocrats, and brought it under centralized state control.

== Pronoia in the 12th century ==
Alexius' grandson Manuel I Comnenus continued to grant land to the aristocrats, but also extended pronoiai to aristocratic officers in the army, in place of giving them a regular salary. Pronoiai developed into essentially a license to tax the citizens who lived within the boundaries of the grant (the paroikoi). Pronoiars (those who had been granted a pronoia) became something like tax collectors, who were allowed to keep some of the revenue they collected. This idea was not completely new; centuries before, Heraclius had reorganized the empire's land into military districts called Themata. Under this system, military officers (strategoi) ran each district and collected rent from the peasants who farmed the land. However, the paroikoi, under either the theme or pronoia system, were not serfs as peasants were in the feudal system of western Europe. They owed no particular loyalty or service to the strategos or pronoiar, as in both cases the emperor was still the legal owner of the land. The pronoiar was most likely not even a native of the land he had been granted.

The size and value of the pronoia, the number of paroikoi, and the duties owed by them were recorded in praktika. A pronoiar would likely be able to collect trade revenue and part of the crop harvested on the land, and could also hold hunting rights and transportation rights. A praktika also recorded the duties owed by the pronoiar to the emperor. If necessary, the emperor could request military service, although the pronoiar could not force his taxpayers to join him. Pronoiars were often reluctant to give military service if they lived a prosperous life on their grant, and they had some autonomy if they chose not to serve. If they could gain the support of their taxpayers, they could lead rebellions against the empire, but these were not as dangerous as rebellions in the capital, which Alexius' system could now more successfully avoid. Neither Alexius, Manuel, or the other 12th century emperors seemed to worry about provincial rebellions, seemingly assuming that a pronoia grant would eventually appease a rebellious noble. During the Fourth Crusade, Alexius IV still thought this way, and granted Crete to Boniface of Montferrat, under the assumption that the Crusaders would go away if their leader had some land.

== Pronoia under the Palaeologan Dynasty ==
After the Crusaders captured Constantinople in 1204, the pronoia system continued in the Empire of Nicaea, where the emperors ruled in exile. John III Ducas Vatatzes also gave pronoiai to the church and noblewomen, which had not been done before. When Constantinople was recaptured by Michael VIII Palaeologus in 1261, he allowed pronoiai to be inherited, which made the empire more like the feudal states in Europe. He also audited the pronoiai to make their values more realistic according to contemporary conditions, as the empire had lost much of its land and revenue since the 11th century. Under the Palaeologans, pronoiars could more easily be organized into military units if the emperor required their service. The emperor could also confiscate the revenues for whatever reason. Andronicus II Palaeologus, for example, used the money raised by the pronoiars to finance military expeditions against the Bulgarians, but he did not require them to provide military service themselves. During this time pronoiars could also attract followers by giving them pronoia grants of their own.

Recruiting pronoiars to form an army helped unite the remnants of the empire after 1261. However, by this time, there were only a few thousand pronoiars, and although they paid for their own expenses, the emperors could not afford a full army or navy to strengthen the empire's defenses. The impoverished empire had very little tax revenue, and pronoiars began to extract rents from the paroikoi, turning back to the old Thema system.

The empire continued to lose land to the Ottoman Empire, and Constantinople was finally lost in 1453, but the Ottomans continued to use their own version of the pronoia system, called the timar system, which they had borrowed from the Eastern Romans during their conquests.

== See also ==
- Chiflik
- Dynatoi

== Sources ==
- "Economics in Late Byzantine World," from Foundation of the Hellenic World
- Warren T. Treadgold. A History of the Byzantine State and Society. Stanford: Stanford University Press, 1997. ISBN 0-8047-2630-2
- Frederick Lauritzen, Leichoudes' pronoia of the Mangana, Zbornik Radova Vizantinoloskog Instituta 55 (2018) 81-96
