= Hass (Ottoman) =

In the Ottoman administrative-military classification of land, a hâss was an estate with revenue. It was further divided into classes.

- hass-ı hümayun, Imperial demesne (domain)
- hass-ı mir-liva, taxes for district commander
- hass-ı mirmiran, prebend of second-level pasha governing a province
