= Timar =

Feudal land granted by Ottoman sultans

A timar was a land grant by the sultans of the Ottoman Empire between the fourteenth and sixteenth centuries, with an annual tax revenue of less than 20,000 akçes. The revenues produced from the land acted as compensation for military service. A holder of a timar was known as a timariot. If the revenues produced from the timar were from 20,000 to 100,000 akçes, the land grant was called a zeamet, and if they were above 100,000 akçes, the grant would be called a hass.

== Timar system ==
In the Ottoman Empire, the timar system was one in which the projected revenue of a conquered territory was distributed in the form of temporary land grants among the Sipahis (cavalrymen) and other members of the military class including Janissaries and other servants of the sultan. These prebends were given as compensation for annual military service, for which they received no pay. In rare circumstances women could become timar holders. However, this privilege was restricted to women who were prominent within the imperial family, or high-ranking members of the Ottoman elite. Timars could be small, when they would be granted by governors, or large, which then required a certificate from the Sultan, but generally the fief had an annual tax revenue value of less than 20,000 akçes. This system of land tenure lasted roughly from the fourteenth century through the sixteenth century. The goals of the system were necessitated by financial, state and expansionist purposes. The financial aims of the system were to relieve pressure from the Ottoman state of paying the army as well as to gain a new source of revenue for the central treasury. The expansionist aims were to increase the number of cavalry soldiers and to gradually assimilate and bring conquered countries under direct Ottoman control. The Ottoman state also desired to centralize the sultan’s authority by removing the feudal system and aristocratic elements from dominating the empire.

== Power and conditions ==
Within the Timar system the state gave Timar holders, including the Sipahis, the authority to control of arable lands, vacant lands or land possessed by peasants, wastelands, fruit trees, forests or waters within the Timar territory. The Sipahis employed agents or surrogates called Kethüda, Vekil, or voyvoda to collect revenues and exercise the delegated powers. They had the right to collect certain parts of the tax revenue from arable lands in certain localities in return for service to the state. They were responsible for supervising their Timar territory and the way it was cultivated and possessed by peasants. The Sipahi was rewarded if he procured the settlement of vacant land, but punished if he caused the abandonment of cultivated land. Timar holders had police authority to pursue and arrest wrongdoers within their territories. However, they could not enforce penalties until they received a verdict from a local judge in accordance to imperial law. Their duties were to protect peasants and persons in their territory and to join the imperial army during campaigns. The sultan gave Sipahis vineyards and a meadow for the needs of their families, retainers and horses. One of the main conditions imposed by the state was that a Timar holder did not own the land, as ownership was held by the Ottoman state. Another essential condition was that Timars could not be inherited but it was not uncommon for a Timar to be reassigned to a son provided they performed military service. Holding a Timar was contingent on active military service and if a Sipahi failed to participate in military service for seven years he lost his authority over the land grant. Nevertheless, a Sipahi retained his title and could be eligible for another Timar if he remained in the military class and participated in military campaigns.

== Origins ==
Due to the nature of the documentation of the early history of the Ottomans it is very difficult to assign the Timar system a concrete date. Elements of the Timar system however can be seen to have their origins in Pre-Islamic antiquity (Ancient Middle Eastern Empires, Rome, Byzantium, and pre-Islamic Iran). Pronoia of the late Byzantine era is perhaps the immediate predecessor of the Timar system. However, it was not until the re-emergence of the empire under Mehmed I in 1413 that a tenure system that was distinctly Timar was developed. Before the collapse of the empire by Timur in 1402, Bayezid had granted quasi-Timar holdings to his own servants. With the reunification of the Ottoman lands under a Sultan, these men would once again have legal title to their holdings. Over the next fifty years this system of land tenure was largely expanded and standardized. After the conquest of Constantinople in 1453, the Ottomans turned once more to the familiar policy of expansion through conquest. With the period of consolidation that followed there was a move towards total annexation and assimilation of the provinces into the Ottoman system. This meant the elimination of local dynasties and replacing them with the Timar system and other apparatuses of provincial administration.

== Surveying and distribution ==
By the fifteenth and sixteenth centuries the surveying and distribution of conquered territory among the Sipahi class had become a very complicated and highly bureaucratic process. In the survey, known as the Tapu-tahrirs, all the fiscal information about the territory would be collected and divided into Timar. The process went as follows: 1) appoint administrator (emin – accompanied by clerk (katip) and regional judge kadı) collected available documentation about land and building ownership and local taxes 2) information is written down and codified in a narrative called (Kanunname) that mediated and resolved contradictions especially between those two non-Islamic legal traditions – local and imperial – upon which the Ottomans based their dominion 3) officials consult with local grandees and proceeded from village to village to inspect and evaluate land and other holdings 4) draw up results of the survey in a register prefaced by the Kanunname that listed the names of all the towns, villages and populations, what they produced and expected revenues.

Based on these fiscal projections, the Sultan would distribute the land and villages to the soldiers who had participated in the conquest. Initially the candidates for Timar were recommended individually to the Sultan. Upon receiving this recommendation, the Sultan commanded the provincial governor to award the candidate with Timar in the province. The candidate then, "with the Sultan’s order" (eli-emirlu), would go out and find a vacant Timar suitable for him. It has been suggested that there was a regular rotation system so that Timar holders were dismissed after serving a defined period of tenure. This length would vary case to case. As long as the candidate participated regularly in the Sultan’s military campaigns who would be eligible for a Timar grant. This made it so competing groups formed and were motivated to fight for the Sultan’s favouritism and patronage.

== Problems and decline ==
By the time Mehmed II (r. 1451–1481) reigned over the Ottoman Empire the number of candidates eligible for Timar grants had fallen substantially. There was a growing expectation among the Janissary soldiers and other Kuls of the Sultan for these grants in reward for participating in the growing number of campaigns. Furthermore, Timars were being offered to volunteers and members of the pre-Ottoman military class for their loyalty and service to the Sultan. In order to meet this new demand, existing Timars were turned into jointly held unites, or divided into shares. This growing demand also forced the Ottoman sultans to engage in further wars of conquest in neighbouring countries thus creating Timars through new surveys. This however, also increased the number of candidates for Timar grants. The solution to this crisis took two forms: more than one Sipahi holding a single Timar and instead of receiving an entire village, Sipahis were given shares in many villages in order to make up their Timar. These solutions likely had further implications than just meeting the demands of a growing demographic. The Ottoman government had a policy of keeping the registered Timars intact even while the number of Sipahis grew. Furthermore, it prevented Sipahis from gaining complete and independent control over the peasants and land within a territory. The institution of arpalik was introduced to make burden of government officials easier by compensating losses of its high officials. An arpalik was a large estate (i.e. sanjak) entrusted to some holder of senior position, or to some margrave, as a temporary arrangement before they were appointed to some appropriate position. It was a kind of appanage given to increasing number of members of the Ottoman elite for tax farming. Instead to resolving the Porte's problems, the institutions of arpalik introduced new, even bigger ones. The exact duties of the arpalik holders were never precisely defined by the Ottoman government, which caused frequent tensions between the Porte and the provinces. These tensions probably additionally contributed to the decay of the traditional timar system because it left sipahis out of the clear chain of command.

By the end of the sixteenth century the Timar system of land tenure had begun its unrecoverable decline. In 1528, the Timariot constituted the largest single division in the Ottoman army. Sipahis were responsible for their own expenses, including provision during the campaigns, their equipment, providing auxiliary men (cebelu) and valets (gulam). With the onset of new military technologies, particularly the gun, the Sipahis, who had once made up the backbone of the Ottoman army, were becoming obsolete. The long and costly wars which the Ottoman Sultans waged against the Habsburgs and Iranians had demanded the formation of a modern standing and professional army. Therefore, cash was needed to maintain them. Essentially, the gun was cheaper than a horse. By the early decades of the seventeenth century, much of the Timar revenue was brought into the central treasury as substitute money (bedel) for exemption from military service. Since they were no longer needed, when the Timar holders died off, their holdings would not be reassigned, but were brought under imperial domain. Once under direct control the vacant land would be turned into Tax Farms (muqata'ah) in order to ensure greater cash revenue for the central government.

== See also ==
- Ottoman law & land administration
  - Düstur, code of law
  - Defter, land and tax registry
  - Tanzimat, 19th-century reform movement
  - Land ownership systems
    - Chiftlik/Chiflik
    - Ottoman Land Code of 1858
  - Foreign purchases of real estate in Turkey
- Ottoman sultans
  - Bayezid I (c. 1360–1403)
  - Mehmed II (1432–1481)
  - Abdul Hamid II (1876–1909)
- Pasha, high Ottoman rank, usually given to governors
- Agha (Ottoman Empire), or lord
  - Agaluk, feudal unit governed by an Agha
- Ottoman military corps, part of feudal system
  - Janissaries
  - Sipahis
  - Timariot, Sipahi cavalryman, beneficiary of a timar fief
- Byzantine administrative system
  - Dynatoi, senior officialdom
  - Pronoia, system of granting state income to individuals and institutions
  - Strateia, enrollment into state or ecclesiastical service, often relating to military
- Israeli land and property laws
  - Torrens title in Israel
- Fiefdom
- Land reform

== Bibliography ==
- Gwinn, Robert P, Charles E. Swanson, and Philip W. Goetz. The New Encyclopædia Britannica. Vol. 8, 11, 10. London: Encyclopædia Britannica, Inc., 1986
- Goffman, Daniel. The Ottoman Empire and Early Modern Europe. Cambridge: Cambridge University, 2007
- Hütteroth, W.-D.; Abdulfattah, K. (1977). Historical Geography of Palestine, Transjordan and Southern Syria in the Late 16th Century. Erlanger Geographische Arbeiten, Sonderband 5. Erlangen, Germany: Vorstand der Fränkischen Geographischen Gesellschaft. ISBN 3-920405-41-2.
- Inalcik, Halil. An Economic and Social history of the Ottoman Empire 1300–1914. Cambridge: Cambridge University Press, 1994
- Inalcik, Halil. “Ottoman Methods of conquest.” Studia Islamica. 2 (1954): 103–129
- Lewis, Bernard. “Ottoman Land Tenure and Taxation in Syria.” Studia Islamica. (1979), pp. 109–124
- Murphey, Rhoads. “Ottoman Census Methods in the Mid-Sixteenth Century: Three Case Histories.” Studia Islamica. (1990), pp. 115–126
- Ozel, Oktay. “Limits of the Almighty: Mehmed II’s ‘Land Reform’ Revised.” Journal of the Economic and Social History of the Orient. 42 (1999), pp. 226–246
- Reindl-Kiel, Hedda. “A Woman Timar Holder in Ankara Province during the Second of the 16th Century.” Journal of the Economic and Social History of the Orient. 40 (1997), pp. 2007–238
- Wiesner-Hanks, Merry E. Early Modern Europe 1450–1789. Cambridge: Cambridge University Press, 2006
