= Timariots =

Ottoman cavalry soldiers

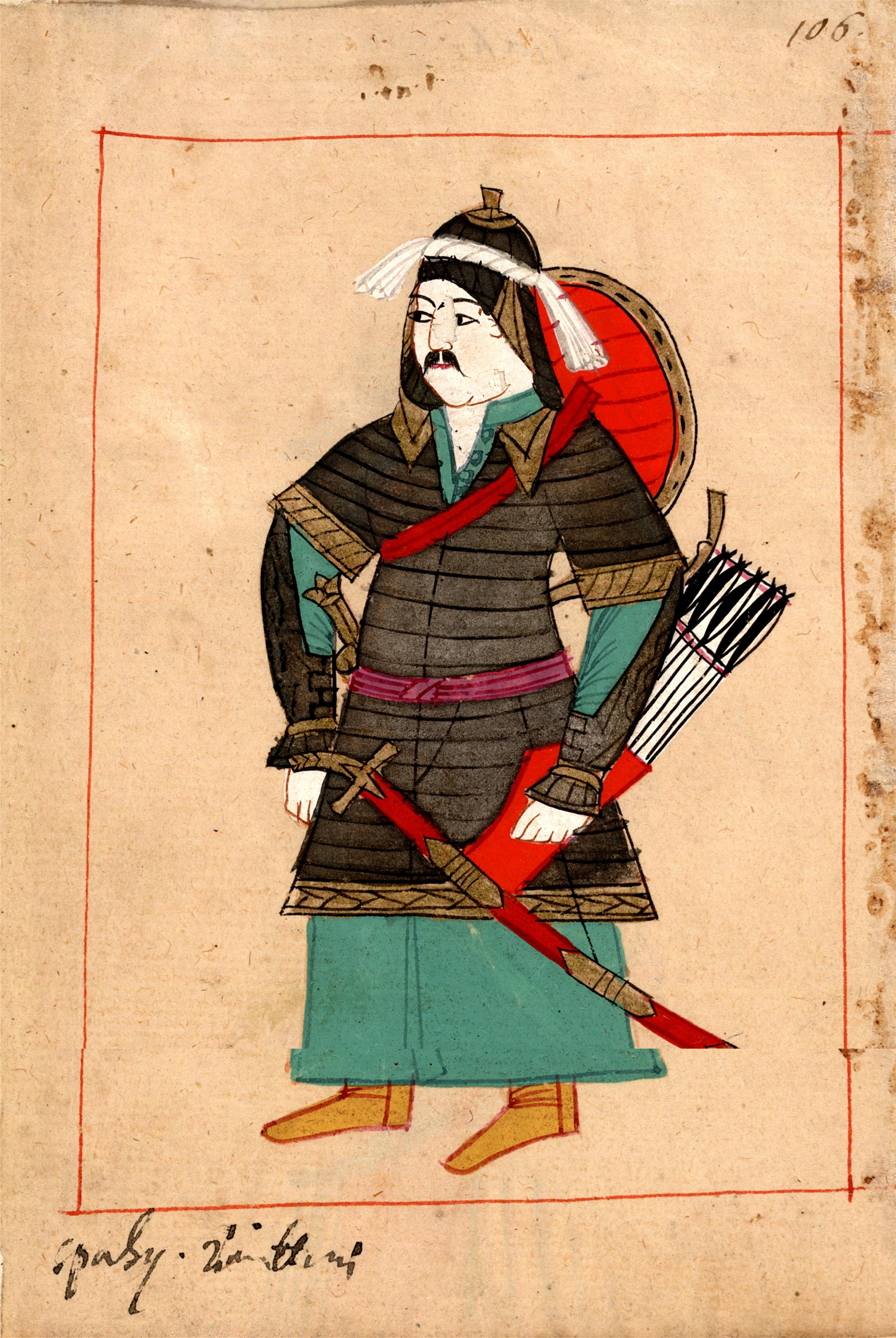
Sipahi

Timariot (or tımar holder; tımarlı in Turkish) was the name given to a Sipahi cavalryman in the Ottoman army. In return for service, each timariot received a parcel of revenue called a timar, a fief, which were usually recently conquered plots of agricultural land in the countryside. Far less commonly, the sultan would grant a civil servant or member of the imperial family a timar. Also non-military timar holders were obliged to supply the imperial army with soldiers and provisions.

The timariots provided the backbone of the Ottoman cavalry force and the army as a whole. They were obligated to fight as cavalrymen in the Ottoman military when called upon. The timariots had to assemble with the army when at war, and had to take care of the land entrusted to him in times of peace. When at war, the timariot had to bring his own equipment and in addition a number of armed retainers (cebelu). The timariot was granted feudatory with the obligation to go mounted to war and to supply soldiers and sailors in numbers proportionate to the revenue of the appanage. The timariot owed personal service for his sword in time of war and for a certain sum of money owed a number of soldiers as a substitute (cebelu). The (cebelu) was bound to live on the timariot’s estate and look after the land. When summoned for campaign the timariot and his cebelu had to present themselves with a cuirass. When a timariot failed to obey the summon he was deprived of his timar for one or two years. Timariots were expected to bring cebelus or men-at-arms as well as their own equipment on campaign, the number of cebelu being determined by revenue. The number of the timariots in the sultan's army fluctuated between 50,000 and 90,000 men. Timariots were themselves organized by sanjak-beys who ruled over groups of timars. The sanjak-beys were subordinate to the beylerbeyi and then the sultan himself. This semi-feudal arrangement allowed for the Ottomans to organize large armies at once, thus making an imperial army from what was still essentially a medieval economy. This system of using agricultural revenue to pay troops was influenced by a similar Byzantine practice and other Near Eastern states prior to the Ottoman Empire.

During peace, timariots were expected to manage the lands they were given. Each timariot did not own the land that had been granted. All agricultural lands in the Empire that were considered state property (or miri) could be granted as timars. Timariots could be removed and transferred when the sultan deemed it necessary. However, timariots were expected to collect taxes and manage the peasantry. The kanunname of each sanjak listed the specific amount of taxes and services that the timariot could collect. The central government enforced these laws rigorously, and a sipahi could lose his timar for violating regulations. The timar-holders took precautions to keep peasants on their land and were also owed certain labor from peasants, such as building a barn. The maximum amount of income from one timar was 9,999 akce per year, but most timariots did not make anywhere close to that. In the 1530s, 40 percent of timariots received less than 3,000 akce in revenue. Higher ranking officers could receive a ziamet (up to 100,000 akces) or a has (over 100,000 akce), depending on importance. The number of men and equipment the timariotes had to provide was dependent on the size of his land holdings. When the annual income of the holding was above 4.000 akçe the sipahi had to be accompanied by a soldier in a coat of mail, for income above 15.000 akçe by additional soldier for each additional 3.000 akçe. Above a certain income of the timar the sipahi horse had also to be equipped with armor of very thin steel. Tents for different purposes e.g., for treasury, kitchen, saddlery store, etc. had to be provided. This ensured that all equipment and troops for campaigns was determined in advance and Ottoman commanders knew the exact number of their forces for mobilization.

When the Ottomans conquered new territory, it was common practice to grant timars to the local aristocracy of conquered lands. The Ottomans co-opted the local nobility and eased the burden of conquest. The first group of timars in the Balkans had a strong Christian majority (Albania, Bosnia, and Serbia), but the Christian sipahis gradually disappeared due to dispossession or conversion to Islam.

Timar-status could be inherited, but the pieces of land were not inheritable to avoid the creation of any stable landed nobility. Timars were not hereditary until a decree was passed in 1585. Those who vied for timar status were fiercely competitive and the barrier to entry was high. The sipahis were also in constant competition for control of the Ottoman military with the janissary class.

== Sources ==
- Douglas, Harry (1987). "The Ottoman 'timar' system and its transformation, 1563-1656" (Document). Indiana University. ProQuest 303473407.
- Faroqhi, Suraiya N.; Fleet, Kate, eds. (2012). The Cambridge History of Turkey Volume 2: the Ottoman Empire as a World Power 1453-1603. Cambridge University Press.
- İnalcık, Halil, ed. (1978). The Ottoman Empire : Conquest, Organization and Economy. Cambridge University Press.
- İnalcık, Halil; Quataert, Donald, eds. (2003) [1990]. An Economic and Social History of the Ottoman Empire, 1300–1914. Cambridge University Press. ISBN 0-521-57456-0. Two volumes.
