= Sipahi =

Turkish cavalry

- Spahiç (Balkans)
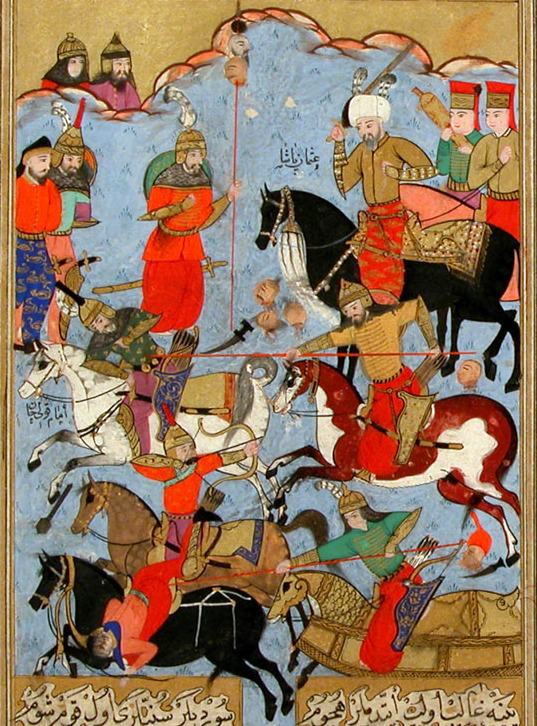
- Turkish sipahis (right) chasing down Qizilbash cavalry (left) during the Battle of Torches
- Active: 15th–19th centuries
- Country: Ottoman Empire
- Allegiance: Ottoman Empire
- Branch: Heavy cavalry
- Equipment: Kilij, shamshir, mace, war hammer, shield, lance, lasso, bow and arrow

Insignia
- Identification symbol

- Identification symbol

The sipahi (Ottoman Turkish: سپاهی, , Turkish pronunciation: [sipaːhi]) were the professional Turkish heavy cavalry of the Ottoman Empire. Sipahi units included the land grant–holding (tımar) provincial tımarlı sipahi, which constituted most of the Ottoman army, and the salaried regular kapıkulu sipahi, part of the Ottoman household troops alongside Janissaries. The irregular light cavalry akıncı ("raiders") were not considered to be sipahi.

The sipahi held a state-owned land tenure known as tımar in exchange for tax collection, security, and active military service.

== Timarli sipahi ==
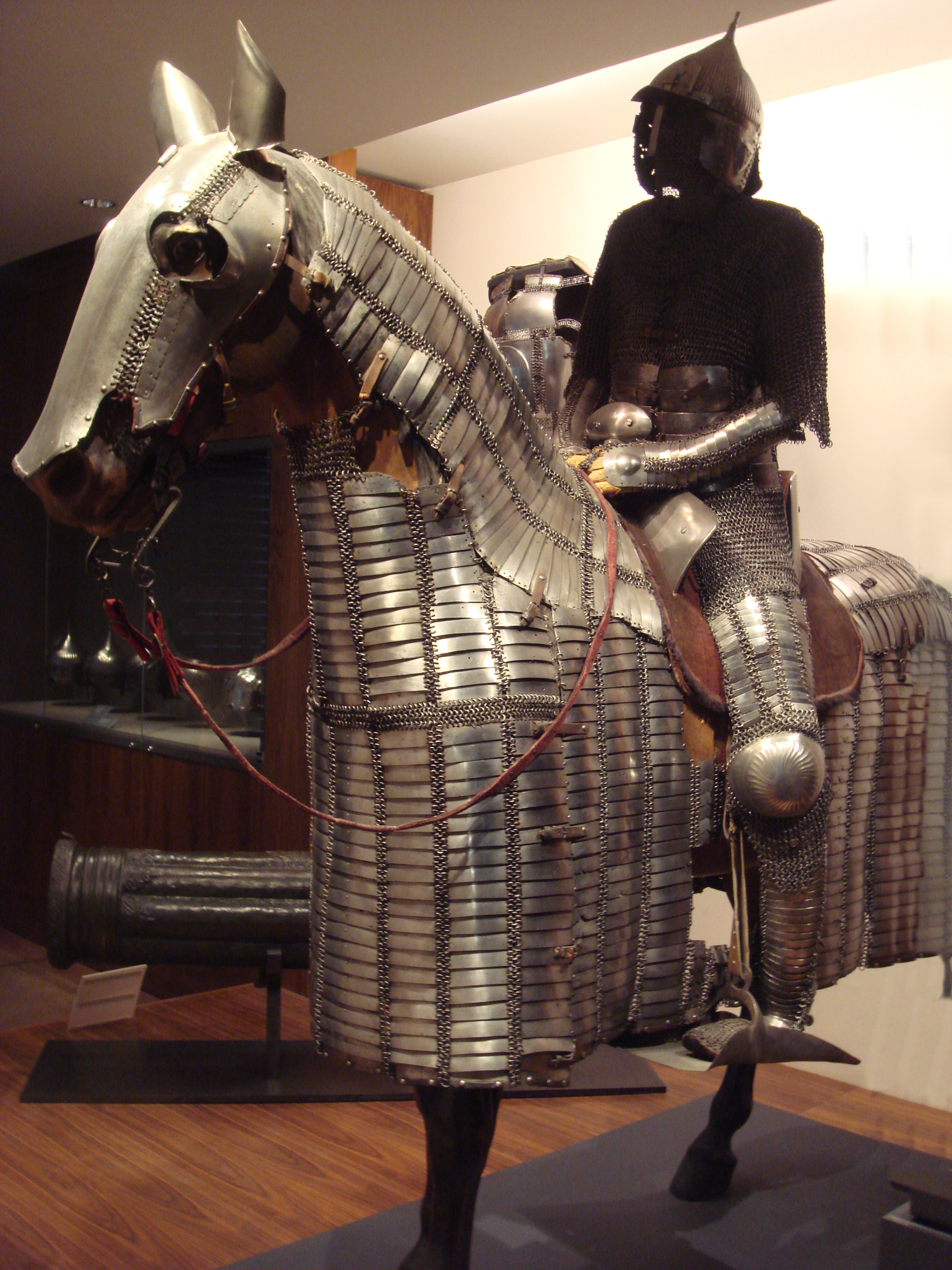
Ottoman Sipahi heavy cavalry, c. 1550

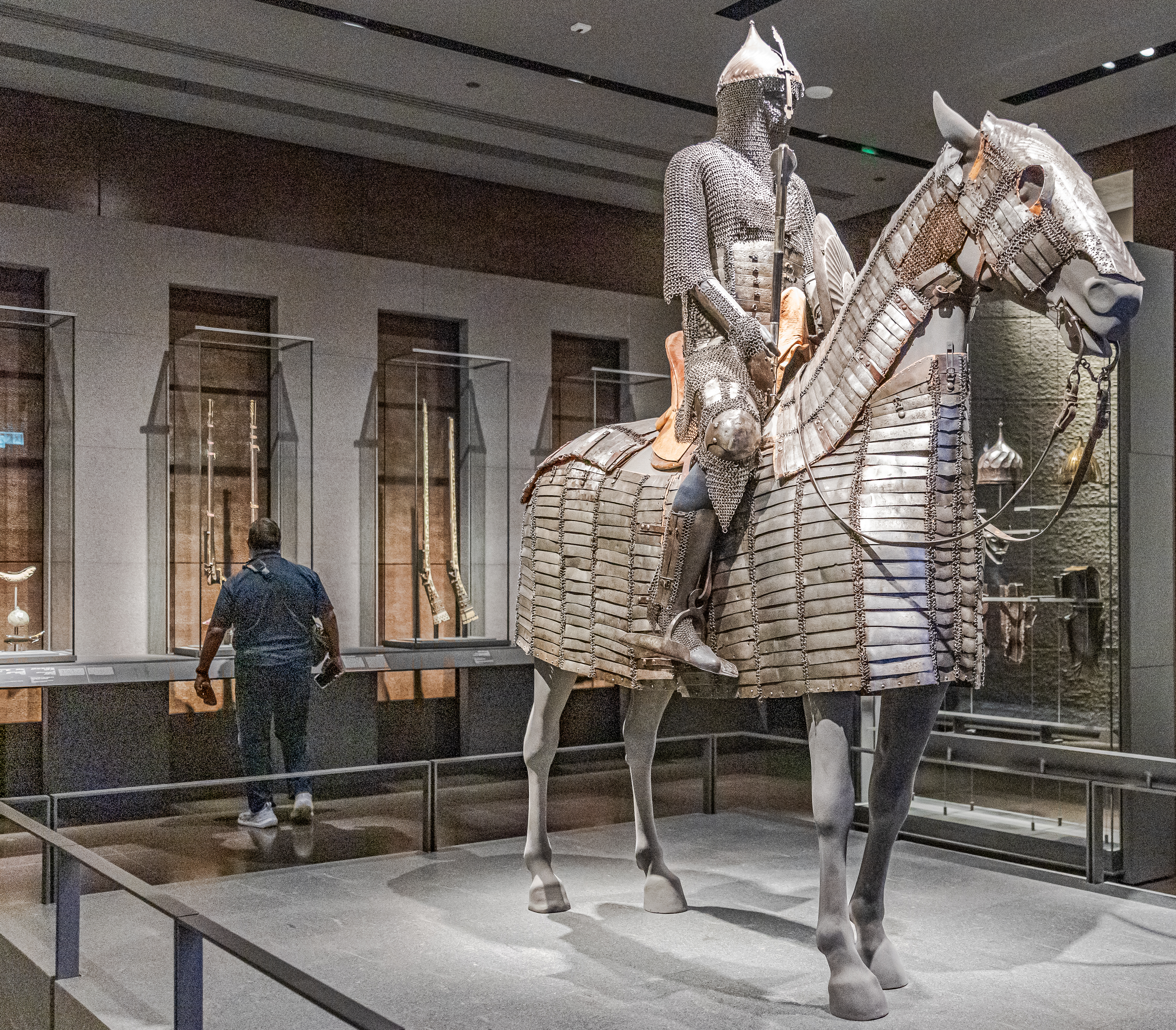
Sipahi armor and barding on display at the Museum of Islamic Art, Doha

The sipahi were introduced into the Ottoman army from the Seljuk Sultanate of Rum, being developed as a standing cavalry force at the end of the 14th century. The Timar land tenure system was standardized in the second half of the 15th century, originating in the Byzantine pronoia. The Timar territory included arable land, given to sipahi (also referred to as Turkish: tımarlı sipahi or "timariot") to supervise (as the ownership of the land, miri, was held by the Ottoman state), in exchange for tax collection, security, and active military service. The peasants were given the right to farm the lands in the Timar, while the sipahi retained a portion of land for their own use, known as çift. The sipahi collected tax revenue in the Timar and did not receive a salary from the state, while the peasants were obliged to work his çift for a number of days.

The sanjakbeys (provincial governors, who had their own force) and sipahi together assisted in keeping order and protecting the sanjak (province) in peace-time. The sipahi were obligated to join military campaigns when called upon by the Sultan, together with a specified number of soldiers, armament and provisions for the campaign based on the revenue of their Timar. A portion of sipahi were left in the province to ensure order. The sipahi were commanded by their sanjakbey in battle. Failure to appear would result in stripping of the Timar, while distinction in battle could result in expansion of Timar territory. While at first, the sipahi were both Christian and Muslim, by the 16th century they were overwhelmingly Muslim following religious conversion. Although timars were not originally granted to their holders in perpetuity (the state inheriting the land at the death of the landholder), by the end of the 17th century estates were passed on from father to son.

The number of sipahi in the 1430s–1440s was estimated at 10–15,000 in Anatolia and Rumelia, while in 1475 it was claimed that Timarli sipahi were 22,000 in Rumelia and 17,000 in Anatolia.

The Timar was the smallest unit of land held by a sipahi, providing a yearly revenue of no more than 20,000 akçe, which was between two and four times what a teacher earned. A ziamet was a larger unit of land, yielding up to 100,000 akçe, and was owned by Sipahis of officer rank. A has was the largest unit of land, giving revenues of more than 100,000 akçe, and was only held by the highest-ranking members of the military. The land tenure was also known as Turkish: sipahilik. The Timarli sipahi was obliged to provide the army with an armed retainer called (cebelu) if his income was over 3040 akçes. Sipahis who had an income of 50,762 akçes were obligated to bring 10 cebelus, a tent, a smaller tent, and horse barding. Many sipahis would bring more cebelus than they were strictly obligated to provide, in hopes of gaining favor. However, toward the end of the 16th century, as the value of currency, and consequently the fixed value of timars, declined due to a financial and economic crisis. The cebelu (meaning "armored person") were expected to be mounted and fully equipped as the sipahi themselves; they were usually sons, brothers or nephews and their position was probably more similar to squires than men-at-arms.

In wartime, Timarli sipahis and their retainers were gathered under their alay (regiment) beys, alay-beys gathered with their troops under sanjakbeys, and sanjakbeys gathered under beylerbeys. If a battle was to be fought in Europe, Rumelian (Balkan) Sipahis took the honorary right flank under the Rumelian beylerbey, while the Anatolian beylerbey and his Sipahis took the left flank; when a battle was in Asia, positions were switched. This way, the Ottoman classical army's flanks wholly consisted of Timariot cavalry, while the center consisted of Janissary infantry and artillery divisions. The equipment and tactics of the Rumelians and Anatolians were similar. An average sipahi cavalryman would be equipped with a helmet, aventail, armor covering his upper body and lower body, a composite bow carried in a bowcase slung on the left hip, arrows carried in a quiver slung on the right hip, a sabre, a blunt weapon, a dagger, a shield, a spear, and horse barding for the wealthier soldiers.

Timarli Sipahis of the classical Ottoman period usually comprised the bulk of the army and did the majority of the fighting on the battlefield. While infantry troops at the army's center maintained a static battle line, the cavalry flanks constituted its mobile striking arm. During battle, Timarli Sipahi tactics were used, opening the conflict with skirmishes and localized skirmishes with enemy cavalry. Regiments of Timarli Sipahis made charges against weaker or isolated units and retreated back to the main body of troops whenever confronted with heavy cavalry. During one regiment's retreat, other regiments of sipahis could charge the chasing enemy's flanks. Such tactics served to draw enemy cavalry away from infantry support, break their cohesion, and isolate and overwhelm them with numerical superiority. Sipahis had the ability to harass and provoke opposing troops with arrows. Sipahis, like every other cavalryman in the Ottoman Empire, also conducted the parthian shot when retreating. All cavalry flanks of the Ottoman army fought a fluid, mounted type of warfare around the center of the army, which served as a stable pivot.

== Kapikulu Sipahis ==
The Kapıkulu Cavalry, also known as "Sipahis of the Porte", were household cavalry troops of the Ottoman Palace. They were the cavalry equivalent of the Janissary household infantry force. There were six divisions of Kapıkulu cavalry: Kapıkulu Sipahis, Silahdars, Right Ulufecis, Left Ulufecis, Right Garips, and Left Garips. All of them were paid quarterly salaries, while the Sipahis and Silahtars were elite units.

== Rivalry with the Janissary corps ==
Since Kapikulu Sipahis were a cavalry regiment, it was well known within the Ottoman military circles that they considered themselves a superior stock of soldiers than Janissaries, who were sons of Christian peasants from the Balkans (Rumelia), and were officially slaves bounded by various laws of the devşirme.

They made great strides of efforts to gain respect within the Ottoman Empire and their political reputation depended on the mistakes of the Janissary. That minor quarrels erupted between the two units is made evident with a Turkmen adage, still used today within Turkey, "Atlı er başkaldırmaz", which, referring to the unruly Janissaries, translates into "Horsemen don't mutiny".

Towards the middle of the 16th century, the Janissaries had started to gain more importance in the army, though the Sipahis remained an important factor in the empire's bureaucracy, economy, and politics, and a crucial aspect of disciplined leadership within the army. As late as the 17th century, the Sipahis were, together with their rivals the Janissaries, the de facto rulers in the early years of Sultan Murad IV's reign. In 1826, after an evident Janissary revolt the Sipahis played an important part in the disbandment of the Janissary corps. The Sultan received critical assistance from the loyalist Sipahi cavalry in order to forcefully dismiss the infuriated Janissaries.

Two years later, however, they shared a similar fate when Sultan Mahmud II revoked their privileges and dismissed them in favor of a more modern military structure. Unlike the Janissaries before them they retired honorably, peacefully, and without bloodshed into new Ottoman cavalry divisions who followed modern military tradition doctrines. Older sipahis were allowed to retire and keep their tımar lands until they died, and younger sipahis joined the Asakir-i Mansure-i Muhammediye army as cavalry.

== Notable individuals ==
- Ulubatlı Hasan (1428–1453), timariot
- Yakup Ağa, father of Hayreddin Barbarossa

== Legacy ==
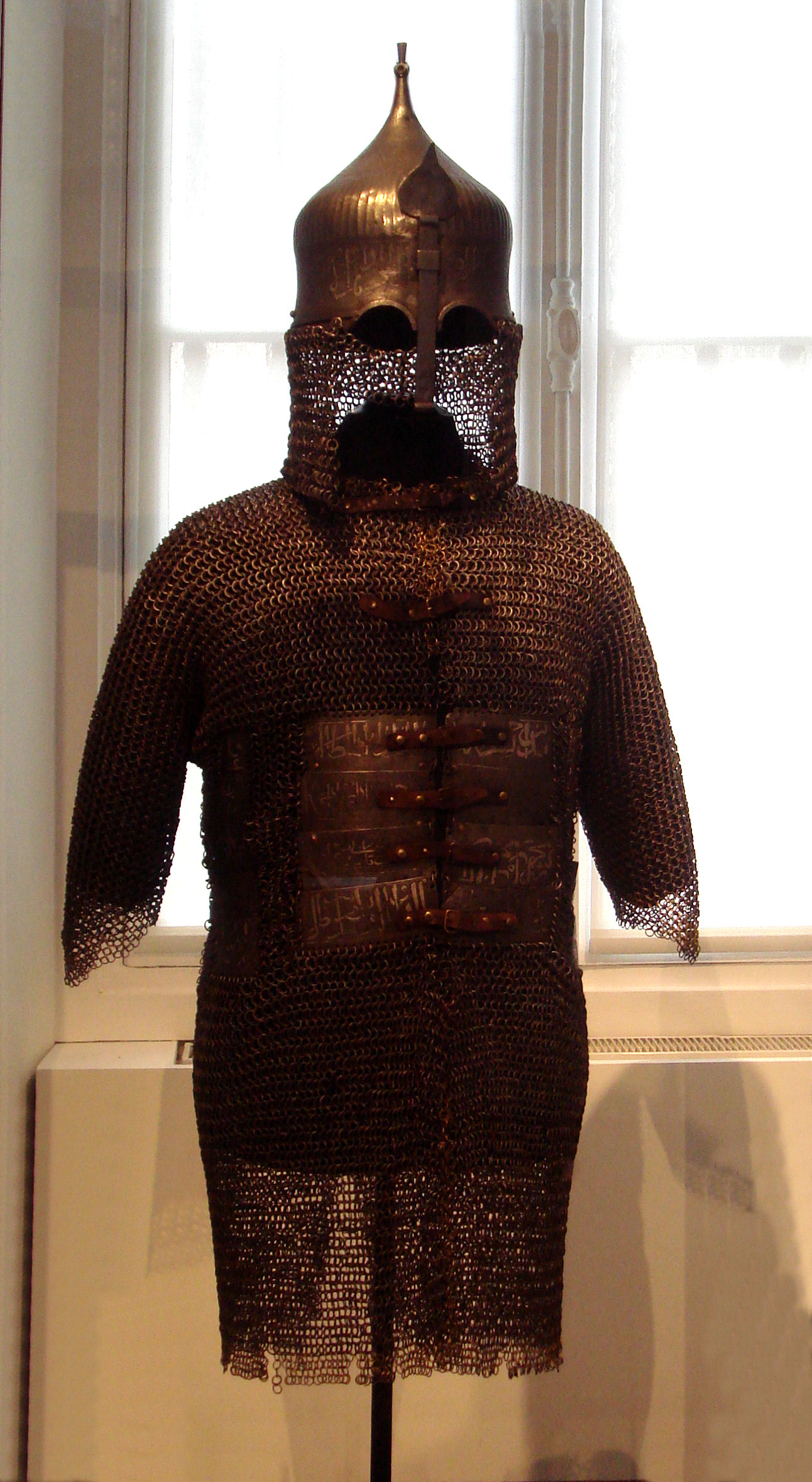
Timariot armour dating to 1480–1500

The French army adopted the term Spahi for several cavalry units in colonial armies in the 19th and 20th centuries.

=== In popular culture ===
Video games

- Sipahis appear in Creative Assembly's Empire: Total War as a heavy cavalry unit employed by the Ottoman Empire and other Muslim factions. They also are employed by the Hindu Maratha Empire. Also in Napoleon: Total War to the Ottomans as the second greatest lancer unit, second to another Ottoman unit, the Silahtar Guard.
- Sipahis appear in Age of Empires franchise, Age of Empires III and Age of Empires IV as a heavy cavalry unit unique to the Ottoman Empire.
- Sipahis are employed by the "Turks" faction in Medieval: Total War coming into the game during the late era (post 1325) existing as both the regular, lightly armored Ottoman Sipahi melee cavalry and as the Sipahi of the Porte unit which is an elite, extremely heavily armored cavalry archer with excellent melee capability as well as the royal bodyguard of the Turk faction starting in the late era, replacing the standard of the three Muslim factions, the Ghulam Cavalry.
- Sipahis are also employed by the Ottoman Empire in Medieval II: Total War in three different forms: Sipahis, mounted archers; Sipahi Lancers, heavy cavalry; and Dismounted Sipahi Lancers, dragoons.
- Sipah is cavalry unit unique to Turkey in Cossacks: European Wars series computer games developed by GSC Game World.
- The Sipahi is the unique unit for the Ottoman Empire in the computer games Civilization III and Civilization V (where the game itself was made by Firaxis Games); the other unique unit is the Janissary.
- In the video game Assassin's Creed: Revelations, the player can obtain a set of "Sepahi Riding Armor" for the protagonist.

Other

- In the historical novels Eight Pointed Cross (2011), Falcon's Shadow (2020) and Ash Fall (2022) by Marthese Fenech, the character Timurhan is a prominent Sipahi in the Ottoman imperial cavalry
- In the book The Count of Monte Cristo by Alexandre Dumas, one of the characters sells himself into the service of the Spahis in North Africa.
- The title character of the 1937 film "Lady Killer", played by Jean Gabin, is a Spahi.

== See also ==
- Italian Spahis
- Akinji, irregular military scouts of Ottoman Empire
- Azeb, irregular soldiers of unmarried youths, serving in various roles in the early Ottoman army
- Janissary, elite infantry units that formed the Ottoman sultan's household troops

== Annotations ==
1. The word is derived from Persian: سپاهی sipâhi and means "soldier". It is also transliterated as spahi and spahee; rendered in other languages as: spahiu in Albanian and Romanian, sepuh (սեպուհ) in Armenian, spahis (Σπαχής) in Greek, spahija or spahiya in Serbo-Croatian, Bulgarian, and Macedonian (Cyrillic: спахија, спахия).

== Sources ==
- Shaw, Stanford J. (1976). History of the Ottoman Empire and Modern Turkey. Vol. 1. Cambridge: Cambridge University Press. ISBN 0-521-29163-1.
- Worringer, Renée (2021). A Short History of the Ottoman Empire. University of Toronto Press. ISBN 978-1-4426-0043-0.
