= Ihtisab =

Tax on merchants in the Ottoman Empire

Ihtisab, or ihtisap was a type of tax on markets in the Ottoman Empire; the muhtasib or ihtisap ağasi - the ihtisab collector - had a broader role in regulating and taxing markets under the authority of the kadı.

The ihtisab seems to mainly have been a "daily opening tax", where Shopkeepers would pay each day their shop was open (paying nothing if their shop was closed). It was seen as a source of substantial income; people would "buy" the position of ihtisap ağasi from the bey, in order to collect the market tax. This was a form of tax farming, parallel to iltizam and the earlier establishment of feudal monopolies to collect revenue from other economic activity, such as salt production. Hence the only people who became muhtasibs were those who could afford to buy their way into the sinecure.

In the later empire, damga resmi (a charge on hallmarks, and stamp duty) was considered to be part of ihtisab. In the early 19th century, before the tanzimat reforms, the difficulty of enforcing ihtisab led the Ottoman government to establish a series of monopolies, called ved-i vahit, to ease collection

Ihtisab was eventually replaced by temettu vergisi, a tax on merchants' profits, which was introduced as part of the tanzimat-era tax reforms in 1839. Mahmut II aimed to create a fairer system of taxes based on ability to pay, and which was based on an extensive census across the empire in the 1830s. The new taxes were first introduced in Bursa and Gallipoli before rollout across the rest of the empire; temettu vergisi was enforced by muhassils, who were salaried government officers rather than feudal lords, although the title ihtisap ağasi was retained; their role in the regulation of commerce evolved into that of a municipal official.
