= Tuz resmi =

The Tuz resmi (Ottoman Turkish: طوز رسمی; "salt tax") was a tax on salt in the Ottoman Empire.

During the 15th century, households working in the salt industry were exempted from taxes such as avariz, in return for their contributions to tuz resmi. In one case, an entire village involved in salt-production was exempted from the jizya, avariz-i divaniye and tekalif-i orfiye taxes.

An emin could play a key role in salt taxation; most of the surviving records of the emin stationed in Ragusa (who handled customs and tariffs on foreign trade) are receipts for salt duty. There were even dedicated salt-duty officers, who were granted the title tuz emini.

Tuz resmi was usually arranged through the muqata'ah system; the government would grant a salt-producing resource to a contractor or tax-farmer, who would then be obliged to return a proportion of salt production (or the cash equivalent) to government coffers. There was usually a separate muqata'ah for each salt-mine. During the Tanzimat reforms, the Ottoman government took over complete control of salt production, and prices were fixed; in 1879, the salt industry was given to bankers as collateral against government borrowing, and then in 1881, it was made part of the Regie Company which gave all salt revenues to the Public Debt Commission – in an attempt to help pay off the Ottoman government's foreign debts. In the face of this government control of salt production (and of salt prices), smuggling became a problem.

In the later 19th century, government revenue from tuz resmi was typically 70-80 million kurus per year; by 1912 revenue had risen to 130,476,788 kurus – much higher than other tariffs such as the muskirat resmi (alcohol tax) or the damga resmi (stamp duty), although taxes on land and crops continued to return more revenue.
