= Resm-i mücerred =

Bachelor tax in the Ottoman Empire

The resm-i mücerred was a bachelor tax in the Ottoman Empire, related to the resm-i çift and the resm-i bennâk.

The amount payable varied from year to year and from region to region, but the tax was payable annually, in March, to the timar holder (nominally a sipahi) or to the tax-farmer (iltizam). However, a muafname (tax exemption) might excuse a person, or a village, or an entire social group from paying resm-i mücerred and related taxes; alternatively, örfi taxes might be lifted from a community but they would still have to pay resm-i mücerred.

Resm-i mücerred was paid by landless poor or unmarried peasants who did not have sufficient resources to qualify for the resm-i çift and the resm-i bennâk land-taxes - whose names, taken literally, refer to one "çift" of land, and a half-çift, respectively. This structure may have been directly inherited from the Byzantine system of land taxes, in areas which were conquered by the Ottomans.

One 19th-century tahrir, from a group of villages in a district which is now in Iran, set çift resmi at 50 akçes, bennak resmi at 18 akçes, caba resmi (for farmers who rented rather than owned land) was 12 akçes, and mücerred resmi was valued at only 6 akçes; in this case, the tahrir set aside tax revenue from the villages to support a local charitable foundation (or trust), rather than returning it directly to the state. Comparison of different tax records suggests that the ratio between tax rates for bachelors and for established farmers may have narrowed over time.

Tax records show that mücerred were more likely to migrate to other areas; they had fewer ties to the land, and may have been more vulnerable. Migrant mücerred were more likely to make their way to a growing town; some may have moved locally, but a few would travel to Istanbul from a distant district.

== See also ==
Bachelor tax
