= Mülk =

Ottoman land holding type

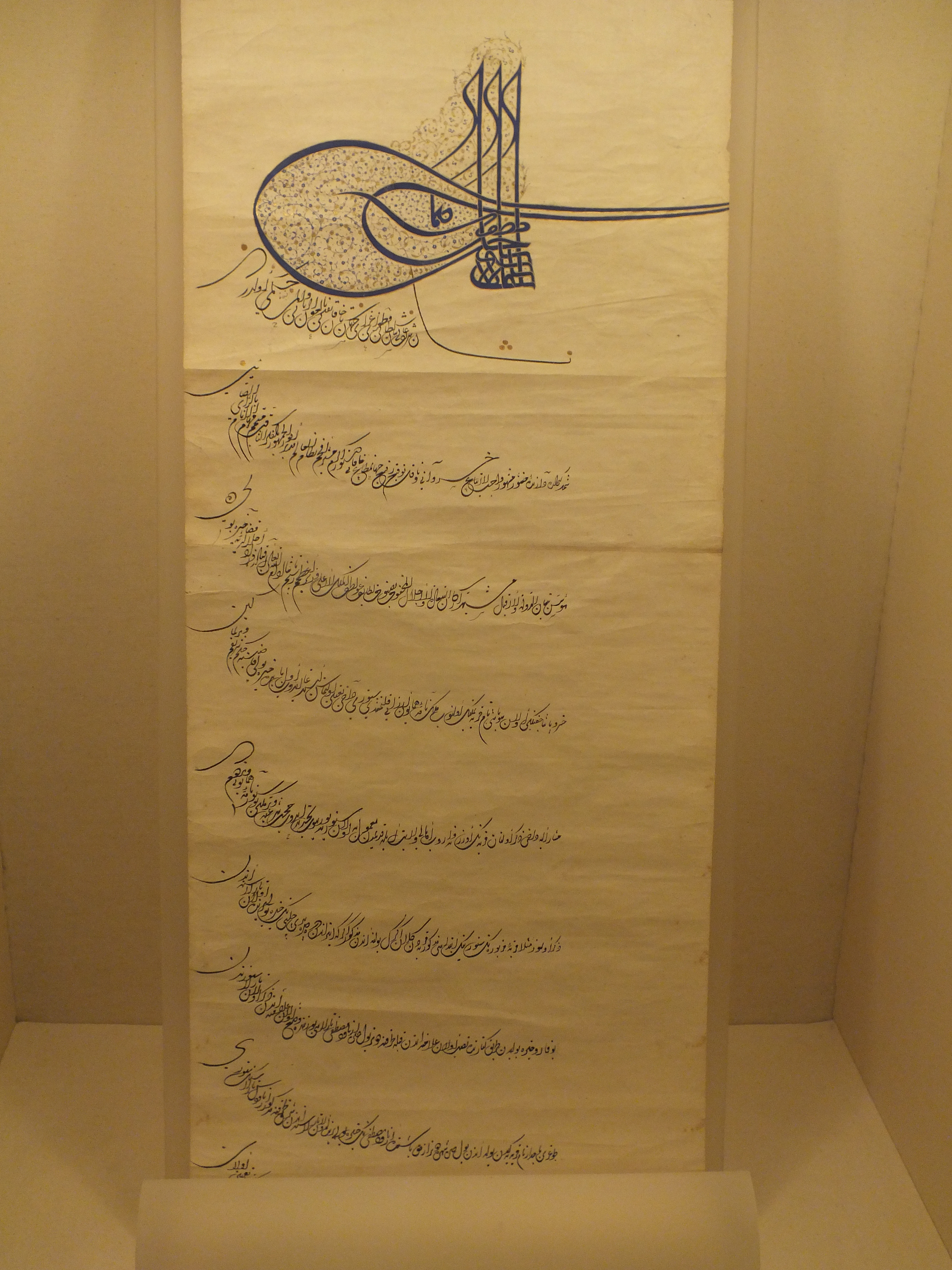
A sinirname for the village of Subasi, in Hayrabolu district, in eastern Thrace; which was mülk (freehold) land belonging to Rustem Pasha. The top of the sinirname is signed with the imperial tughra.

Mülk was a form of land holding in the Ottoman Empire.

== Characteristics of mülk ==
Mülk was similar to freehold land; owners could buy, sell, and mortgage freely. It was exempt from some kinds of land taxes. Mülk was about more than just the land; it might also include the right to annual malikane payments from tenants and farmers.

== History ==
The term mülk has its origins in Arabic and was historically significant in the context of property and land ownership, particularly in the Islamic world. During the Ottoman Empire, mülk specifically referred to privately owned land, distinct from other forms such as miri (state land) and vakıf (land dedicated to religious endowments). The concept of mülk played a key role in the Ottoman land tenure system, influencing how wealth and power were distributed across different societal classes.

In the Ottoman Empire, private ownership of land was relatively rare. Most land was considered miri and belonged to the state, which allowed the sultan to exert control over agricultural production and taxation. However, some landowners—often elites—held mülk lands, giving them full rights over their property, including the ability to sell, bequeath, or transfer it. This created a distinct class of wealthy landowners with significant economic and political influence.

Following the decline of the Ottoman Empire and the establishment of the Turkish Republic in 1923, the legal and administrative structures surrounding property rights evolved. The mülk system, while no longer central to land management, remains an important legal concept in modern Turkey, where it still signifies property ownership.

Additionally, the legacy of mülk survives in institutions such as Mülkiye, which refers to the Faculty of Political Science at Ankara University. This institution, originally established to train Ottoman civil servants, continues to symbolize the state's administration and governance of land and resources

== Context ==
In much of the Near East, mülk can be contrasted against miri, which was effectively state-controlled land (perhaps a former mülk forfeited to the state when the owner had no heir to pass it on to).

In some ways, mülk was similar to waqf property.

== See also ==
- çiftlik
- Iltizam
- Tapu resmi
- Sinirname
- Malikane
- Miri
- mawat: Dead land, or wilderness.
