= Adet =

Adet may refer to:

== Turkish-language words ==
- Adet, Turkish for a numerical quantity
- Âdet, Turkish word which could refer to:

- Ritual, structured sequence of actions
- Menstruation, discharge of the uterine lining

== People ==
- Pierre Adet, French scientist, politician, and diplomat
- Adet Lin, Chinese-American novelist and translator

== Other uses ==
- ADET, football club based in Talnique, El Salvador
- Yilmana Densa, woreda in Amhara Region, Ethiopia formerly known as "Adet"
  - Adet, Ethiopia, town in Amhara Region, Ethiopia, and the largest town in the woreda

== See also ==
- Naeder Adet, woreda in Tigray Region, Ethiopia
- Two taxes in the Ottoman Empire:

- Adet-i ağnam, on sheep and goats
- Adet-i deştbani, penalty for crop damage
