= Dahieh =

Suburb south of Beirut, Lebanon

Dahieh الضاحية الجنوبية
- Location in Lebanon
- Coordinates: 33.85°N 35.51°E
- Country: Lebanon
- Governorate: Mount Lebanon
- District: Baabda

Area
  - Total: 15.63 km^{2} (6.03 sq mi)
- Elevation: 50 m (160 ft)

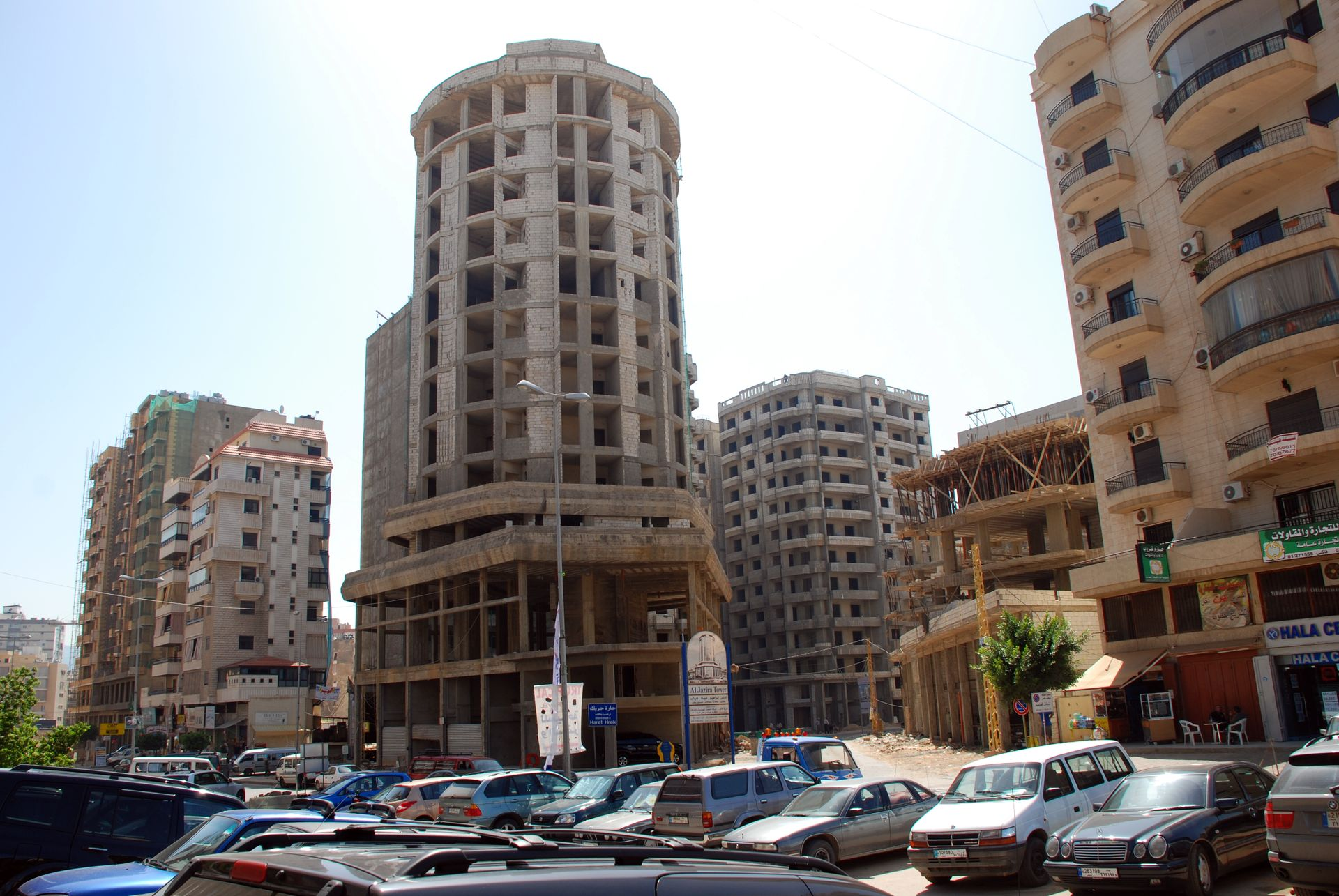
The Haret Hreik suburb of Dahieh in 2009

Dahieh (Arabic: الضاحية الجنوبية, lit. 'the southern suburb', French: Banlieue Sud de Beyrouth, Dâhiye de Beyrouth) is a predominantly Shia Muslim suburb in the south of Beirut, in the Baabda District of Lebanon. It has a minority of Sunni Muslims, Christians, and a Palestinian refugee camp with 20,000 inhabitants. It is a residential and commercial area with malls, stores and souks, and comprises several towns and municipalities, including Ghobeiry, Haret Hreik, Bourj el-Barajneh, Ouzai, and Hay El-Saloum. It is north of Rafic Hariri International Airport, and the M51 freeway that links Beirut to the airport passes through it.

Dahieh is the Beirut stronghold of Lebanese political party and paramilitary group Hezbollah, and it had large auditoria in Haret Hreik, Hadath and Bourj el-Barajneh, where Hezbollah followers gathered on special occasions. The area was severely bombed by Israel in the 2006 Lebanon War and in the Israel–Hezbollah conflict (2023–present). Hassan Nasrallah, the Secretary-General of Hezbollah, was killed in an Israeli airstrike in 2024.

== Demographics ==
Dahieh is home to one of the most densely populated communities in Lebanon. In 1986 the number of Shia living in Dahieh was estimated to be 800,000.

== History ==
In the 14th century, there was a sizeable Shia Muslim community at Bourj Beirut. The community was first mentioned in a decree that the Mamluk viceroy issued against the Shiites of Beirut and the surrounding areas in 1363, demanding that they stop practicing Shia rituals. In Ottoman tapu tahrir tax records of 1545, Bourj had a population of 169 households, 11 bachelors and one imam, all Shia Muslims. Shia of Bourj were also identified in al-Duwayhi's writings in 1661, and the town was then known as Burj Beirut (lit. "the tower of Beirut").

Prior to the start of the Lebanese Civil War in 1975, Dahieh was one of the increasingly urbanized rural settlements outside of Beirut, with a mixed community of Christians and Shia Muslims. From 1920 to 1943 many Shia moved to Dahieh from Southern Lebanon and Beqaa Valley, where the French mandate cracked down on Shiite anti-French rebels in June 1920. More Shiites arrived in the early 1960s escaping financial hardship and state neglect of the countryside. By the start of 1975, 45% of Lebanese Shiites were living in Greater Beirut.

Dahieh's population further increased during the war. By 1976, around 100,000 Shia had been displaced from the East Beirut canton following sectarian violence in the Black Saturday and Karantina massacres. Ayatollah Mohammad Hussein Fadlallah was among them. Most of the newcomers were destitute, leading to solidarity and self-reliance. More Shiites arrived in Dahieh following the 1978 and 1982 Lebanon War. Unwilling to live under the Israeli South Lebanon security belt administration, more Shiites moved out of their villages to Beirut. By 1986, an estimated 800,000 Shias were living in Dahieh, constituting the majority of Shia in Lebanon.

=== 2006 Lebanon war ===
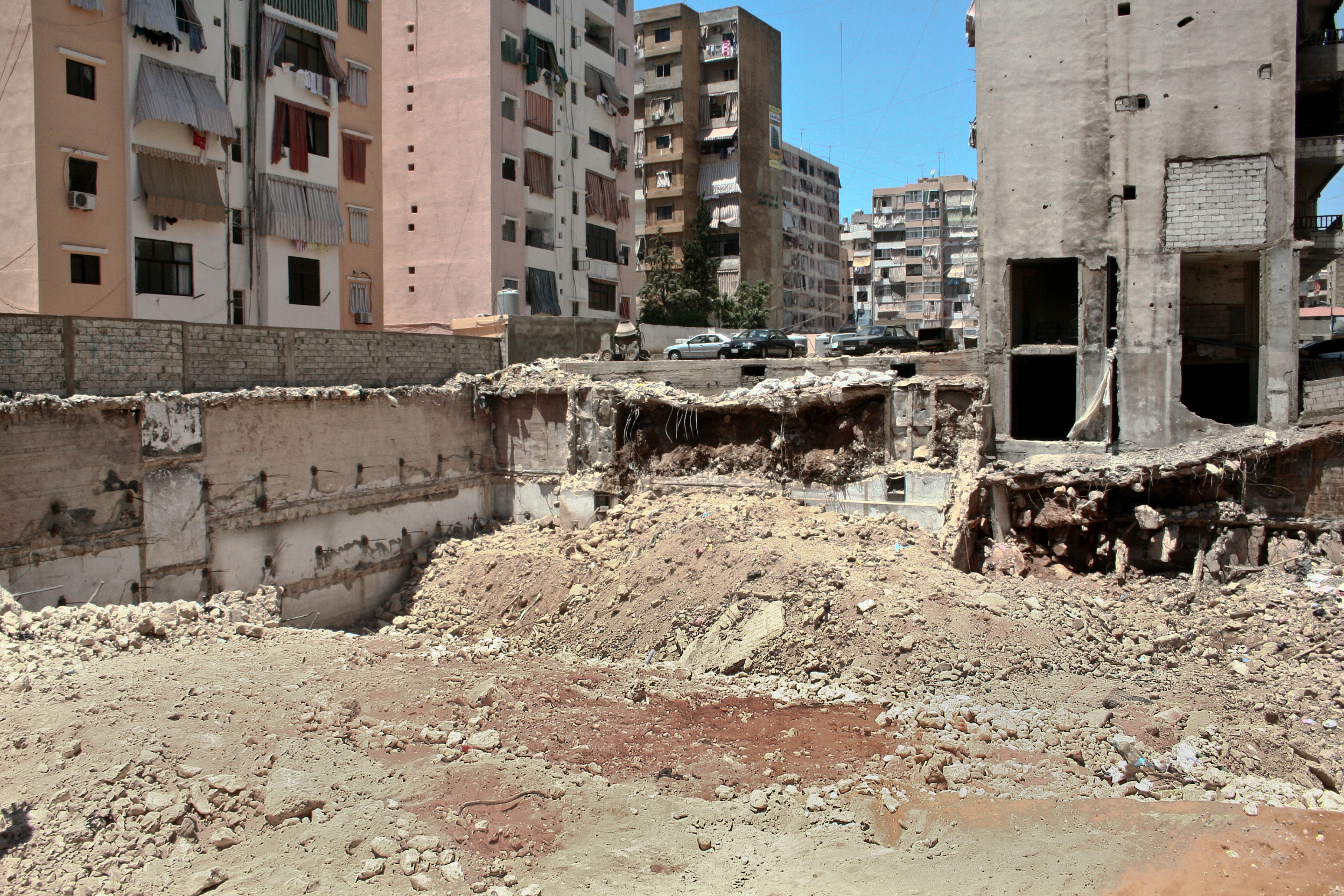
A crater in Dahieh in 2008, two years after the 2006 Lebanon War

Hezbollah's television station, Al-Manar, was targeted in the area.

Hours after the 14 August 2006, ceasefire, Hezbollah pledged to reconstruct houses for the residents of Dahieh, and offered rent money for the period in which they were being built.

On 22 September 2006, Hezbollah's leader Hassan Nasrallah attended a mass rally in Dahieh declaring a "Divine Victory" against Israel. Apart from mentioning Hezbollah having 20,000 rockets at its disposal, he also went on to criticize Lebanon's central government, stating it should step down and form a unity government. According to the Hezbollah's "Jihad al-Bina' " association, the reconstruction of Dahieh started from 25 May 2007, the day of the anniversary of the 2000 Israeli pullout from Lebanon.

=== 2013 bombings ===
On 9 July 2013, 53 people were wounded after a bomb exploded in a busy shopping street in the suburb; the blast came on a busy shopping day on the eve of the holy Muslim month of Ramadan. A faction of the Free Syrian Army (FSA) claimed responsibility; however, FSA spokesman Luay Miqdad condemned the attack, as well as another attack the following month.

On 16 August 2013, a month after the first bomb, another car bomb blast hit the suburb. At least 21 people were killed and 200 injured in the massive explosion, the majority of whom children. A group linked to the Syrian opposition calling itself the "Brigade of Aisha" claimed responsibility for the attack.

=== 2024 airstrikes ===
On 27 September 2024, Israel launched airstrikes on the suburb, which led to the assassination of Hassan Nasrallah as part of the attack, as confirmed on the following day.

=== 2026 airstrikes ===
An Israeli airstrike led to two fatalities on 27 March 2026 in the residential area of Tahwitat al-Ghadir.

== See also ==
- Dahiya doctrine, a military strategy of asymmetric warfare, which encompasses the destruction of the civilian infrastructure and endorses the employment of disproportionate force
- War crimes in the 2006 Lebanon War
