= Resm-i bennâk =

Ottoman Empire tax on landless peasants

The resm-i bennâk was a tax on peasants who had little or no land - those who did not pay the resm-i çift - in the Ottoman Empire.

The name is probably a loanword of Armenian origin; in the Ottoman Empire, "bennâk" came to mean a landless peasant, or a man who had married but not yet established his own household. "Bennâk" was also a term for a small area of farmland, less than half a çift.

The resm-i bennâk was usually paid annually, on 1 March, by the head of a family who is either landless or has very little land - not enough to be assessed for resm-i çift. The tax was payable to the timar-holder or to a tax-farmer in their stead.

The rate of resm-i bennâk was generally lower than the resm-i çift. For instance, in the provincial tax code of Hüdavendigar in 1487, a married man with his own farm might pay the full resm-i çift rate of 40 akçes; a bennâk would pay 12 akçes, and a mücerred (bachelor) would pay 6 akçes (see also resm-i mücerred).

In some cases, bennâk was only paid by peasants in the Ottoman Empire who had a small but nonzero area of land to farm; the truly landless peasants would pay a caba tax in which case the remaining bennak might be called "ekinlü-bennâk".

Academics might be exempted. Miners were also exempted from many taxes, and the resm-i bennâk was no exemption - for example, sipahis who worked in saltpetre mines would be exempt from resm-i bennâk, resm-i çift, and caba; they would also be exempted from avariz and other taxes. Some of the sadat - those claiming descent from Muhammed - were initially exempted from paying resm-i bennâk, but this exemption was eroded over time. There were even cases of people forging certificates of ancestry in order to claim tax exemptions.
