= Resm-i hınzır =

The resm-i hınzır ("Pig tax") was a tax on pigs in the Ottoman Empire.

Although pork was theoretically banned in the Ottoman Empire, some trade continued - alongside trade in alcohol. One fatwa specifically claimed the resm-i hınzır (along with the resm-i arusane, a bride tax) should end; but the trade, and the tax on it, continued regardless - occasionally disguised as "gifts".
