= Sürsat =

Sürsat was a form of food requisitioning with price controls, used by the Ottoman Empire to provide consumables for its armed forces. It was related to nüzül; sürsat was initially an obligation for the public to provide food and other supplies at a pre-fixed price which was unlikely to be favourable, or might even be merely symbolic. Istira was basically the same obligation, but supposedly at market price. Over time, nüzül, sürsat, and istira were all transformed into extraordinary cash taxes on people living near the route travelled by the army.

During the late 17th and early 18th century - a period of continuous warfare for the Ottoman Empire - these extraordinary taxes soon became routine.

This cash payment would be higher than the market value of the goods that were nominally required; for instance, during the campaigns on the eastern frontier in 1637-1638, the market price of barley was 23 akçes per kile; but under the sürsat system, villagers were obliged to sell barley to the army for 12 akçes - and those who did not sell barley directly paid cash instead, varying from 20 to 60 akçes. The easy convertibility of food supply obligations to cash payments makes it clear that sürsat was effectively a tax.

When goods were provided rather than cash, they might also include firewood and food for horses, as well as food for the army itself. The raya would be obliged to deliver supplies to where they were needed - in other words, they bore the transportation costs, which would otherwise be a large part of the cost of maintaining an army in the field.

Ottoman taxation was subject to a complex family of overlapping fees and exemptions; some favoured groups were exempt from sürsat, and in the Balkans many Christian settlements were exempted from sürsat, apparently to discourage rebellion during warfare with neighbouring Christian kingdoms.
