= Muhasil =

Ottoman tax collector title

Muhasil (Turkish: muhassıl) was a title in the administration of the Ottoman Empire, for an official in charge of finance and taxes in the sanjak (second-level administrative unit), and also in some cases an official in charge of the collection of a specific tax (dubbed "tax farmer").

== Types ==
- Provincial muhasil (muhassil-i emval): appointed by the Porte to assess and collect taxes in the sanjak on behalf of the Imperial treasury. The Sultan came to confer the title to the Pasha of the Sanjak, as a tenure-long duty and right.
- Tax farming (iltizām): the tax farm of a muqata'ah (land parcel) was issued to the highest bidder, the mīrī (state-controlled land) tax collection was entrusted to the mültezim (holder of iltizām) who was referred to as muhassıl.
