= Tapu resmi =

The tapu resmi was a feudal land tax in the Ottoman Empire.

A tapu was the equivalent of a title deed for farmland, in a feudal system where farmers were proprietors rather than outright owners; this would be recorded in a tapu tahrir, a survey of land ownership and land grants which the Ottoman government used to update land-tax records, and which are now valuable to historians. Not all land was subject to the tapu system; iltizam tax-farming was more commonly applied to non-tapu land. A prominent 16th-century legal theorist argued that tapu resmi was contrary to shari'ah law, and was effectively a bribe; however, tapu resmi continued to be used across the Ottoman Empire.

Tapu resmi was a divani tax on these land titles, payable to the timar holder. Because land inherited land was subject to a change of title, tapu resmi could also be seen as an inheritance tax; but the tapu resmi fee was payable on other transfers too, including when farmland fell vacant because a tenant farmer died or left. After paying tapu resmi, a farmer would still have to pay resm-i çift (or an equivalent tax) each year.

Land which was newly brought under cultivation, such as ifrazat, would be exempt from tapu resmi until the next tahrir (survey).

In 1716, a kanunname (tax code) for the vilayet of Morea set a sliding scale of tapuu resmi fees, from 20 akçes for low-quality land to 60 akçes for high-quality land; this was categorised as a bad-i hava tax, along with adet-i deştbani.

The tapu system was partially reformed during the tanzimat; including increased gender equality, so that women could work or rent out farmland; the responsibility for collecting the tapu resmi passed to dedicated treasury officers rather than feudal lords, and documents were standardised in the 1840s.
