= Tamga =

Symbol branding culture of Eurasian nomads

Tamgha of the Bayundur, which represents a falcon according to Mahmud al-Kashgari

A tamga, or tamgha (Old Turkic: 𐱃𐰢𐰍𐰀, lit. 'stamp, seal'; Mongolian: Тамга, ᠲᠠᠮᠠᠭ᠎ᠠ; Adyghe: тамыгъэ) is an abstract seal or brand that was used by Eurasian nomads and cultures influenced by them, initially as a livestock branding. The tamga was used as a livestock branding for a particular tribe, clan or family. They were common among the Eurasian nomads throughout Classical Antiquity and the Middle Ages. Beyond livestock branding, tamgas served as dynastic and state symbols on coinage, architectural inscriptions, and official seals. The Khazar Khagan adopted a bident tamga as a dynastic emblem, which was later appropriated by the Rurikid dynasty of Kievan Rus', appearing on coins minted by Vladimir the Great and Yaroslav the Wise. Among the Mongols, tamgas were used as administrative stamps on official documents, giving rise to the Persian and Turkish word "damgha" meaning customs duty or tax seal, from which the English word "tammage" derives. In the Caucasus, the term was borrowed into Adyghe and Kabardian languages where it still denotes clan identity markers. As clan and family identifiers, the collection and systematic comparison of tamgas is regarded to provide insights into relations between families, individuals and ethnic groups in the steppe territory.

Similar tamga-like symbols were sometimes adopted by sedentary peoples adjacent to the Pontic–Caspian steppe both in Eastern Europe and Central Asia. Branding of livestock was a common practice across most sedentary populations, as far back as the ancient Egyptians. Among the Circassians, most families maintain a tamga to this day, and the customs related to tamga are integrated into Adyghe Khabze.

It has been speculated that Turkic tamgas represent one of the sources of the Old Turkic script of the 6th–10th centuries, but since the mid-20th century, this hypothesis is widely rejected as being unverifiable.

== Tamgas in the steppe tradition ==
=== Ancient origins ===
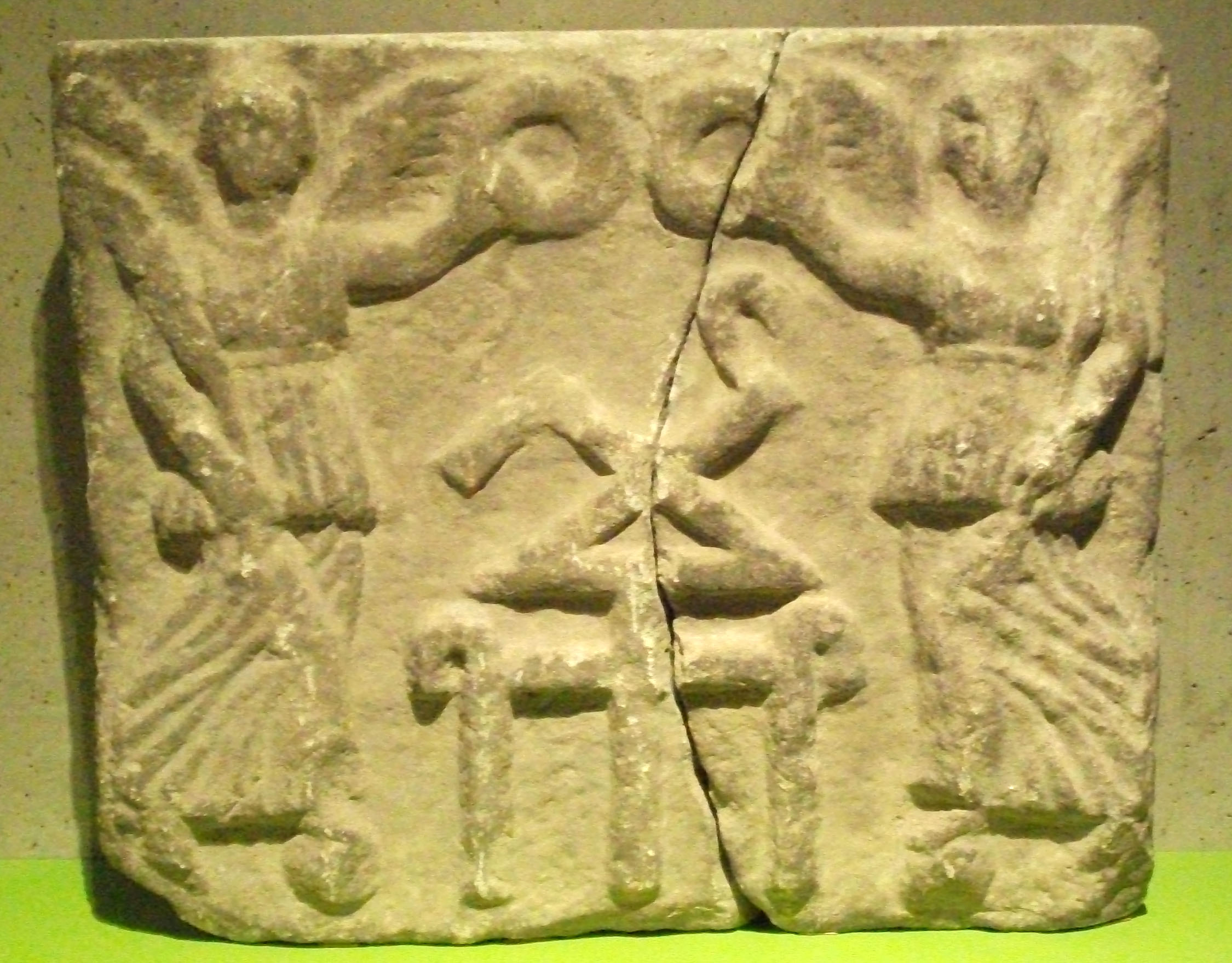
Tamga of the Bosporan king Tiberius Julius Eupator, crowned by two winged victories. The relief dates to the second century.

Tamgas originate in prehistoric times, but their exact usage and development cannot be continuously traced over time. There are, however, symbols represented in rock art that are referred to as tamgas or tamga-like. If they serve to record the presence of individuals at a particular place, they may be functionally equivalent to medieval tamgas.

In the later phases of the Bosporan Kingdom of the Crimea, the ruling dynasty applied personal tamgas, composed of a fragment representing the family and a fragment representing the individual king, apparently in continuation of steppe traditions and in an attempt to consolidate sedentary and nomadic factions within the kingdom.

=== Hunnic empires ===
Several tamgas belonging to Hunnic peoples are known. They were sometimes countermarked on their coinage during their periods of imperial rule.

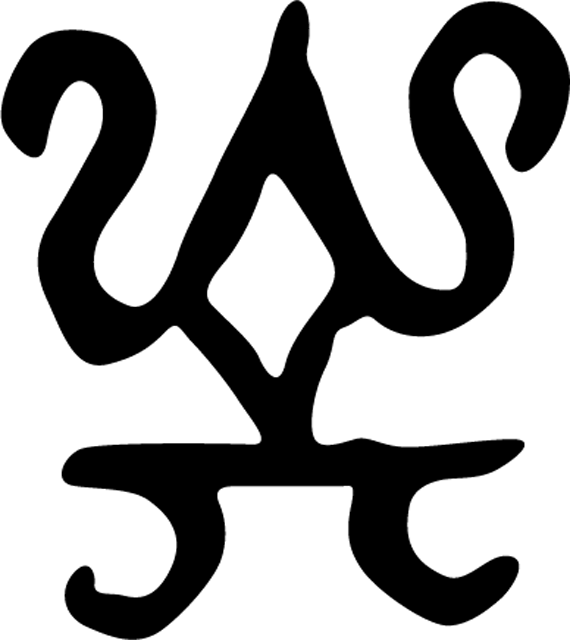
Tamga of the Kidarites that ruled parts of central Asia circa 320–467.

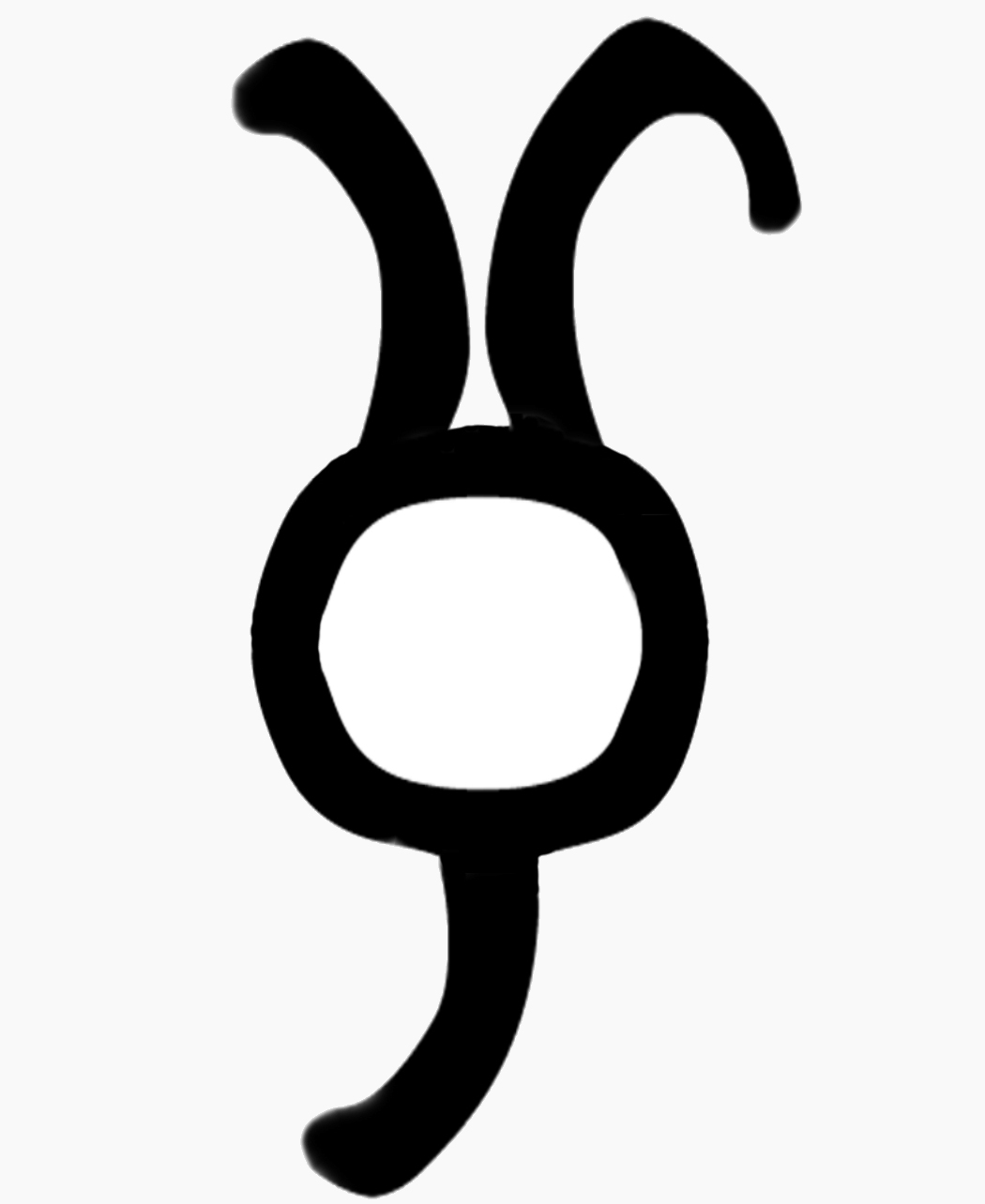
Tamga of the Imperial Hephthalites that ruled parts of central Asia circa 440–560.

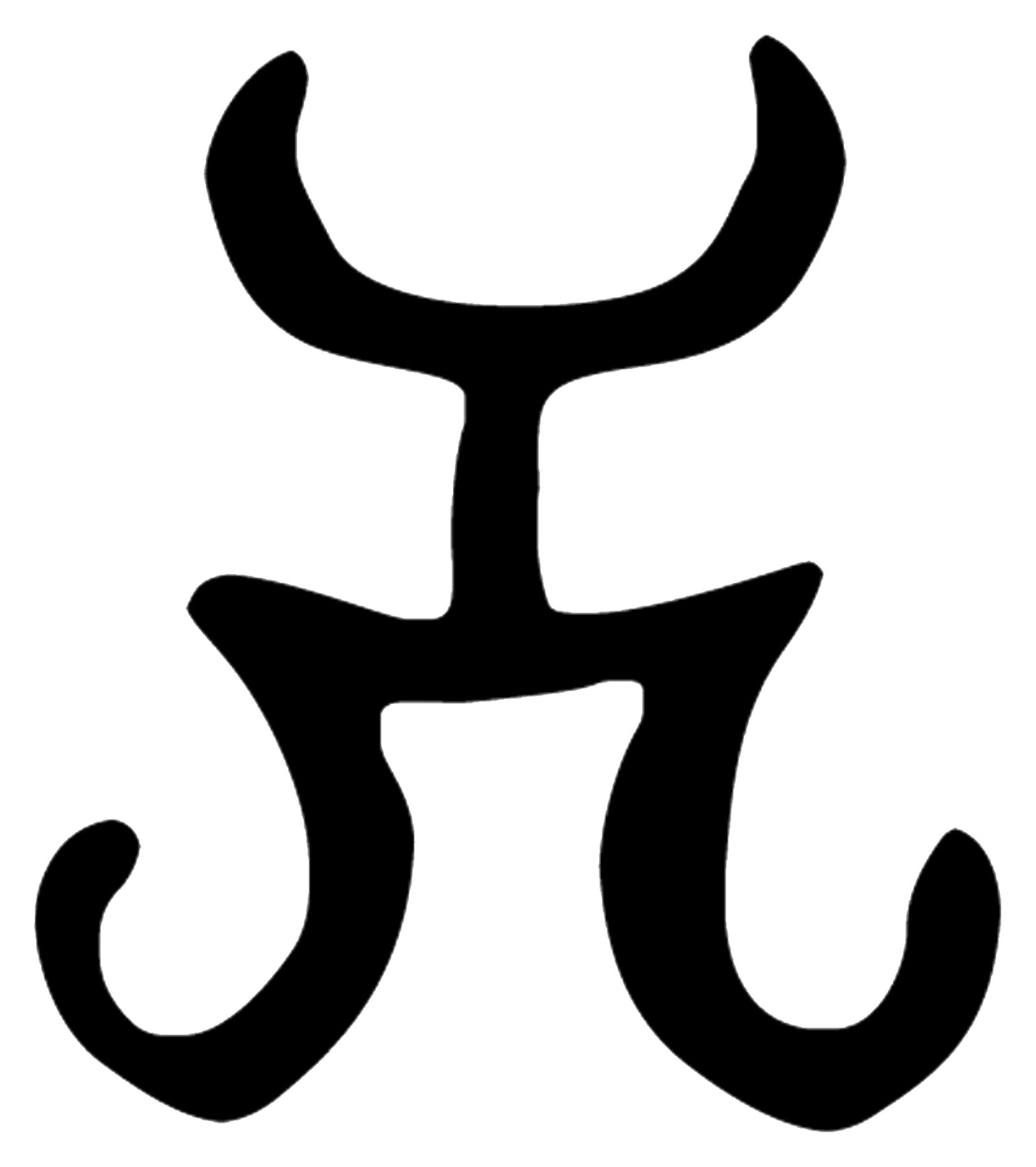
Tamga of the Alchon Huns that ruled parts of central Asia and later northern India circa 370–670.

=== Turkic peoples ===
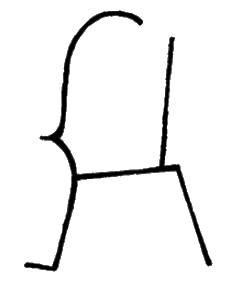
Tamga of the Ashina clan of the First Turkic Khaganate

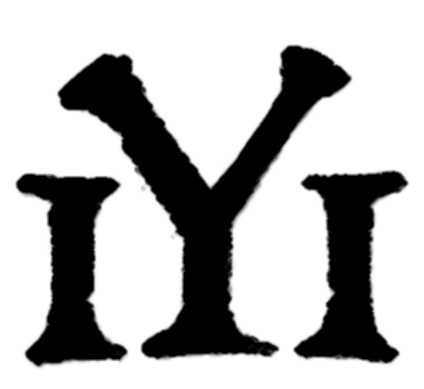
Tamga of the Bulgar clan Dulo.

Tarak Tamga, the national symbol of Crimean Tatars

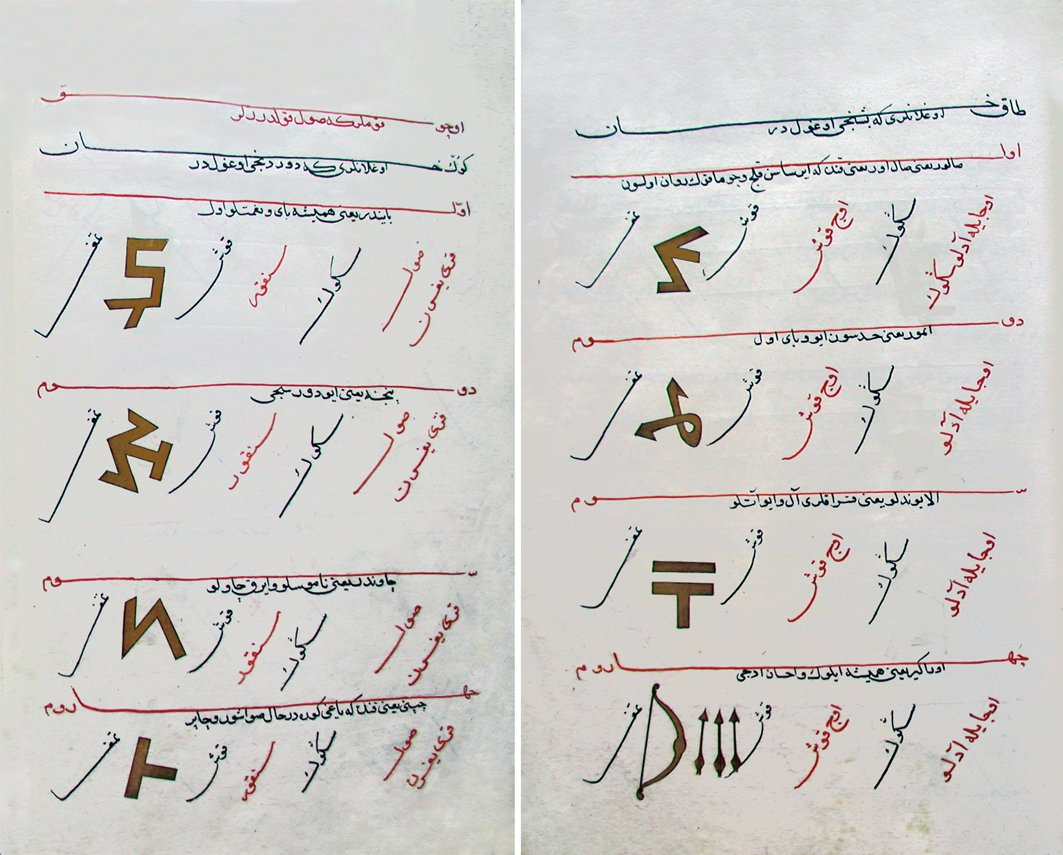
A page from a 15th-century Selçukname, listing Oghuz tamgas.

According to Clauson (1972, p. 504f.), Common Turkic tamga means "originally a `brand' or mark of ownership placed on horses, cattle, and other livestock; it became at a very early date something like a European coat of arms or crest, and as such appears at the head of several Türkü and many O[ld] Kir[giz] funary monuments".

Among modern Turkic peoples, the tamga is a design identifying property or cattle belonging to a specific Turkic clan, usually as a cattle brand or stamp. In Turkestan, it has remained what it originally was: a cattle brand and clan identifier. The Turks who remained pastoral nomad kings in eastern Anatolia and Iran, continued to use their clan tamgas and in fact, they became high-strung nationalistic imagery. The Aq Qoyunlu and Qara Qoyunlu, like many other royal dynasties in Eurasia, put their tamga on their flags and stamped their coinage with it.

When Turkish clans took over more urban or rural areas, tamgas dropped out of use as pastoral ways of life became forgotten. That is most evident in the Turkish clans that took over western and eastern Anatolia after the Battle of Manzikert. The Turks who took over western Anatolia founded the Sultanate of Rûm and became Roman-style aristocrats. Most of them adopted the then-Muslim symbol of the Seal of Solomon after the Sultanate disintegrated into a mass of feuding ghazi states (see Isfendiyarids, Karamanids). Only the Ottoman ghazi state (later to become the Ottoman Empire) kept its tamga, which was so highly stylized that the bow was stylized down eventually to a crescent moon.

Tamgas of the 21 Oghuz tribes (as Charuklug had none) according to Mahmud al-Kashgari in Dīwān Lughāt al-Turk:

Qiniq

Kayı

Bayandur

Yiwa

Salur

Afshar

Begtili

Bugduz

Bayat

Yazigir

Eymur

Karaboluk

Аlkaboluk

Taşburun (Iğdır)

Uregir (Yüregir)

Dodurga

Ulayundluğ

Döger

Pechenek

Chuvaldar

Chepni

=== List of Kazakh tamga symbols that were used by clans ===
Clan	Subclan	Tamga
Senior Jüz		
Qaŋlı		,
Jalayır		
Dulat		,
	Siqım	,,
	Janıs	
	Botbay	
	Şımır	
Alban		
Suwan		
Sarı-Üysin		
Şapıraştı		,,
Oşaqtı		
Istı		,
	Oyıq	,
	Tilik	
Sirgeli		,,,
Şanışqılı		,
Middle Jüz		
Arğın		
	Joğarı şekti	
	Tömengi şekti	
Taraqtı		,
Nayman		,
	Baltalı	
	Bağanalı	,,
	Buwra	
	Qarakerey	
	Matay	
	Sadır	,
Qıpşaq		
Qoŋırat		
	Saŋğıl	
Waq		,,
	Ergenekti Waq	,
Kerei		
	Aşamaylı	
	Abaq	
Junior Jüz		
Bayulı		
	Aday	,
	Beriş	,,,
	Altın	,
	Jappas	,,,
	Esentemir	,
	Taz	,
	Baybaqtı	,,,
	Tana	
	Masqar	
	Altıbas (Alaşa)	,,
	Qızılqurıt	,,,
	Şerkeş	,,
	Isıq	,
Älimulı		
	Qarasaqal	,,
	Qarakesek	,
	Törtqara	
	Şekti	,,
	Şömekey	
Jetiruw		
	Tabın	,,
	Tama	,,
	Jağabayl	
	Telew	,
	Kerderi	
	Kereyit	,
	Ramadan	
Out of Jüz system		
Töre		,
Qoja		,
Töleñgıt		
Noğay-Qazaq		

=== Mongolian ===
"Tamga", or "tamag'a", literally means "stamp" or "seal" in Mongolian and designates emblematic symbols which were historically used by various Mongolic tribes or clans in Central Asia. According to Clauson, it was originally a Turkic word also "used for a Chinese 'seal' and passed into Mong[olian] in this meaning as tamaga".

In the Mongol Empire, a tamgha was a seal placed on taxed items and, by extension, a tax on commerce along cities and trade routes. In the thirteenth and fourteenth centuries, Mongol tax collectors marked the goods with a seal (tamgha) as proof of payment at city gates after the tax was paid. These officials were known in Mongolian as tamghachi (seal/stamp presser).

Over a hundred different Mongolian tamga are known. Certain tamga were adopted by individual medieval Mongol and Chinggisid rulers, and were consequently used on coins and seals issued by these rulers. Tamga are most widely found on Islamic coins issued by the descendants of Chinggis Khan in the various khanates of Central Asia during the 13th and 14th centuries, in particular the Chaghatai Khanate. Tamga are of immense interest to numismatists, and are discussed in many academic works relating to the medieval Islamic coins of Central Asia. However, numismatists and historians currently have limited options for representing tamga symbols in text, and cannot reliably interchange text including tamga symbols because they are either represented as images, or are handdrawn, or use an ad hoc font. Doctor Nyamaa identifies nearly a hundred tamga signs used on coins, although only about half of them can be assigned to a specific ruler, and some of them are variant forms or presentation forms of the same tamga.

Tamga of Genghis Khan

Tamga of Chagatai Khan

Tamga of Ögedei Khan

Tamga of Möngke Khan

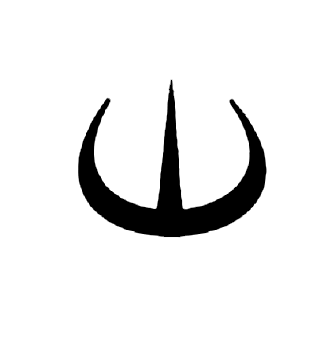
Tamga of Hulegu Khan

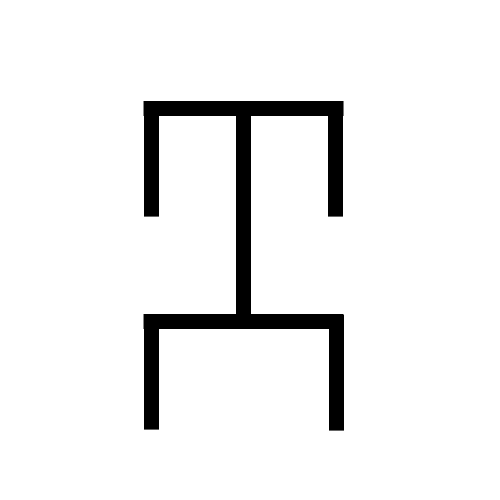
Tamga of Ariq Böke

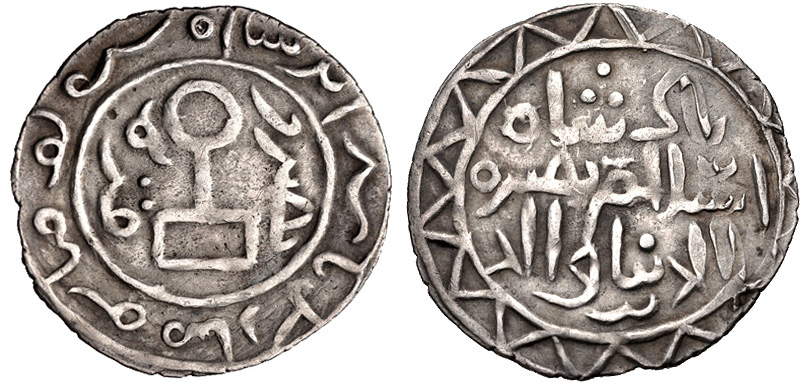
Tamga of Berke Khan

Tamga of Mengu-Timur

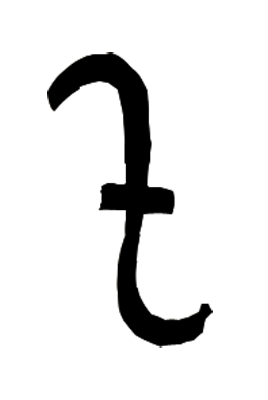
Tamga of Kaidu

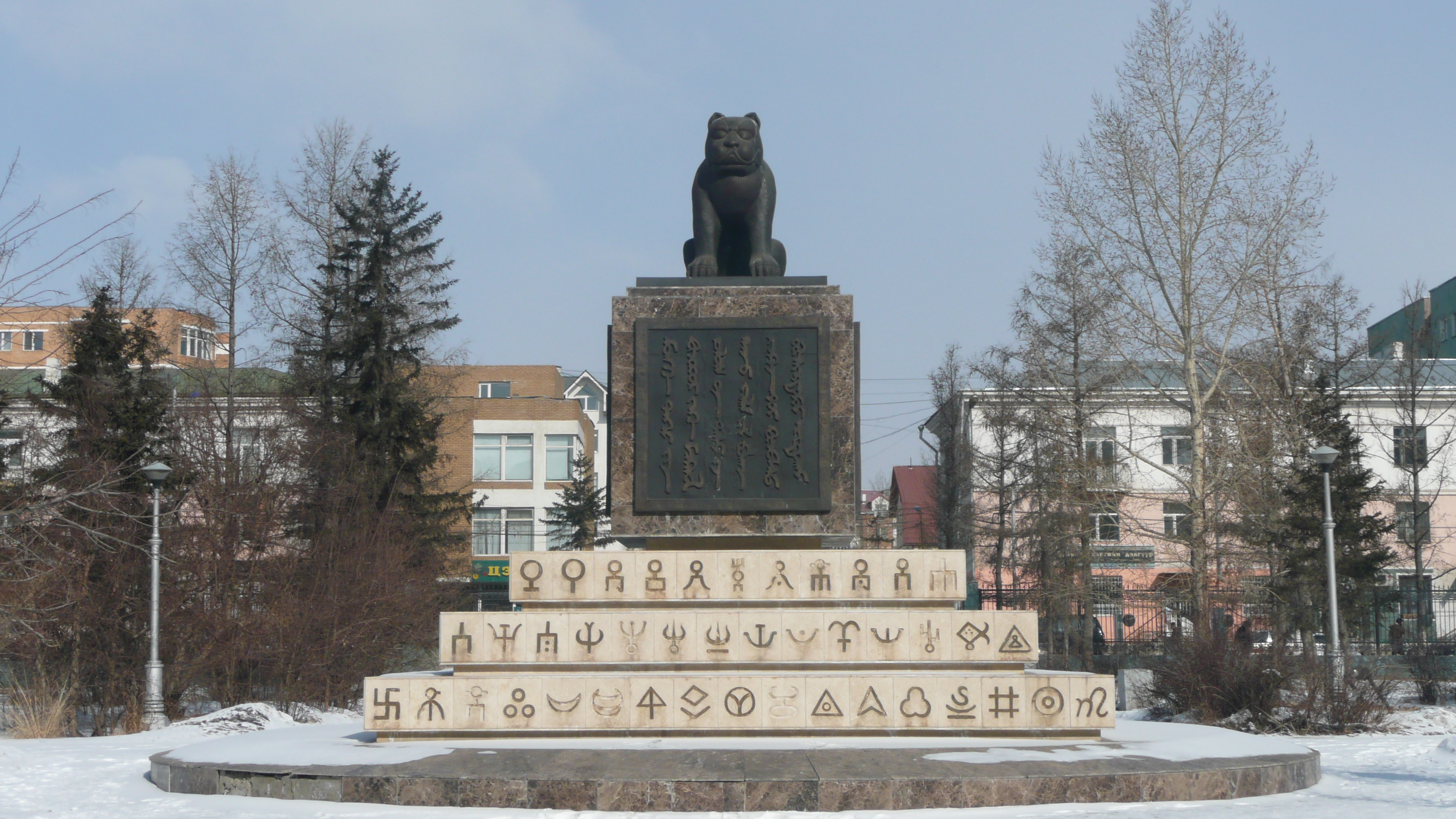
Mongolian State Seal Monument shows 168 tamga on the Monument to the State Seal of Mongolia in Ulaanbaatar.

Tamgas are also stamped using hot irons on domesticated animals such as horses in present-day Mongolia and others to identify that the livestock belongs to a certain family, since livestock is allowed to roam during the day. Each family has their own tamga markings for easier identification. Tamga marks are not very elaborate, since they are made from curved pieces of iron by the individual families.

A tamag'a is also used as the "state seal" of Mongolia, which is handed over by the President of Mongolia as part of the transition to a new president. In the presidential case, the tamag'a is a little more elaborate and is contained in a wooden box.

== Tamgas in the Caucasus ==
=== Circassians ===
Examples of Circassian tamgas from the Abzakh tribe

Among the Circassians, almost every family has a tamga to this day. The tamga consists of simple lines and hooks and functions as a family crest, property mark, and lineage symbol. The rules for using a tamga are integrated directly into Khabze. Families used it primarily to brand livestock, such as horses and sheep. Fathers passed the tamga down to their sons, and customary law strictly forbade anyone from forging or using another family's mark. The tamga had several uses beyond agriculture. A tamga was often used as a seal or signature on documents. Craftsmen stamped it on their products to show origin. Families carved it on tombstones to identify the dead, and commanders drew it on military flags. Losing a flag that carried the family tamga was a source of shame. In the modern era, the tamga lost its practical use for branding livestock or sealing documents, but is preserved as a "Family Symbol" or family coat of arms. Tamgas are still used in arts and frequently incorporated into the geometric patterns of traditional multi-colored woven mats and prayer rugs. Families still engrave them on weapons and rings, and carve them into gravestones to clearly identify the burial sites of their relatives. In Turkey, since Circassians were forced to adopt Turkish language surnames as per the Surname law, they carved their tamgas into gravestones to preserve memory of their Circassian families.

=== Ingush ===
In Ingushetia, members of the aristocracy used tamgas as hereditary emblems, examples of which can be seen on tower complexes in auls such as Erzi, Egikal, Targim, Khamkhi, Yevloy, and Vovnushki.

== Secondary usage ==
=== Eastern Europe ===
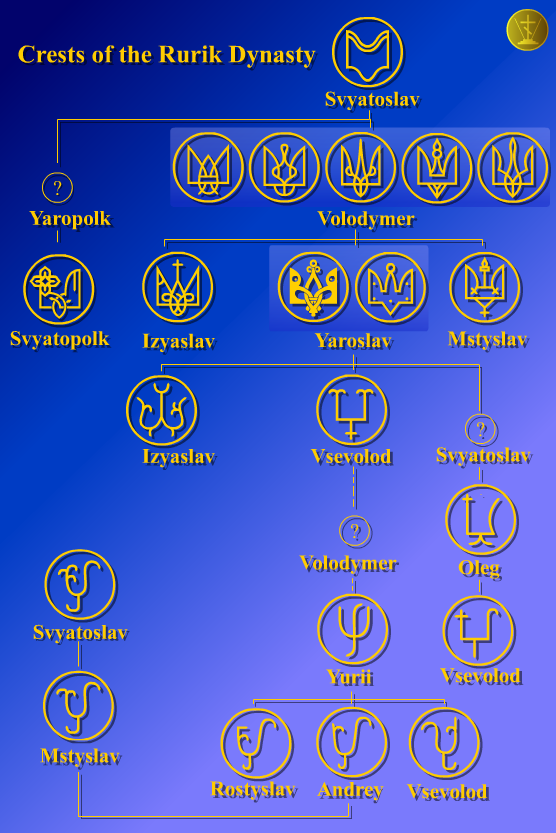
The personal symbols of the Rurikid nobles.

Throughout the early Middle Ages, the Rurikid nobles of Rus' used Tamga-like symbols to denote property rights over various items (Rurikid symbols). Very likely, these are of Khazar (Turkic) origin and have been adopted along with the expansion of the Rus into steppe territory. A similar process of acculturation of steppe elements can also be suspected for (or before) the Second Bulgarian Empire (1185–1396), as its flags closely resemble the Rurikid symbols in taking the shape of a trident.

The coat of arms of Ukraine, an example of a Rurikid Trident.

In East Slavic languages, the term tamga (Russian тамга) came to refer to the state institution of border customs, with an associated cluster of terms: rastamozhit' (Russian растаможить, Belarusian растаможыць, pay customs duties), tamozhnya (Russian таможня, customs), tamozhennik (Russian таможенник, customs officer), derived from the use of tamga as a certificate of the state. In East Slavic, the steppe term competes with forms assumed to originate from Germanic (Old Church Slavonic мꙑто toll, Russian (historical) мы́то "customs duty", Ukrainian мито "toll, customs duty", and Belarusian мытня, Ukrainian митниця "customs"; cf. German Maut "street toll" and Medieval Latin mūta "toll").

In the 20th century, the Rurikid trident, colloquially called tryzub (тризуб), has been adopted as the national symbol and the coat of arms of Ukraine. The modern version has been designed by Vasyl Krychevsky (1918) and Andriy Grechylo, Oleksii Kokhan, and Ivan Turetskyi (1992).

=== Islamic empires ===
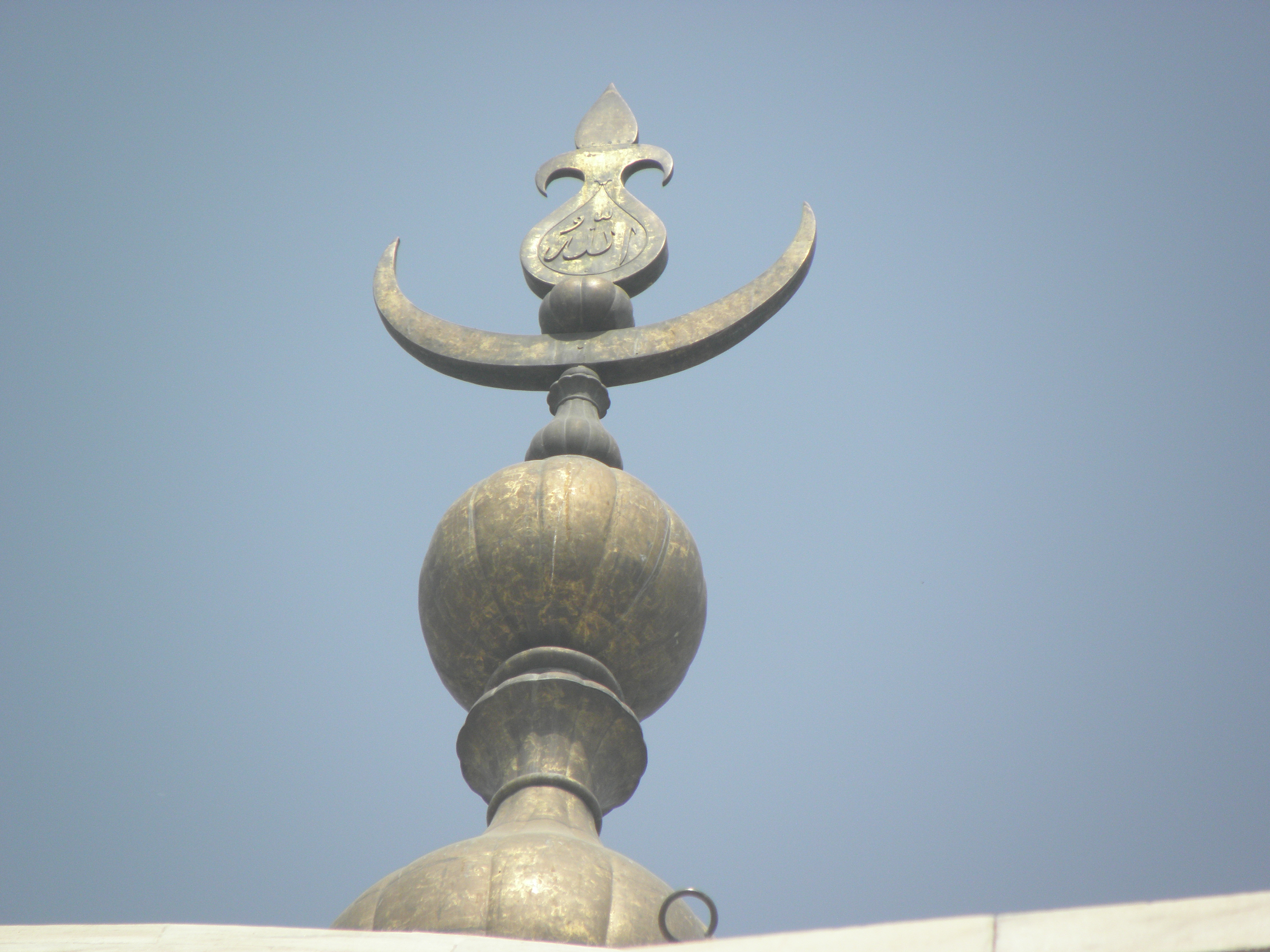
Tamga of the Mughal Empire on top of the Taj Mahal.

In the late medieval Turco-Mongol states, the term tamga was used for any kind of official stamp or seal. This usage persisted in the early modern Islamic Empires (Ottoman Empire, Mughal Empire), and in some of their modern successor states.

In the Urdu language (which absorbed Turkic vocabulary), Tamgha is used as medal. Tamgha-i-Jurat is the fourth highest Military medal of Pakistan. It is admissible to all ranks for gallantry and distinguished services in combat. Tamgha-i-Imtiaz or Tamgha-e-Imtiaz (Urdu: تمغہ امتیاز), which translates as "medal of excellence", is fourth highest honour given by the Government of Pakistan to both the military and civilians. Tamgha-i-Khidmat or Tamgha-e-Khidmat (تمغۂ خدمت), which translates as "medal of services", is seventh highest honour given by the Government of Pakistan to both the military and civilians. It is admissible to non-commissioned officers and other ranks for long meritorious or distinguished services of a non-operational nature.

In Egypt, the term damgha (Arabic: دمغة) or tamgha (تمغة) is still used in two contexts. One is a tax or fee when dealing with the government. It is normally in the form of stamps that have to be purchased and affixed to government forms, such as a driver license or a registration deed for a contract. The term is derived from the Ottoman damga resmi. Another is a stamp put on every piece of jewelry made from gold or silver to indicate it is genuine, and not made of baser metals.

== See also ==
- House mark
- Mon (emblem)
- Siglas poveiras
- Tughra
