= Sinirname =

Ottoman Empire legal document

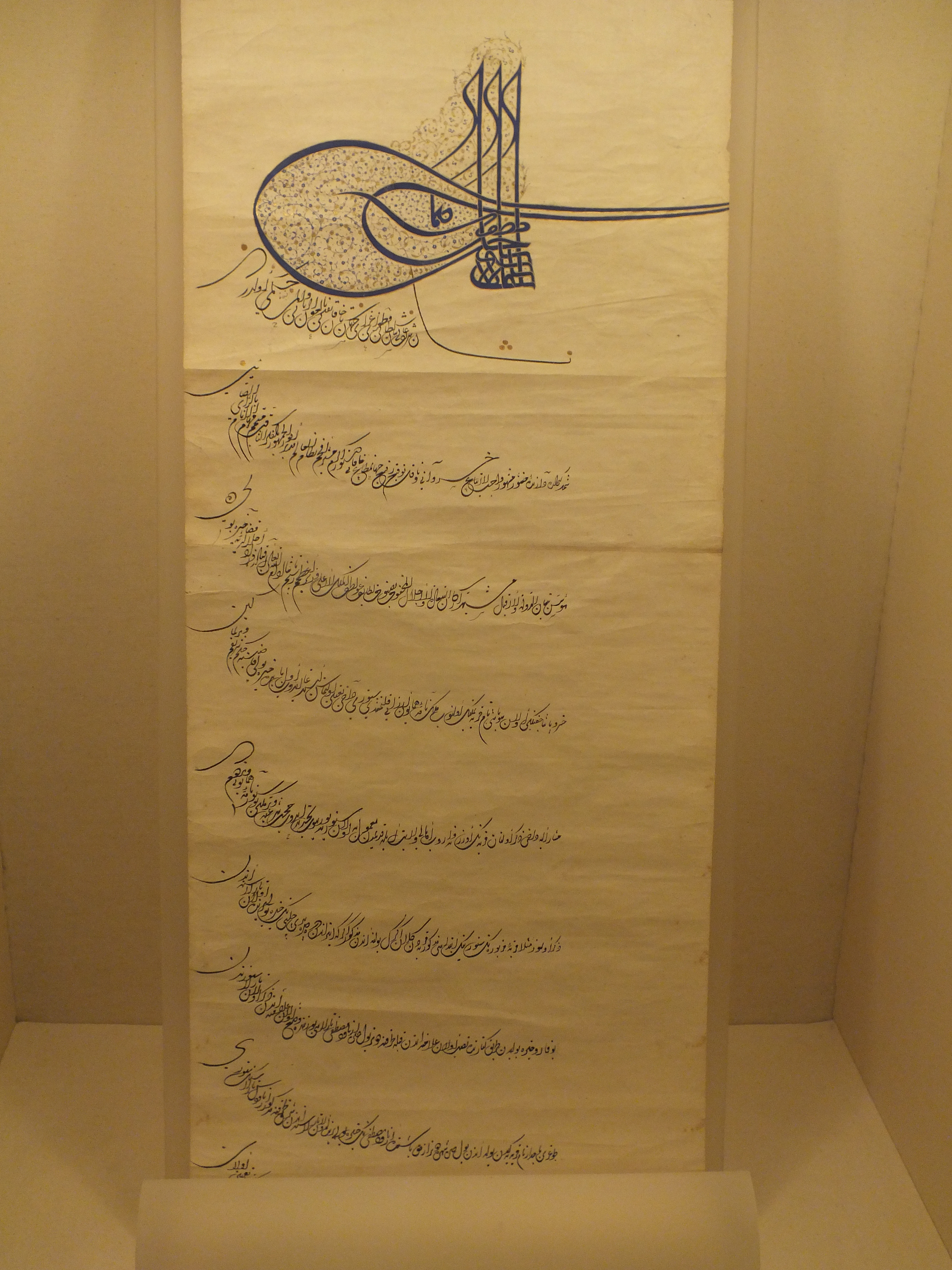
A sınırname for the village of Subaşı, in Hayrabolu district, in eastern Thrace; which was mülk (freehold) land belonging to Rüstem Pasha. The top of the "sınırname" is signed with the imperial tughra.

A Sınırname was a type of document in the Ottoman Empire, representing an area of land; similar to a modern title deed, although often describing a larger area such as a village or district, rather than a single residence.

A sınırname would be granted by a higher authority - even the sultan. It would describe the boundary of the land. A sınırname might be issued like a land grant, or it might be issued following resolution of a border dispute (for instance, by a kadi).

Sınırname also described land usage; they were parallel to the system of defters which were used for taxation.
