= Muafiyet =

Muafiyet was a tax exemption mechanism for Ottoman towns or villages; an individual decree of tax exemption was called a muafname.

After a muafname was issued to a town, the urban population would be exempted from some of the taxes on raya, such as resm-i çift. Taxation in the Ottoman Empire was complex, including various routine and extraordinary taxes, and different rates for social groups; a muafname might apply to one or more of these taxes.

The Muafiyet system was a deliberate policy of the Sublime Porte, working to encourage the growth of urban populations from the 15th century onwards, although forgoing some tax revenue.

Tax exemption was prized by locals; so, the granting of a muafname was subject to "pull" as well as "push". Muafname might be requested by the local bey or kadı. Enforcement of the complex patchwork of taxes and exemptions could vary; in one case, taxes were collected from villages despite a muafname, and the local kadı wrote that subsequent legitimate taxes were held back to compensate for the wrongful taxation.

- Sarajevo, in Bosnia Eyalet, was granted muafname by Mehmed II in the 1460s; there was subsequent "creep" in the remit due to pressure from groups of local people.
- In 1758, a new muafname exempted all the Muslims of Sarajevo from taxes.
- The populace of Banja Luka were exempted from all customary and extraordinary taxes "as long as they are ready to repulse with weapons the attacks of infidels against the Sultan's lands and fortresses".
- After its conquest, both Muslims and non-Muslims of Selanik were granted a muafname exempting them from avariz-i divaniyye and tekalif-i örfiye.

A muafiyet emri, or tax exemption order, might even be given to an individual ship's captain.
