= Ispendje =

Tax levied on non-Muslims in the Ottoman Empire

İspençe was a land tax levied on non-Muslims in the Ottoman Empire.

İspençe was a land-tax on non-Muslims in parts of the Ottoman Empire; its counterpart, for Muslim taxpayers, was the resm-i çift - which was set at slightly lower rate. The treasury was well aware of the difference in tax takes, and the incentive to convert; the legal reforms of Bayezid II halved some criminal penalties on non-Muslim taxpayers "so that the taxpayers shall not vanish"; this rule was reconfirmed a century later, in 1587. In other cases, local taxes were imposed on non-Muslims specifically to encourage conversion.

İspençe had existed in the Balkans before the Ottoman conquest; the Ottoman Empire typically adapted local taxes and institutions in each conquered area, leading to a patchwork of different taxes and rates. The concept of İspençe, theoretically a payment in lieu of corvee labour, was derived from the Byzantine "zeugaratikion", a land tax based on the zeugarion - the area of farmland which could be ploughed by a pair of oxen. The zeugarion itself was taken up as the Ottoman "çift", a word meaning "pair".

== Variation ==
Despite taxes being set centrally, by the Porte, there was some local variance; around 1718. the kadı of Janjevo complained to Istanbul that the local lord set ispençe at 80 akçes per year rather than official rate of 32.

As with other Ottoman taxes, there were various exemptions and loopholes; royal hunters, who provided birds-of-prey to the court, had an exemption from ispençe (and other taxes); they could pass on their job, and the tax exemption, to their sons. There were also some exemptions for those unable to work their land through disability, although it was expected that the elderly would have children able to work and therefore to pay ispençe.

The tax was paid by adult male heads of households; in the Morea it increased to 25 akces (from 20) between 1480 and 1512, and stayed at a similar level after that, (for most), confirmed by the tahrir of 1583; but widows may have paid a reduced rate, and Jews may have paid 125 akces.

== See also ==
- Jizya
- Haraç
- Zakat
