= Töleñgıt =

Kazakh clan

Төлеңгіт
- Tamga used by the Töleñgıt

Regions with significant populations
- Kazakhstan, Russia

Languages
- Kazakh, Russian

Religion
- Predominantly Sunni Islam

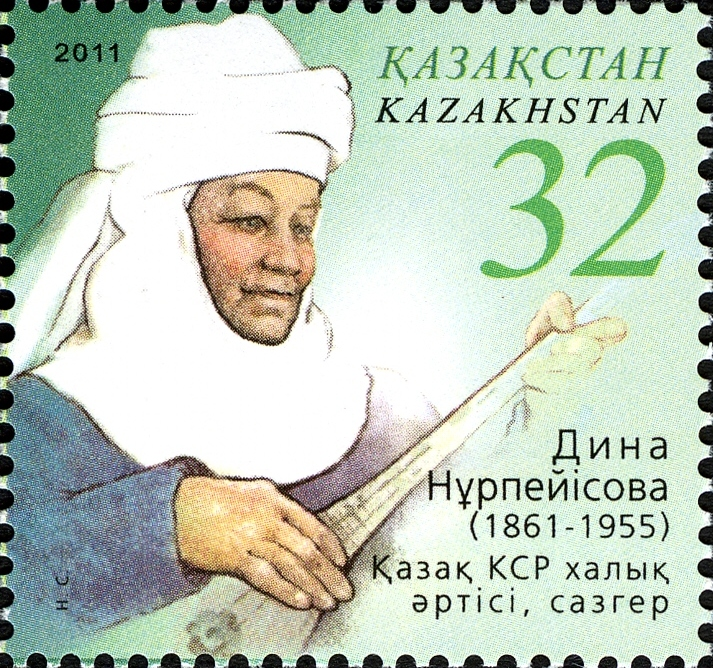
Kazakh musician Dina Nurpeisova, representative of the Töleñgıt clan, Kazakhstan Postage Stamp

Töleñgit (also Töleñgüt, Teleñgit or Teleñget, from Kazakh: Төлеңгіт and Altay: Телеҥет) is a Kazakh clan which has served Kazakh khans and sultans. It is not a part of any of the Kazakh zhuzes. In the Ulus of the Kazakhs, it was a special class and reliable support of the Kazakh khans.

== History ==
In the 6th and 7th centuries, Töleñgits were part of the First Turkic Khaganate (“Kök-Türük Qaghandyghy”). In the 8th century, they migrated east along the Syr. At that time, they were part of the Oguz tribal association. In the 11th century, this group lived in the lower estuary of the Harlan (Modern Mongolian: Herlen) as part of the Tzubu Union, along with the Khitans and Jurchens. Since the 9th century, the Jalayirs have been known as the "foreign Jalayir" tribe of ten clans. They are: Jat, Toqyrawyn, Könsawyt, Qunsawyt, Oyat (Rashid al-Din Hamadani indicated "Uyat"), Nilqan, Qurqyn, Töleñgit, Börü, Shanghut.

In Jāmiʿ al-Tawārīkh (=Complete History) by Rashid al-Din, Genghis Khan's settlement is mentioned among remote tribes. Tatars live outside the steppe, in a forested area and that is why they belong to the community known as “tree country”. Rashid al-Din wrote that Töleñgits and Tatars have a similar way of life - mainly hunting, but their lineage and way of life are different. He pointed out that Töleñgits are of Turkic origin. Töleñgit (Telengut, Telengit) is one of the ancient clans formed in the eastern part of the Turkic world. The origin ("Tolonko", "Dolange") originates from the Tiele Confederation, which is considered a family of Huns and is called “Gaogüy” in Chinese sources. The armed forces were around 50,000 people and 10,000 households. During the time of the “Kök-Türük Qaghanat”, which continued to the Hun dynasty, the Nine-Oguz (“Toghyz-Oghuz”) were among the main clans in the Toly (Modern Mongolian: Tuul) River valley. When the great state splits into two, they remained part of the Eastern Turkic Khaganate ("Shyghys Kök-Türük Qaghandyghy"). At that time, they settled along the Zapkan (Modern Mongolian: Zavkhan) River in the central-eastern part of Great Steppe (close to modern Mongolian capital Ulan-Baatar).

It can be said that after the collapse of the Celestial Turkic Empire, the number and power of the Turkic people decreased then Töleñgits shifted to the outskirts of Sayan, near Bayköl (Baikal Lake). At this time, we see that some branches and parts of the first powerful community were part of other fundamental tribes that remained within the Great Steppe.

Among the Altai Töleñgits there are: Mundus, Todosh, Yrghyt, Köbek, Saghal, Toghul, Tonjon, Orsaq, and Qypchaq, Almat (from a branch of the ancient Kerey), Naiman, Töles and Merkit. If we assume that the first of these are unique to the settlement itself, the last ones are clans that came later.

Among the Kazakh Töleñgits there are: Naiman, Mamadaiyr, Kusshi, Qalmaq, Deyit, Tabyn, Jemet, Qara-Eshki, Wanas, Jalañ, Taz, Jölke, Oñajyt, Boran, Telew. A clarification is needed: “Qalmaq” here is not the ordinary “Kalmyk”, but branch of the mentioned clan among the Desht-i-Qypchaq nomads of the XV-XVIth centuries, or a community of the same name that came with the first unified Töleñgits. In Töleñgit chronicles, the Kalmyk tribe descends from a man named Jelden. This Jelden among Tabyn, Telew, Taz and Jalañ can be considered the minor ancestors of the Tolengit tribe in Altai.

== People ==
Like other prominent tribes in modern Kazakhstan, people from the Töleñgits clan also left a significant mark on the country's life. Janazar Batyr, commander during the time of Abylai Khan, Jazyk, a poetess of the first half of the 19th century, Dina Nurpeyisova, a musician who worked in the 19-20th centuries, Orynbek Jäwtikov, a mathematician who became famous in the second half of the 20th century, conductor Shamghon Qazhyghalyiev, who transformed and rebuilt the Kazakh national instrument orchestra, classical writer Täken Älimqulov, well-known literary critic Zeynolla Serikqalyiev belonged to this ancient clan.
