= Tarak Tamga =

Seal of the Crimean Tatars

Versions
- Use: Giray dynasty, Crimean Khanate, Crimean Tatars

Tarak Tamga (Crimean Tatar: Къырымтатар тамгъасы, romanized: Qırımtatar tamğası, Ukrainian: Тамга кримських татар) is the tamga of the Crimean Tatars, and was first used during the Giray dynasty. It has since become the most used emblem to represent the ethnic group.

== History ==
The use of this symbol began during the Giray dynasty, and was also present on the flag of the Crimean Khanate. It was also present on the seal of the short-lived Crimean People's Republic in 1917.

Since the 1980s, many who were displaced during the Deportation of the Crimean Tatars began to return, and a blue flag with the Tarak Tamga were often used to represent their ethnic identity.
