= Gümrük resmi =

The gümrük resmi (also called a selametlik resmi, paid to a gümrük emin) was a customs charge, or tax, in the Ottoman Empire. In modern-day Turkey the term continues to be in use: Gümrük vergi ve resimleri (Turkish for customs taxes and duties).

Customs duties were typically paid on the value of commodities; in the Ottoman empire, just as in modern commerce, this would fuel disagreements over the "value" of the goods being traded.

As with other Ottoman taxes, collection could be "farmed out" to a contractor who would agree to pay a fixed amount, or a percentage, to the government. Sometimes the tax farmer might attempt to request customs duties on goods or traders which had previously been exempt. In the 17th century, gümrük resmi was capped at 3% for Dutch traders; but nonetheless, the emin might attempt to increase that, or to try other ways of calculating duty which would increase the amount payable.

In the 18th century, the Ottoman empire attempted to enforce gümrük on all vessels sailing in and out of the Persian Gulf; however, this was increasingly difficult as ships could not be forced to call at the customs-post in the port of Muscat, local chiefs failed to pay gümrük from their ports promptly (or at all), and vessels from (or under the protection of) the great powers such as Britain were effectively exempted from gümrük. After 1795, the Sultan responded to this problem by encouraging a certain form of freebooting; the Suwaydi tribe were encouraged to settle at the Hormuz Strait, a bottleneck at the mouth of the Persian Gulf, and they were tacitly encouraged to raid any ship which could not prove it had paid gümrük resmi.

Some farmers in border areas might attempt to evade livestock taxes by claiming to each government that their livestock were on the "other" side of the border; sultan Selim ordered in 1571 that gümrük resmi would have to be paid, but some tax evasion appears to have continued.

Sometimes an emin might be stationed at a port or border crossing, to manage customs; this would be a gümrük emin.
