= Taxation in the Ottoman Empire =

Taxation in the Ottoman Empire developed over a period of six hundred years from a decentralized system of agrarian land grants to a centralized fiscal administration. The imperial tax system was an interconnected mosaic of sultanic administrative laws (kanun), Islamic religious obligations (sharia), and customary local taxes (tekâlif-i örfiyye) which responded to changing demands for military resources and recurring financial crises.

== Inheritance ==
As the Ottoman Empire conquered new territories, it adopted and adapted the existing tax systems already used by the previous governments. For instance, at the conquest of Belgrade, the Sultan instructed an official to gather information on the pre-conquest tax system, which would be replicated post-conquest. At the start of each area's tahrir (a tax ledger) was an outline of the traditional tax laws in that area.

This led to a complex patchwork of different taxes in different parts of the empire, and between different communities. In the Fertile Crescent, the Ottomans inherited muqasama (sharing), a proportional tax on agricultural output, from the Mamluks; it was distinctly different from the uniform tax rates in other newly conquered territories. As farmers reacted to locally varying taxes on different farm products, this increased variations in agricultural output between areas, or even between villages; farms subject to the highest taxes switched to alternative crops. Discriminatory rates tend to lead to production inefficiencies.

== Defter ==
The defter was a tax register. It recorded names and property/land ownership; it categorised households, and sometimes whole villages, by religion. The names recorded in a defter can give valuable information about ethnic background; these tax records are a valuable source for current-day historians investigating the ethnic & religious history of parts of the Ottoman Empire. The Ottoman double-entry accounting method, merdiban, was inherited from the Abbasid empire.

The Ottoman Empire created an accounting system that included this type of detailed record (tahrir defterleri) using regular land surveys. Mufassal defterleri were used as an example of how much detail could be put into a register by including information about all taxable adults, their number of acres in cultivation, etc., and an estimate of what the total would be in terms of taxation from various types of agricultural products or economic activity. The government's goal was to calculate estimated tax payments over a period of time; the method used was to take the average of each farmer's crop yield for three years. At the beginning of most registers were a Kanunname which gave the reader the rules and regulations regarding taxes in addition to giving examples of how many bushels of wheat per head of cattle, etc.

== Feudal estates ==
The primary role of the Timar system was to collect feudal obligations, before cash taxes became dominant. The Ottoman Empire had a hierarchy of different types of estate; a Hass was larger than a Zaim estate, which in turn was larger than a timar. In the Balkans, peasants on timars typically paid a tithe or a tax in kind, of around 10–25% of their farm produce; they were also obliged to pay other charges and perform corvee for the landlord, although these obligations may have been a lighter burden than in some contemporary Western European states. This system closely resembles the medieval Serb feudal system, which in turn inherited from the Byzantine.

The government of the empire used cadastral registers that were updated from time to time (tahrir defterleri) to register claims by the government over public lands (miri), to calculate the potential revenue of villages, and to provide that estimated revenue to be paid to members of the army and bureaucracy for their services. In each grant of land (timar), production of crops was based upon a peasant family's (reaya) use of a subsistence plot through an agreement where they had usufructuary rights to it in exchange for paying title and taxes. A timar-holder (sipahi) received personal, private, prebendary farms (hassa çiftlikler) for his own personal or household use. Because of laws of the empire forbidding the forcing of peasants who were registered, to cultivate timar-holders' private lands, timar-holders usually rented out their private lands to farmers/cultivators at a rate agreed upon by both parties to include all costs and labor associated with farming.

Beginning with the seventeenth century, a new system of tax farming (iltizam) and long term lease for revenue (malikâne), gradually replaced the traditional timar as the Ottoman State had been seeking funds to cover its costs associated with military modernization. The Ottoman Treasury at first desired to protect small-holding peasant farms from being absorbed into larger land holdings; however, many local notables (ayans) and tax farmers were able to create large commercial estates (çiftlik) using newly reclaimed or previously unused lands (mawât) by hiring both sharecroppers and wage workers.

== A patchwork of different communities and taxes ==
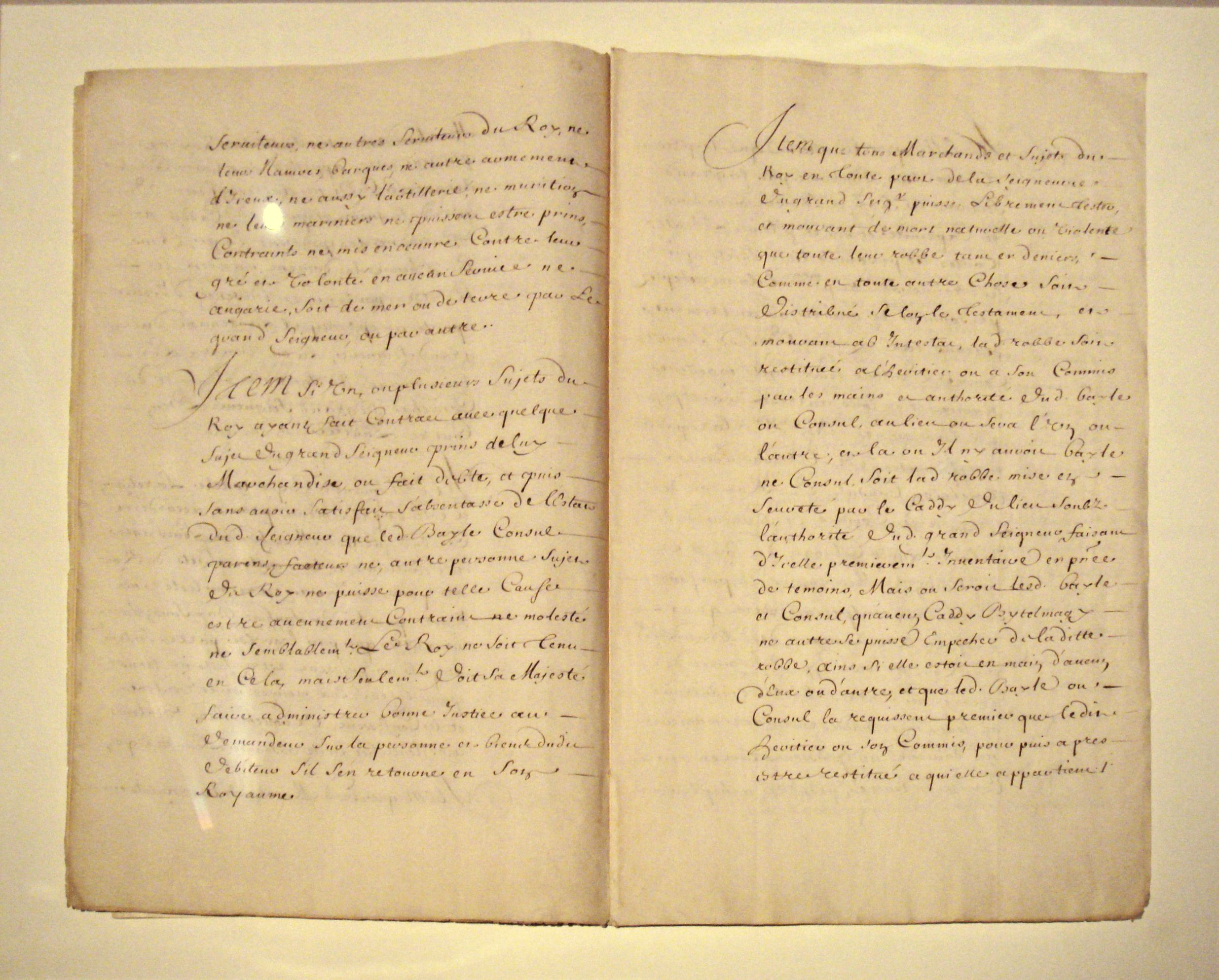
A treaty from 1536, granting concessions to the French across the whole of the Ottoman Empire

As well as regional variation, there were different taxes applied to different religious and ethnic groups; Muslims paid resm-i çift whilst non-Muslims paid İspençe.

These taxes might be further graduated according to people's ability to pay. In 1530, the Eyalet of Rumelia had graduated taxes even between different religious subsets of a small ethnic minority; Muslim Romani paid 22 aspers per household, nonmuslim paid 25.

In some cases, local taxes were imposed on nonmuslims specifically to encourage conversion; conversely, measures might be taken at other times to prevent conversion, in order to prop up tax revenues.

There was a practice of making villages communally responsible for the haraç tax; if one villager fled (or converted to Islam), the others would have to pay more. In good years, community pressure would ensure compliance; but in bad years the difficulty of paying a share of other people's taxes could lead to a vicious circle, as more taxpayers fled:

There were 1700 persons that pay'd Harrach before the Venetian Warr, & that now there were but 700 left all the rest having abandoned their Houses, and Vinyards, & that those which remaine fly daily because they must pay not only for themselves, but for the whole 1700

— William Winchilsea,

In the Balkans, Vlachs had tax concessions under Byzantine and Serb rulers in return for military service, and this continued under Ottoman rule. There was a special vlach tax, rusum-e eflak: one sheep and one lamb from each household on St Georges day each year. Because Vlachs were taxed differently, they were listed differently in defters.

There could be considerable regional variance, and local lords might try to line their own pockets; around 1718 the kadi of Janjevo complained to the Porte that the local lord had set İspençe at 80 akçes, rather than the official rate of 32 akçes.

There was also a patchwork of tax exemptions called muafiyet, which might be applied to towns, social groups, or even individuals.

== Church taxation ==
Eastern Orthodox churches were allowed to raise taxes among their communities; this led to a position where priests would pay very large amounts—to both church superiors and Ottoman officials—to get a senior post, expecting that the cost could be amply recouped from tithes.

Sometimes, the "taxation" of churches by the Ottoman authorities could be shockingly direct: in 1603 Franciscan friars in Bosnia were imprisoned until they paid an arbitrary fee of 3000 aspers for permission to stay in their monasteries.

== Waqufs ==
Waqfs were, in one sense, a form of tax avoidance; a perpetual trust which was not, itself, taxed. However, some were very well-endowed, and provided various local services such as education which compensated for the Ottoman government's inability to provide local services funded by taxation. Some became so powerful that whole towns developed around the social services they provided; there are towns in the Balkans which include the name "Vakuf". A well-endowed vakuf might even take on the role of helping a community pay their annual tax obligations.

== Conflict ==
Taxes were often difficult to collect, especially from rebellious areas. Conversely, high taxes could often provoke rebellion. The demand for taxes was higher during times of war; these factors together could provoke a vicious circle of taxation and rebellion – in 1585, 2000 villagers near Debar revolted over an increase in cizye.

While the local pashas imposed new forms of requisitioning and fines, the state did the same thing on a larger scale, with a number of 'extraordinary' taxes which rapidly became both ordinary and heavy.

— Noel Malcolm,

The Ottoman state went bankrupt in 1590; this led to economic collapse and several years of revolts across the empire.

== Complexity and reform ==
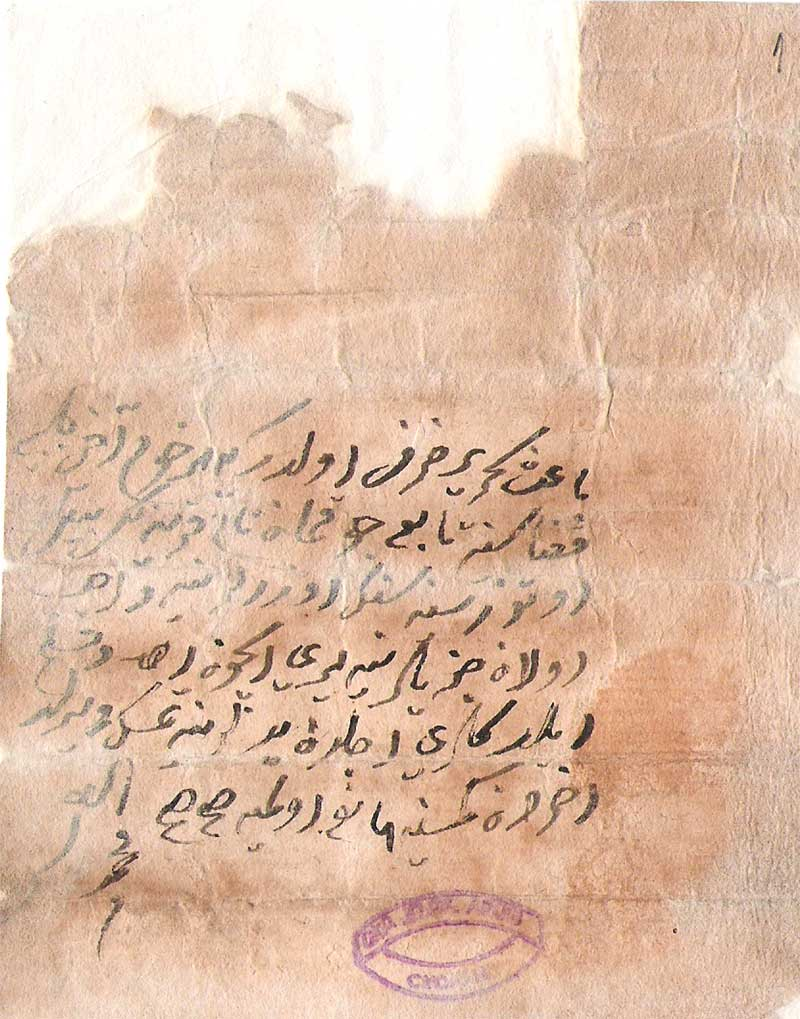
A receipt for cizye (poll-tax) paid by the village of Chokmanovo.

In 17th–18th century, changes in warfare (favouring professional infantry over feudal cavalry) put more emphasis on taxes rather than on military duties; hence, when timars fell vacant they were taken over by the state and converted into tax-farms and private estates. Avariz, a centralised cash tax, became the norm rather than an exception.

There was a shift towards fully owned hereditary estates rather than feudal lords; ciftlik were preferred to timar, because tenants had fewer rights – hence more cash could be extracted from them.

The Hatt-ı Şerif of Gülhane declared the equality of different ethnic and religious groups – abolishing the Kanun-i Raya – and reformed taxes. However, not all these changes percolated to the outer areas of empire.

In Bosnia, haraç was not abolished until 1855, at the same time that Christians were permitted to serve as soldiers; however, a new charge in lieu of military service appeared and was levied to haraç, so the only real change was a tax increase on those Muslims not serving in the military. An 1859 decree set a tax-in-kind of one third for peasants on Agaluk (formerly Timar) estates, which became known locally as "tretina". This was in addition to a state tithe set at 10% of crop value. Other charges would push the total tax burden over 40% – all this in a state which could not provide the social benefits that are offered in modern countries with similarly high tax rates.

In 1839, Sultan Abdülmecid I pushed a set of major new reforms to the tax system, including the abolition of tax-farming. The Tanzimat reforms introduced a new income tax; they also did away with many of the complex old taxes, although cizye remained. Taxation on corporate profits, in the modern sense, only really became possible after a cadastral survey in 1858–1860; the temettu (profit tax) was set at 3% in 1860, and later raised to 4% in 1878.

== The Tanzimat reforms ==
The two most important sources of tax revenue were the zakat, which taxed commodities and land (and similar taxes like the ağnam resmi, a tax on sheep) and the cizye tax that was paid by Christian and Jewish subjects.

The restructuring of the tax system was a central goal of the Tanzimat ("ordering") reforms, even though practical implementation remained limited. The reform policies were proclaimed in the 1839 Edict of Gülhane and the Ottoman Reform Edict of 1856 that lead up to the Ottoman constitution of 1876. Faced with the economic, military, and technological superiority of the Western European powers and Russia, the Sublime Porte aimed to centralize and strengthen the administration, while granting formal legal equality and self-administration rights to the members of the Millet confessional communities. In this context, a central goal of the reforms was to expand the tax base and reorganize tax collection, in order to increase government revenue and cover the growing military costs.

Despite the efforts at reform, however, increases in tax revenue did not match the growing expenditure, so that the government more and more had to rely on foreign loans. Also, the rural population had to suffer a high tax burden as the government was trying to reduce the budget deficit. Among the taxes levied were property and military service exemption taxes as well as tithes. The latter were usually collected by private persons who were authorized by the government to do so. This often lead to conflicts as, according to contemporary reports, the tax collectors abused their powers and exerted violence on the population. In addition, an excise tax (Müskirat resmi) was charged on the manufacture of wine and spirits. This affected only non-Muslim groups, as Muslims were not allowed to consume and produce alcohol. Another problem that came up with the reforms was that of double taxation. For instance, Armenians in the Anatolian provinces traditionally paid protection taxes to local notables and tribesmen, most of them Kurds. This practice did not vanish as the government extended its fiscal reach into the provinces. As a consequence, the Armenians suffered from a double tax burden, as well as from forceful tax collection practices and other acts of violence.

Another key aspect of the tax reforms was the abolition of the Iltizam tax farming system, which had been implemented in the Arab provinces, with the Reform Edict of 1856. The system, however, remained in place in various forms and regions until the twentieth century.

All in all, it must be mentioned that taxation practices and the degree of reform implementation varied considerably from province to province, so that generalizations must be avoided.

== See also ==
- Economic history of the Ottoman Empire
- Taxation in Turkey
- 1942 wealth tax in Turkey

== Bibliography ==
- Malcolm, Noel (1996). Bosnia: A Short History. ISBN 978-0-8147-5561-7.
