= Adet-i deştbani =

Agricultural penalty charge in the Ottoman Empire

The adet-i deştbani (sometimes known as resm-i destbani) was a charge, or tax, in the Ottoman Empire, which was a penalty for crop damage.

The adet-i deştbani may have arisen as a result of tension between nomadic livestock-herders and settled farmers; the former's animals would encroach on, and damage, the latter's arable land; to discourage this, an official called a deştban (who was responsible to a sipahi) was responsible for crop protection - they also guarded against crop theft.

If a farmer's horses, cattle, sheep or goats escaped and damaged another person's crops, then the farmer was liable to pay a fine, of a fixed amount per animal. This was separate from any compensation to the owner of the crops. The level of adet-i deştbani could vary from time to time and from place to place; in Mosul in 1540, it was set at 5 akçes per animal. A later kanunname (for the Morea and Anavarin in 1716) set a combined tariff of taxes and corporal punishment; after any damage had been estimated, a straying horse, mule, or ox would earn its owner 5 blows in addition to a 5 akçe fine; 4 akçes for a cow, 1 akçe for a calf or sheep - plus 1 blow per 2 sheep.

The adet-i deştbani was considered to be a bad-i hava tax along with fines from crimes, the tapu charge for registration of land ownership, and the resm-i arusane (bride tax). It was a relatively minor tax, accounting for a small proportion of revenue from the raya. Surviving tax records for the village of Sakal Dutan in 1550 show a total of 30 akçes for adet-i deştbani - far smaller than the 300 akçes paid on wheat and barley crops, or the 170 akçes of land-tax such as resm-i çift.

One source even describes adet-i deştbani as a fee for the protection of crops; the fee being half a pinte of butter (worth 30 akçes).
