= Adet-i ağnam =

Tax on sheep and goats in the Ottoman Empire

The adet-i ağnam (literally meaning "sheep number") was an annual tax on sheep and goats in the Ottoman Empire. Initially, the tax was known as resm-i ağnam; the name changed around 1550.

== Rate ==
The tax varied; some records show a charge of one akçe per head of livestock, whilst other records show a charge of one akçe for every two or three sheep. In one case, the first hundred animals in a flock were tax-exempt.

This tax could be a source of considerable revenue, even in areas where wheat and barley farming were dominant. The adet-i ağnam could be subject to tax farming; magnates would pay a hefty downpayment to the treasury in return for the right to collect sheep-taxes from villages. The Ottoman government used various means to encourage sheep-rearing, because it was a source of substantial revenue; it could also make a profit for vakufs, and other concessions might be granted to sheep-farmers. In 1540, a survey carried out around the Diyarbakir and Maras areas found 8013 nomadic households with a combined flock of two million sheep – and a tax liability of one million akçes.

Careful measures were taken to ensure appropriate taxation on butchers, too, who might buy sheep for slaughter in April (just before the tax was due) which would have reduced the sheep-farmers liability.

Adet-i ağnam was one of the taxes that Yürük irregular troops were expected to pay, despite being exempted from other taxes when recruited.

== Background ==
The tax was paid to the Ottoman treasury. Because the tax went direct to the treasury, instead of local timar-holders, it is mentioned less often in tahrirs. Nonetheless, some tax records do show the annual revenue from adet-i ağnam in each district, and therefore show the number of sheep. For instance, in 1490, there were a total of 24509 sheep on Limnos – an average of 8.4 sheep per inhabitant. Sometimes, the annual adet-i ağnam charge would be rolled up with other taxes into a single composite annual tax including cizye and ispence - plus the tax-collector's fee.

There was a further tax on sheep, the ondalık, which was only levied in the province of Rumelia.

Unlike various other Ottoman taxes, adet-i ağnam continued after the Tanzimat reforms – alongside cizye, and a new income tax.
