= Emin (Ottoman official) =

Tax official in the Ottoman Empire

An emin was an officer in the Ottoman Empire; a "steward", the holder of an eminet, and often responsible for customs duties. Unlike a timar holder, an emin was a salaried official. Emins could operate outside the normal Ottoman bureaucracy; they were not necessarily Muslim.

== Emins as customs officers ==
The emin was usually a customs officer - that is to say, a gümrük emini; they were responsible for managing revenue from certain taxes, and collected duties on goods exported by foreigners. Although formally a tax official, the role of the emin (as with the role of other officials, such as the Kadi) could vary in practice; they might also be involved in consular, mediation, or even notarial work; and as a representative of the Ottoman state, could be authorised to apprehend Ottoman subjects who had committed crimes on foreign territory. As such, an emin resident in a foreign port that traded with the Ottoman empire could be valuable to both parties. An emin serving in a port could even act as a harbour-master or could prevent the export of restricted goods; in at least one case, Istanbul had to specifically instruct an emin to permit the export of a 27000 kg shipment of lead to be used by allies, which the emin had stopped in the port.

== Emins as government agents ==
An emin could also exercise government control over guilds - although if a guild's own rules were recognised by the sultan, then the rules could be enforced as law by a kadi.

The emin could also take the place of a tax-farmer, collecting a defined package of taxes, and might report back to central authority identifying new ways to increase tax take. The sultan might grant extensive powers to the emin to ensure that taxes were collected. The emin might also be appointed to project-manage major construction work, and would submit a full report on each project - with financial details.

Emins also supervised coin minting, to prevent the theft of silver, or other fraud by mint employees.

Emins might even be appointed as auditors, to investigate irregularities in tax collection performed by other officials; the emins could make recommendations on how to remedy the problem.
