= Muqata'ah =

Ottoman crown

Under the Ottoman Empire, Muqata'ah or Mukata'a were hass-ı hümayun, parcels of land owned by the Ottoman crown. These were distributed through the iltizam auction system; rights to collect revenue from the land were sold to the highest bidder, eventually for the life of the buyer. As the Ottoman Empire began to move into the early modern period, vacant timars, instead of being reassigned, were often added to the iltizam system, paving the way for a fundamental change in the Ottoman fiscal system into a monetized system, and allowing various power-brokers to involve themselves in the Ottoman bureaucracy, which had previously been limited to the kul.

This both opened up the echelons of power to those previously excluded, and also served to move power away from the sultan and to a larger group of nobles who now had a more permanent grasp on power, and the ability to perpetuate their wealth.

== History ==
In the Ottoman timar system, plots of land were assigned to sipahis, who taxed the peasants (reaya) on that land a portion of their crops every growing season. In return the sipahis served in the Sultan's army. Timars could be reassigned at any time, with promotions to more lucrative positions often entailing transfer to another province.

Mukata’a were under the control of their lease-holders for the term of the contract, eventually extending to life-terms. Unlike in timar, mukata’a revenues were collected in bullion, at least by the state, providing much-needed sources of currency to the Treasury.

== Role in the Ottoman Transformation ==
The move away from timar farming, and to privatized revenue collection, took place against the backdrop of massive upheaval in the 17th and early 18th century Ottoman Empire. Previously, the timar system had been supported by Ottoman military advances and newly conquered territories, opening up newly conquered territories to be assigned, as well as providing spoils of war to pay the troops, which encouraged continual campaigning. However, the slowing and eventual end of Ottoman territorial expansion put this era of easy land to an end. Around the same time, warfare and the Ottoman army faced drastic changes. Salaried infantry equipped with firearms replaced sipahi cavalrymen, and their tax levies. In 1695, malikane mukata’a, or life-term tax farms, were introduced, granting buyers the right to revenues on the parcel until the death of the holder, and freeing them from local oversight in exchange for incentivizing long-term growth. As the shift to mukata’a began to gain traction, a new class in Ottoman society began to emerge. With the privatization of annual revenue collection, wealthy officials, or those with the access to information that could make them wealthy in the new investing market for mukata’a, had the ability to turn corners of the Empire into their own private fiefdoms, exerting control through a network of agents. However, Ariel Salzmann identifies this phenomenon not as a loss of control for the center, but instead “rationalized state control in a politically effective form.” Malikane mukata’a contracts, thus, became a way to extend the definition of the center, allowing the wealthy across the empire to become part of the center, and “curb the power of local officials who often usurped the state’s prerogatives over taxation”. With the inclusion of elite from every corner of the empire, financed by Jewish, Greek and Armenian bankers, a new Ottoman ruling class emerged, open to any with the wealth or savvy to buy into the system.
