= Nüzül =

Tax in the Ottoman Empire

Nüzül was a tax in the Ottoman Empire.

== Mechanism ==
Nüzül was designed as a form of requisitioning from farms, to feed Ottoman armed forces; large quantities of food were needed to support Ottoman armies in the field. Flour was a major constituent in the 16th-17th century. Producers were expected to deliver nüzül to the required destination, and were not paid for this. Nüzül was supervised by the local kadis, an official who acted as both a judge and a tax-collector; Ottoman central government determined the kadi's jurisdiction, and set the levels of taxes to be collected - they were even required to arrange supplies of ship biscuit, in parallel with nüzül provision.

A waqf might be founded to help a specific community pay their nüzül and avariz obligations. Frontier areas, such as Bosnia, might be exempted from these tax obligations (much as some pastoral groups in the marcher-land were given tax exemptions on the understanding that they would raid enemy territory).

== History ==
Nüzül collection, as an irregular tax, began at least as early as the start of the 16th century. Initially, Nüzül was seen as an alternative to avariz, which was a cash tax; in times of war, villages might be required to supply food to army supply points, or they might be required to supply cash; but never both. Over time, this relationship changed, and both might be demanded. As with other Ottoman taxes, what was originally a requirement for payment "in kind" became a cash tax over time. A related concept was sursat, which was an obligation for food producers to sell food at prices dictated by central government.

Detailed Ottoman tax registers survive which show the levels and details of taxation in different provinces. Although the tax burden was very variable, nüzül and avariz were very important taxes in the 17th century - for instance, they represented 58% of all tax revenue in Manastir in 1621-1622 - but by the 18th century their importance had declined, and more money was collected through other taxes.
