= Temettu =

Ottoman income tax

Temettu was a tax introduced by the tanzimat reforms in the later Ottoman Empire.

Temettu was a tax on estimated (or presumed) business profits; it was mostly paid by merchants and artisans. An early form of temettu was attempted in 1839 (following a firman of 1838 which announced sweeping tax reforms), but it was impractical without detailed information on business incomes. A comprehensive approach to taxation of business profits in the Ottoman Empire – rather than the traditional method of taxing specific outputs or assets – only really became possible after a thorough cadastral survey was carried out from 1858 to 1860, which collected detailed information on the status of businesses throughout the empire. Immediately after this, a new temettu was set at 3%; in 1878 it was raised to 4% of estimated profit.

In 1886 the temettu was increased to 5%, and it was also applied to wages and salaries; for most of the Ottoman empire, this was the first real income tax, in the modern sense.

Temettu was paid annually; it was a graduated tax, with the rich liable to pay considerably more than the poor. By 1910, temettu revenue had reached 1 million livres per year; the same as tobacco and petrol duties, and less than the revenue from customs.

After early attempts at taxation, farmers who did not participate in commerce were eventually exempted from temettu. They paid other farm taxes instead, such as a new form of âşâr which was imposed as part of the same tax reforms. Foreigners were initially exempted, but there were later attempts to extract temettu payments from foreigners resident in the Ottoman empire. This extension of temettu was abolished in 1906 but later reinstated at the start of World War I and extended to foreigners in any profession.
