= Damga resmi =

The Damga resmi was a form of stamp duty in the Ottoman Empire.

During most of the Tanzimat period, it was one of the more effective sources of revenue in the Ottoman Empire. The original form of damga resmi was abolished in 1839 as part of a complex series of tax reforms following the Hatt-i Sharif, but a new type of damga resmi reappeared in 1845.

The damga resmi was originally a charge for the Muhtasib to place an official stamp of purity on gold and silver items (like a hallmark), and for placing an official stamp of authenticity on some manufactured goods, including textiles (also known as damga akmişe). The charge was usually set at a fortieth of the value of the goods (or 2.5%); sale without the muhtasib's stamp was prohibited, in order to protect revenue. It could be subject to tax-farming, or iltizam; an individual could buy the "right" to damga resmi fees from the public, in return for paying a lump sum to the state.

Some years after this earlier form of stamp duty had been abolished, the Ottoman treasury invented a replacement; a series of preprinted blank papers with official treasury stamps, which had to be used for almost all official legal and commercial documents (apart from some issued by religious courts). The papers could only be purchased for a considerable fee; a graduated scale of different fees was published, so that a small commercial contract might use a low-value paper, and a high-value contract must use a more expensive paper. This is similar to the stamp duty process adopted in some western European countries. Early revenue from the revised form of damga resmi was modest; perhaps 10-20 million akçes per year in the late 19th century, but this swelled to over 50 million akçes in 1912 – more than court charges or the muskirat resmi (spirit tax), but still dwarfed by the salt tax (tuz resmi).

Damga resmi has since been abolished.

== Etymology ==
The name is derived from the Turkic tamga, a stamp or symbol of a clan.

== See also ==
- Revenue stamp
- Stamped paper
