= Mawat =

Mawat may refer to:

- Mawat, Iraq, a town in Iraqi Kurdistan
- Rumah Mawat, a settlement in Sarawak
