= Resm-i arusane =

The resm-i arus, or resm-i arusane, was a feudal bride-tax in the Ottoman Empire. It was typically a fixed fee, a divani tax; it was paid around the time of marriage, to the timar-holder, or even to a tax-farmer in their stead. The tax-collector might record details of individual marriages, although this was not equivalent to the church marriage-registers in contemporary western Europe and some of the tax records are unclear.

Resm-i arusane is first recorded in the fifteenth century AD. Although it was arguably incompatible with the shari'ah law, the resm-i arusane continued to be a small, but significant, source of tax revenue in the Ottoman Empire. For instance, tax records for the village of Sakal Dutan in 1550 show a total 810 akçes of tax revenue, of which 30 akçe were from resm-i arusane. One 16th-century fatwa specifically stated that the resm-i arusane and the resm-i hinzir (pig tax) were illegal, but these taxes on "forbidden" transactions continued - sometimes under the guise of "gifts".

Various sources suggest that the fee was paid either by the bride or the husband; rates might vary according to the bride's personal status and religion. One preserved document sets resm-i arusane at double the rate for virgins compared to widows; and Muslim rates paid twice as much as unbelievers. The kannunname of Rhodos and Cos, in 1650, set resm-i arusane at 30 aspers for widows (regardless of their religion), and 60 aspers for virgins.

A Christian couple who wished to marry in a church would also have to pay nikâh resmi to the metropolitan, and a further fee to the local parish priest; this could be considerably more expensive than the resm-i arusane itself. There would also be a charge for registering the marriage with the government.
