= Malikâne =

Tax farming system in the Ottoman Empire

Malikâne was a form of tax farming introduced in the Ottoman Empire in 1695. It was intended as an improvement on the Iltizam system it replaced, in which a tax-farmer was responsible for a single year. Malikâne contracts were for life; this provided more security for the tax farmer (malikaneci) and a less exploitative relationship with the peasants; malikanecis might even make investments to improve productivity. However, vested interests - from existing mültezims who benefited from the Iltizam system - prevented wider adoption of malikâne. Also, malikâne could not be converted into vakf - an important distinction from mülk.

A malikâne tax-farm, typically for a village or district, would be auctioned to the highest bidder; in return for collecting all state taxes (rüsüm) from that area, the winner of the auction would make a large downpayment called muaccele, and then annual payments called mâl. The auction determined the initial payment - subject to a minimum price set by the treasury. A malikaneci might finance their initial payment by borrowing from a moneylender or sarraf - who would expect to take a cut of the tax revenue; this could even become a second layer of tax-farming.

The winner of the auction was given a document called "berat", as proof of their right to the tax-farm. In theory, when the tenant died their tax farm would revert to the state, but a tenant could give the tax-farm to an heir if the treasury agreed (and officials would expect to be paid for their agreement).

As the tax-farming market became more competitive, the treasury collected bigger payments, but profitability for tax-farmers decreased.

The malikâne system might have been modelled on an earlier system of "double rent" paid by waqfs.

From the treasury's perspective, malikâne was a more reliable source of revenue. Auctions of local tax-farming rights integrated diverse provincial tax-farmers into the Ottoman state, and also helped build a more modern concept of private landownership.
