= Resm-i çift =

The Resm-i Çift (Çift Akçesi or Çift resmi) was a tax in the Ottoman Empire. It was a tax on farmland, assessed at a fixed annual rate per çift, and paid by land-owning Muslims. Some Imams and some civil servants were exempted from the resm-i çift.

The tax was collected annually, on 1 March, from the holder of the timar or their tax-farmer. Some exemptions from resm-i çift were granted, but this was less common than exemptions from extraordinary taxes. Some of the sadat were initially considered exempt from taxes such as the resm-i çift, but this exemption ended in the 17th century; there were various exemptions for those involved in salt-making and mining.

The Çift is a measure of land area, derived from the word for "pair"; it is an area of farmland which can be ploughed by a pair of oxen - the equivalent of the Byzantine Zeugarion. It has been argued that the basic land tax in Asia Minor and the Balkans was directly copied from earlier Byzantine tax methods. A nim çift was half of that area (or half a yoke of oxen); a çiftli bennak was an area less than half; these terms match the Byzantine zeugarion, boidaton, and aktemon - and the rates of tax were initially similar.

In the 15th and 16th centuries, most taxpayers in the Ottoman Empire paid resm-i çift at a rate somewhere between 22 and 70 akçe; this could have been collected by a sipahi, as either a tax in kind or a cash tax. However, later centralised tax reforms led to cash payments of avâriz and nüzül replacing resm-i çift; this transition had begun by 1640. A typical defter record from the village of Eyucek in Antep shows that çiftliks held 10 çift, taxed at 40 akçe per çift, totalling 400 akçe; this, along with most of the village's other taxes (mostly taxes on individual crops), was paid to the fiefholder. Rates might vary for Muslims and nonmuslims; there are even instances of Muslim converts continuing to pay their "old" rate of tax. Landless peasants might pay Resm-i bennâk instead.
