= Avarız =

Avariz was a property tax in the Ottoman Empire, an annual cash tax paid by households registered in a defter.

== History ==
In early Ottoman history, the state depended on the timar system of feudal dues; but over time - especially due to the need to hire professional soldiers rather than peasants serving a feudal military obligation - more emphasis was placed on cash taxes, and avarız took over from the timar system. Avarız began in the late fifteenth century.

Initially, nüzül was seen as an alternative to avarız; nuzul was (in principle) a payment of food, in kind. In times of war, villages might be required to supply food to army supply points, or they might be required to supply cash; but never both. Over time, this relationship changed, and both might be demanded (whilst nüzül also became a cash tax).

Detailed Ottoman tax registers survive which show the levels and details of taxation in different provinces. Although the tax burden was very variable, nüzül and avarız were very important taxes in the 17th century - for instance, they represented 58% of all tax revenue in Manastir in 1621-1622 - but by the 18th century their importance had declined, and more money was collected through other taxes. Technically the registers were counting property not people, with an urban register for Damascus documenting each dwelling in the city and even the condition of the property. It however also identified the owners and they were the ones liable to be taxed.

An avarızhane was a household defined for tax purposes. Initially, this was equivalent to one gercekhane (i.e. a real household), but over time, taxpayers were aggregated into larger groups; by the seventeenth century, an avarızhane might include several households, or gercekhanes.

Avarız might be collected through an Iltizam.

== Avarız as a category of taxes ==
The name "Avarız" was also used as a blanket term for cash taxes levied by central government, or avariz-i divaniye. The term later came to be used for one specific tax.

== Difficulties and exemptions ==
Occasionally the tax burden could be heavy, provoking rebellion. Some waqfs were founded to help communities pay their nüzül and avarız obligations each year.

The Ottoman Empire had a complex system of tax exemptions, and avarız was no exception. Various groups were exempted from avarız on the basis of lineage, public service by favoured professions, and sometimes a district's an exceptional inability to pay (for instance, if the district had already paid heavily towards other taxes, or been ravaged by warfare). The most common exemption was for villages which had been assigned guard duties.
