= 1042 =

1042 in various calendars
- Gregorian calendar: 1042; MXLII
- Ab urbe condita: 1795
- Armenian calendar: 491; ԹՎ ՆՂԱ
- Assyrian calendar: 5792
- Balinese saka calendar: 963–964
- Bengali calendar: 448–449
- Berber calendar: 1992
- English Regnal year: N/A
- Buddhist calendar: 1586
- Burmese calendar: 404
- Byzantine calendar: 6550–6551
- Chinese calendar: 辛巳年 (Metal Snake); 3739 or 3532 — to — 壬午年 (Water Horse); 3740 or 3533
- Coptic calendar: 758–759
- Discordian calendar: 2208
- Ethiopian calendar: 1034–1035
- Hebrew calendar: 4802–4803
- Hindu calendars
- Vikram Samvat: 1098–1099
- Shaka Samvat: 963–964
- Kali Yuga: 4142–4143
- Holocene calendar: 11042
- Igbo calendar: 42–43
- Iranian calendar: 420–421
- Islamic calendar: 433–434
- Japanese calendar: Chōkyū 3 (長久３年)
- Javanese calendar: 945–946
- Julian calendar: 1042; MXLII
- Korean calendar: 3375
- Minguo calendar: 870 before ROC 民前870年
- Nanakshahi calendar: −426
- Seleucid era: 1353/1354 AG
- Thai solar calendar: 1584–1585
- Tibetan calendar: ལྕགས་མོ་སྦྲུལ་ལོ་ (female Iron-Snake); 1168 or 787 or 15 — to — ཆུ་ཕོ་རྟ་ལོ་ (male Water-Horse); 1169 or 788 or 16

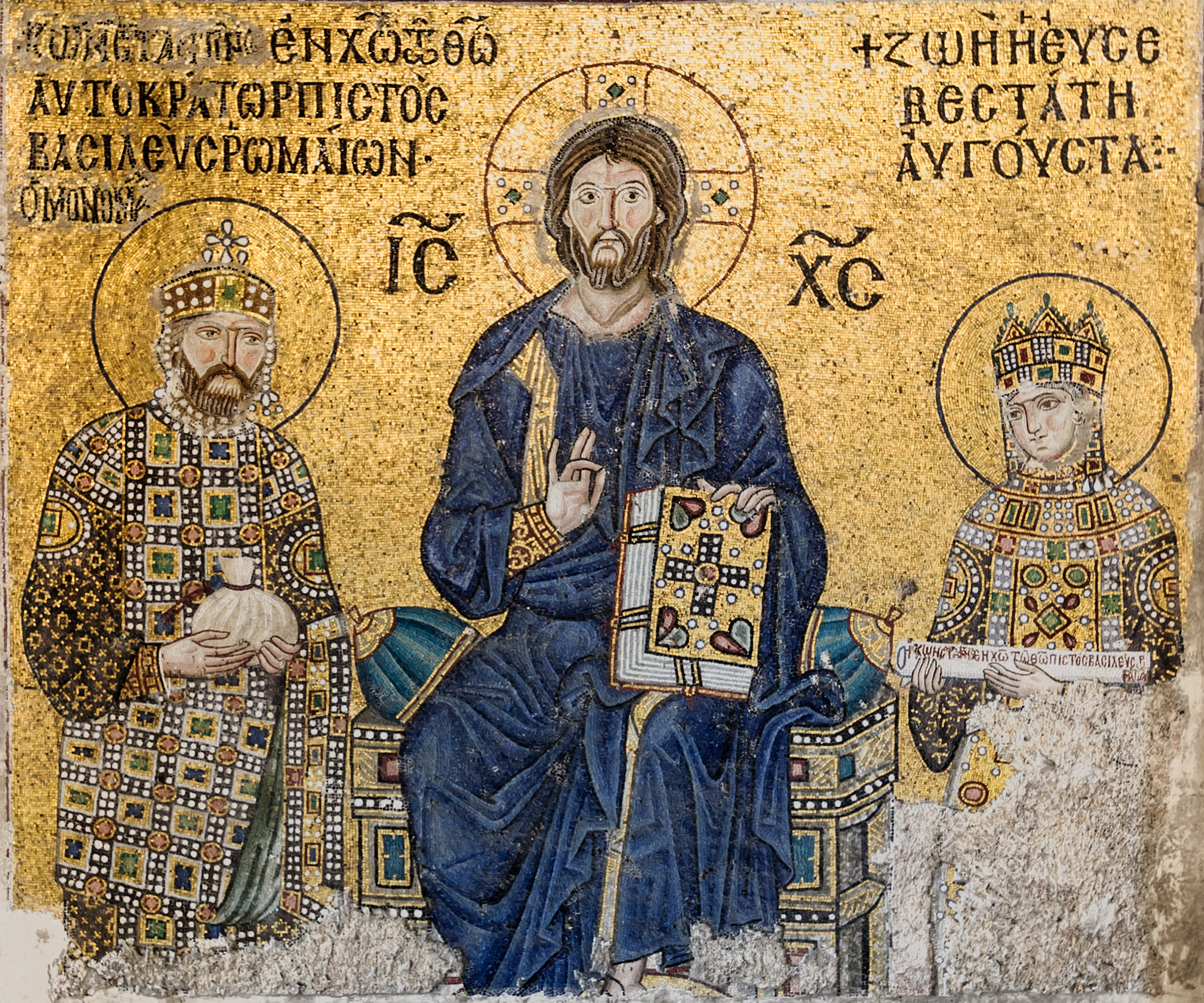
Christ Pantocrator flanked by Empress Zoë and Emperor Constantine IX (left).

Year 1042 (MXLII) was a common year starting on Friday of the Julian calendar.

== Events ==
=== By place ===
==== Byzantine Empire ====
- April 19 – Emperor Michael V Kalaphates banishes his adoptive mother and co-ruler Zoë, for plotting to poison him, to the island of Principo. His announcement as sole emperor leads to a popular revolt.
- April 20 – Zoë is proclaimed as empress at an assembly in Hagia Sophia, along with her sister Theodora, as co-ruler. Michael V flees to the monastery of Stoudios, but is arrested, blinded and castrated.
- Zoë recalls Synodianos, governor of the Catepanate of Italy, and replaces him with George Maniakes (the disgraced head of the Sicilian campaign). All of Apulia is in the hands of the Lombard rebels.
- June 11 – Zoë marries her third husband, a Byzantine bureaucrat who ascends as co-emperor Constantine IX at Constantinople. Theodora agrees to surrender her co-emperorship.
- Summer – George Maniakes goes on a march through Apulia, plundering the towns that have declared for the Lombard rebels. Constantine IX recalls Maniakes to Constantinople.
- George Maniakes revolts against Constantine IX and is declared emperor by his troops. He captures Pardos who has landed with an army at Otranto to take over his command.
- Byzantine–Arab War: The Byzantines reconquer the fortress city of Edessa (modern Turkey), returning it to Christian hands, after 400 years of Islamic rule (approximate date).
- Duklja secures its independence from the Byzantine Empire.

==== Europe ====
- January 25 – Abbad I dies after a 19-year reign as independent ruler of the Taifa of Seville in Al-Andalus (modern Spain). He is succeeded by his son Abbad II (until 1069).
- Casimir I, duke of Poland, succeeds in reuniting the realm which earns him the name "the Restorer". He signs a treaty with Bretislav I, duke of Bohemia, at Regensburg.
- June 8 – Magnus the Good becomes king of Denmark after the death of Harthacnut. Despite a claim to the throne by Sweyn II, Magnus takes control of Denmark.
- Autumn – Norman mercenaries assemble at Matera and decide to elect William Iron Arm as count of Melfi and leader of the Normans in Southern Italy.
- Harald Hardrada, leader of the Varangian Guard in the Byzantine Empire, returns to Norway, possibly because of his involvement in Maniakes' revolt.
- Finnish–Novgorodian War: Grand Prince Vladimir Yaroslavich wages a campaign against the Tavastians (yem).

==== England ====
- June 8 – King Harthacnut collapses and dies while attending a party. His half-brother Edward the Confessor becomes king of England.

==== Islamic world ====
- The Almoravids, led by Abdallah ibn Yasin, invade Morocco (approximate date).

== Births ==
- Bolesław II the Generous, king of Poland (approximate date)
- Canute IV ("the Holy"), king of Denmark (approximate date)
- Fujiwara no Morozane, Japanese nobleman and regent (d. 1101)
- Gissur Ísleifsson, Icelandic clergyman and bishop (d. 1118)
- Johannes of Jerusalem, French monk and abbot (d. 1119)
- Louis the Springer, German nobleman (d. 1123)
- Minamoto no Yoshitsuna, Japanese samurai (d. 1134)
- Sancho V, king of Aragon and Pamplona (d. 1094)

== Deaths ==
- January 25 – Abbad I, founder of the Abbadid dynasty (b. 984)
- June 8 – Harthacnut, king of Denmark and England
- August 24 – Michael V Kalaphates, Byzantine emperor
- Anushtakin al-Dizbari, Fatimid governor of Aleppo
- Pardos, Byzantine governor (catepan) of Italy
