= Siege of Messina (1041) =

- Part of the Arab–Byzantine wars
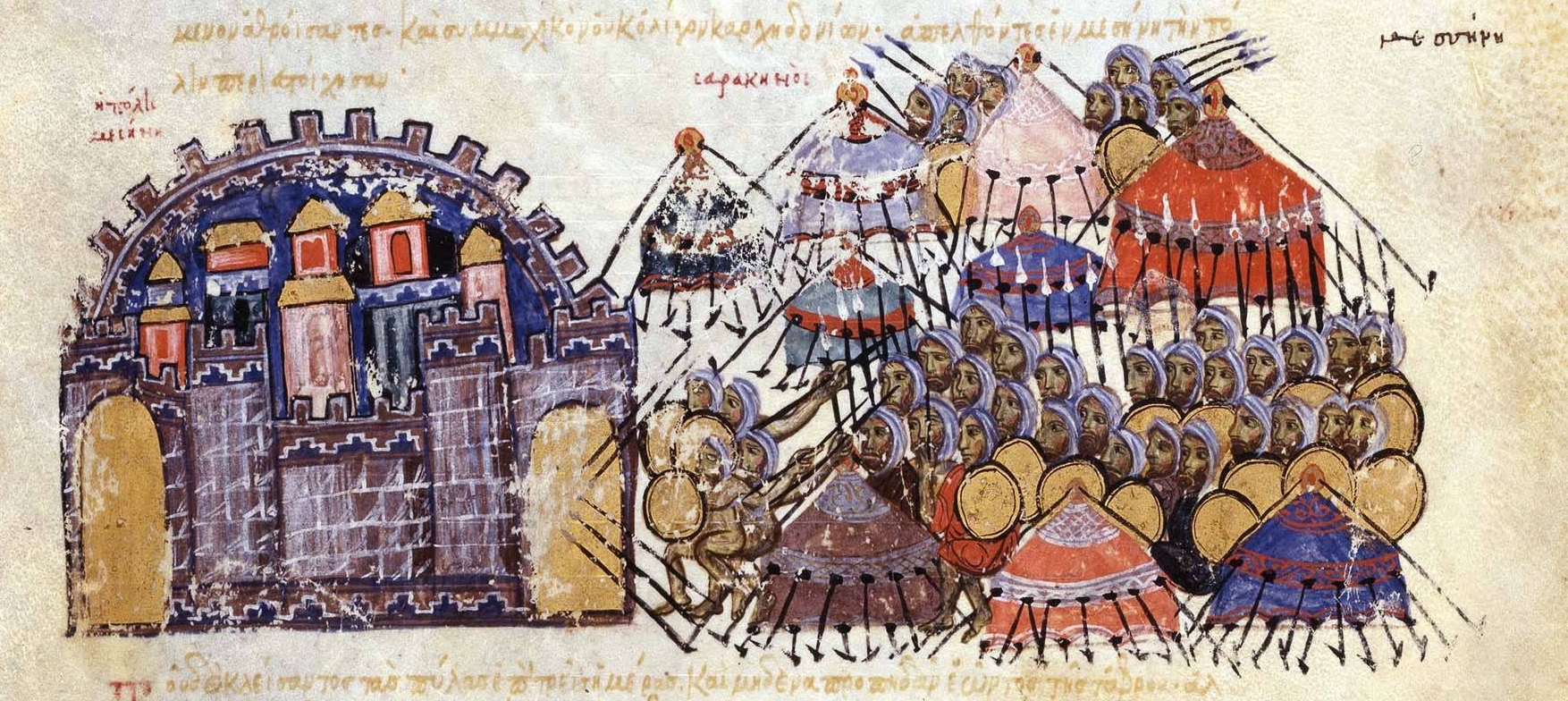
- Katakalon Kekaumenos' defence of Messina, as depicted in John Skylitzes' illustrated text
Date	1041
Location	Messina, Sicily
Result	Byzantine victory

Belligerents
Byzantine Empire	Zirid Dynasty; Kalbid Emirate

Commanders and leaders
Katakalon Kekaumenos	Unknown commander †

Strength
Total: 800 men; 300 cavalry; 500 infantry (Note: There exists some academic debate on whether the infantry figure provided by Skylitzes should be interpreted as 50 or 500. Georgios Theotokis reasons that the latter figure is more likely.)	Large army

Casualties and losses
Unknown	Tens of thousands (according to John Skylitzes)

The Siege of Messina was conducted in 1041 by the forces of the Zirid dynasty and Kalbid Emirate against a defending Byzantine force led by Katakalon Kekaumenos. After a previously successful campaign which saw much of Eastern Sicily return to Muslim control, the Arab forces attempted to drive the Byzantines from their final holding at Messina. After a siege lasting four days, Kekaumenos led his men in a sortie and surprised the Arab army. The Byzantines won a major victory and killed the Arab commander, though this success could not reverse the ultimate return of Sicily to Zirid and Kalbid control.

== Background ==
From 1038–1040, the Byzantine strategos George Maniakes had led a highly successful expedition to Sicily, conquering the eastern parts of the island, including the city of Syracuse. Although Maniakes then defeated a Zirid counteroffensive at Dranginai, his political position deteriorated shortly thereafter due to his dispute with Stephen Calaphates, the admiral of the expeditionary fleet and brother-in-law of Emperor Michael IV, over the failure of the latter to intercept the retreating Zirids when they sailed to Africa. After being punished for his performance, Stephen sent a dispatch to the emperor's brother, John the Orphanotrophos, that claimed Maniakes was plotting against him and the emperor. As the imperial government was at this time facing the uprising of Bulgarians under Petar Delyan, they became apprehensive of an additional insurrection by Maniakes, and thus ordered his arrest and return from Sicily to Constantinople. Stephen was then elevated to commander of the Byzantine forces in Sicily, along with the eunuch Basil Pediadites.

However, the majority of the units formerly under Maniakes' command were gradually sent from Sicly to other theatres, both against the Bulgarians and the Byzantines' former allies, the Normans and Lombards, who in late 1040 had deserted the Byzantine forces in Sicily to initiate a revolt in Apulia. Stephen and Basil Pediadadites further worsened the military situation with incompetent leadership, and their conduct caused friction between the Byzantines and local Sicilians, with whom Maniakes had previously established positive relations. Stephen and Basil later withdrew with most of their forces to Italy to contain Norman advances. The depletion of the Byzantine forces in turn enabled the people of Sicily to launch their own rebellion, and with the aid of Zirid troops that joined them, they began to drive the imperial garrisons out of their recently captured territories, tearing down the fortifications built under Maniakes' direction and reoccupying the towns. Within months, Zirid and Sicilian rebel forces overwhelmed and defeated most of what remained of the Byzantines and recaptured the eastern portions of the island, with the exception of Messina.

== Katakalon Kekaumenos' defence of Messina ==
After evicting the Byzantines from most of Eastern Sicily, the Arab-Sicilian forces advanced against Messina. This location had been the first in Sicily captured by George Maniakes in 1038, and was now garrisoned by Protospatharios Katakalon Kekaumenos. Kekaumenos had a body of 300 cavalrymen and 500 infantry drawn from the Armeniakon theme with him in the town, but was heavily outnumbered by the advancing enemy. When the Arabs arrived, Kekaumenos shut the gates and gave the order that no man be allowed to leave Messina. Kekaumenos and his men remained within the city for three days, which the Sicilians, following their earlier successes in recapturing settlements, perceived to be a sign of Byzantine cowardice. The overconfident Arab forces consequently began to indulge in consumption of alcohol and celebrated their impending victory with music and dance.

Having observed the lax discipline of the Arab-Sicilian army, on the morning of the fourth day of the siege Kekaumenos led his men in an unnexpected sortie upon the enemy, many of whom were incapacitated from their celebration the previous night. Having been caught completely by surprise, the Arabs were unable to offer effective resistance against the fully equipped Byzantines. Leading from the front, Kekaumenos led his cavalry directly against the tent of the Arab commander and succeeded in killing him, before cutting down his tent. Seeing this, the remainder of the Arab-Sicilian army attempted to flee, though many whom were still intoxicated, struggled to escape, and tripped over the corpses of their slain comrades, becoming trampled underfoot in the panicked rout. According to John Skylitzes, tens of thousands of Arabs had been killed by the time Kekaumenos finished his pursuit, with the surrounding plain, ravines and rivers being covered with their bodies, as only a small number survived and reached the safety of Palermo. Following the victory, Kekaumenos' men plundered the Sicilian encampment, collecting large amounts of silver and gems as loot.

== Aftermath ==
Although the victory of Kekaumenos had checked the advance of the Sicilian Arabs and prevented the complete elimination of Byzantine presence in 1041, the ongoing fighting against rebel forces across the Empire prevented Michael IV from organising a new expedition to exploit the success in Sicily. In immediate response to the developments, Stephen dismissed from command due to his failure to contain the Arabs in Sicily and the Lombard-Norman forces in Italy and returned to Constantinople in disgrace. His replacement as catepan of Italy was Michael Dokeianos, who proved an equally incompetent leader and sustained a series of defeats against the Normans at Olivento and Montemaggiore. Kekaumenos remained in command at Messina for some time following the siege, but he subsequently departed and had returned to Constantinople by April 20 1042. The Byzantines likely withdrew from Messina before or shortly after this date, and by the end of 1042 the entirety of Sicily thus reverted to Arab rule.

== Bibliography ==
- Alex Metcalfe (2009). The Muslims of Medieval Italy (illustrated ed.). Edinburgh University Press. p. 142. ISBN 978-0-7486-2008-1.
- Hollway, Don (2021). The Last Viking. Bloomsbury. p. 157. ISBN 9781472846518.
- Wortley, John, ed. (2010). John Skylitzes: A Synopsis of Byzantine History, 811–1057. Cambridge: Cambridge University Press. ISBN 978-0-521-76705-7.
- Treadgold, Warren (1997). A History of the Byzantine State and Society. Stanford, California: Stanford University Press. ISBN 978-0804779371.
- Kaldellis, Anthony (2017). Streams of Gold, Rivers of Blood: The Rise and Fall of Byzantium, 955 A.D. to the First Crusade. Oxford University Press. ISBN 978-0190253226.
- Biały, Kamil (2016). "From Conquest to the Failed Usurpation: Career of a Typical Byzantine Commander George Maniakes". Proslogion: Studies in Medieval and Early Modern Social History and Culture. Vol. 14. pp. 171–185.
- Shepard, Jonathan (1979). "Byzantium's Last Sicilian Expedition: Scylitzes' Testimony". Rivista di Studi Bizantini e Neoellenici. Nuova Serie. 14–16 (XXIV–XXVI). Istituto di Studi Bizantini e Neoellenici, Università di Roma: 145–159.
- Theotokis, Georgios; Mesko, Marek (2020). War in Eleventh-Century Byzantium. Taylor & Francis. ISBN 9780429576881.
