= Drogo of Hauteville =

Second Count of Apulia and Calabria

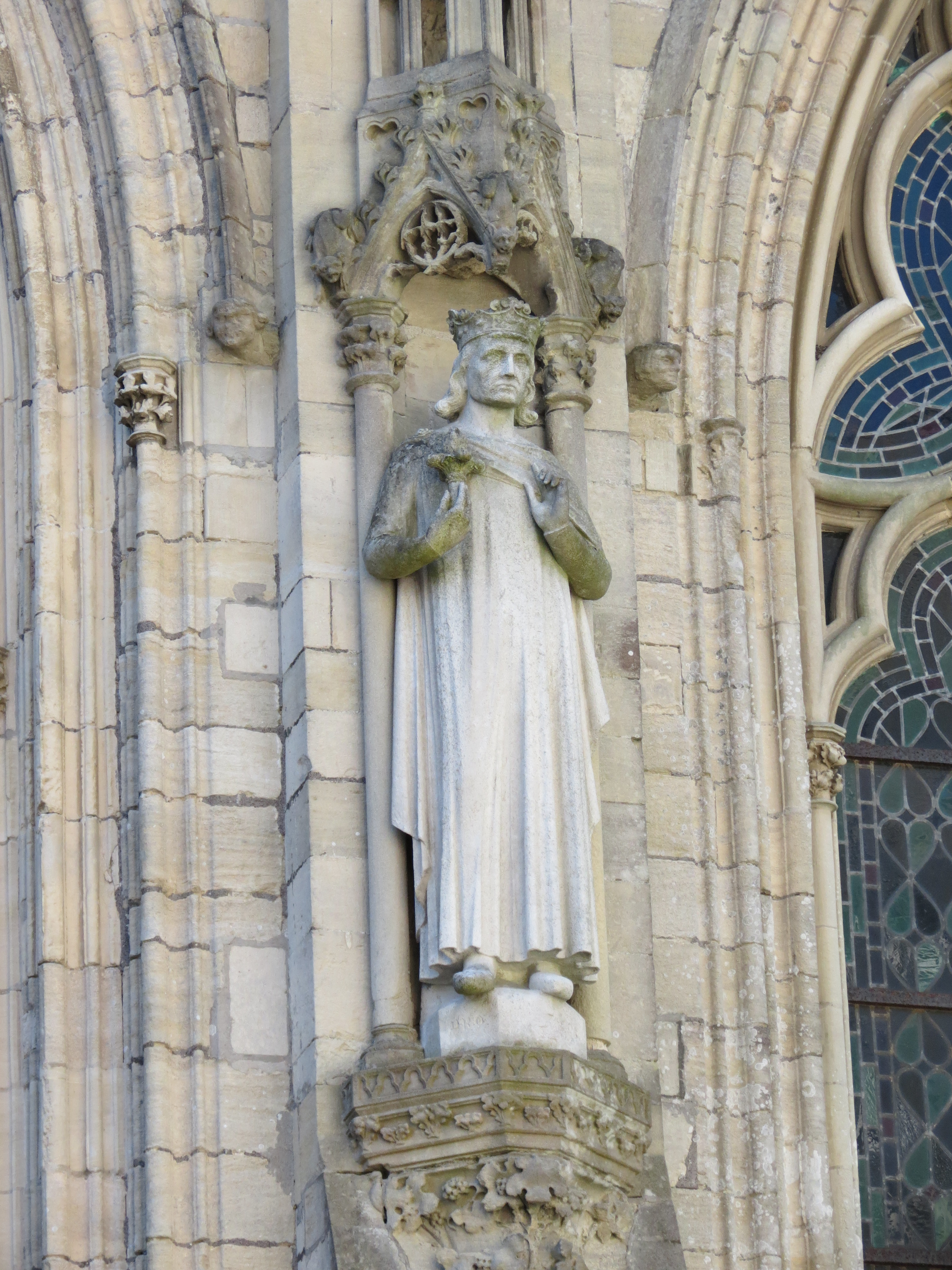
- Statue of Drogo outside Coutances Cathedral

Count of Apulia and Calabria
- Reign: 1046 - 10 August 1051
- Predecessor: William Iron Arm
- Successor: Humphrey
- Died: 10 August 1051
- Noble family: Hauteville
- Spouses: Altrude; Gaitelgrima
- Issue: Richard; Rocca; Eremburga
- Father: Tancred
- Mother: Muriella

Military service
- Battles/wars: Arab-Byzantine wars; Battle of Messina; Reconquest of Syracuse; Battle of Dranginai

Drogo of Hauteville (died 10 August 1051) was the second Norman Count of Apulia. He led the Normans of Southern Italy after the death of his brother, William Iron Arm.

== Life ==
Drogo was a son of Tancred of Hauteville by his first wife Muriella. Goffredo Malaterra records him as being the second son, after William Iron Arm, while Romuald Guarna records him as being the third, coming after Serlo and Geoffrey. Regardless, it is unlikely anyway that Drogo was older than Serlo, as Serlo stayed in Normandy to inherit their father's possessions, while Drogo journeyed to Southern Italy.

Since Tancred had many sons, and his possessions were not enough to satisfy all of them, Drogo and many of his brothers were soon forced to seek fortune elsewhere.

=== First years in Southern Italy ===
Around 1035/7, Drogo journeyed to Southern Italy with his brothers William Iron Arm and Humphrey, to strengthen the ranks of Rainulf Drengot, Count of Aversa, the first Norman mercenary lord who had been granted a fief. Together with Rainulf, the Hauteville brothers took part in a military operation led by Guaimar IV of Salerno against Pandulf IV, Prince of Capua.

With time, Drogo and his brothers put themselves under the direct service of Guaimar IV. Under Guaimar's authority, Norman and Lombard forces under Arduin served the Byzantine army under George Maniakes in an attempt to conquer Sicily from the Saracens. Drogo participated in the Battle of Messina and the reconquest of Syracuse. However, after the Battle of Troina the Lombard and Norman force left the expedition because of a dispute in dividing the spoils. In 1040, they joined a Lombard rebellion in Apulia, this time against the Byzantines.

During said rebellion, Drogo's brother William Iron Arm had managed to keep the Normans under his control, and was the key to many victories. Thus, in September 1042, William was nominated Count of all the Normans in Apulia, with the Norman capital in Melfi. His title and territories were recognized by Guaimar IV; In turn, William declared himself Guimar's vassal, as Guaimar assumed the title of Duke of Apulia and Calabria. In this occasion, Drogo was given Venosa. He took advantage of his new possession, and also occupied Bovino in 1045.

=== Count of Apulia and Calabria ===
When William Iron Arm died childless in 1046, Drogo succeeded him as Count of Apulia after fighting for the title with Peter I of Trani. Guaimar IV of Salerno acknowledged Drogo's succession, and gave him his daughter's hand in marriage. Drogo's legitimacy grew significantly when Emperor Henry III came to Southern Italy in 1047: Drogo paid homage to the Emperor on 3 February, and Henry III confirmed the possession of his territories and invested him as "Dux et magister totius italiae comesque Normannorum totius Apuliae et Calabriae", which translates to "Duke and master of all of Italy, and Count of all the Normans in Apulia and Calabria". Henry III, however, did not recognize Guaimar IV's title of "Duke of Apulia", and stripped him of it, theoretically meaning that Drogo wasn't subject to Guaimar's control anymore.

During Drogo's tenure as Count, between 1046 and 1047, his half-brother Robert Guiscard arrived in Southern Italy. Drogo, however, welcomed him coldly, not granting him any fief and sending him to Calabria to get him out of the way, probably fearing his competition for the County. Drogo also initially refused to allow Robert's marriage with Alberada of Buonalbergo. If we consider that Robert and Alberada's marriage was later annulled on the grounds of consanguinity, Drogo might have had actual reasons; however, the claim of consanguinity is usually regarded as an excuse to divorce.

At one point during his reign, Drogo imprisoned Richard Drengot, one of the contenders for succession to the County of Aversa. The reason for Richard's eventual release is unclear. According to Amatus of Montecassino, Guaimar IV of Salerno pressured Drogo to free him. Alternatively, Drogo might have kept Richard prisoner in order for William Bellabocca, regent of Aversa and possibly a relative of Drogo, to keep his power. If this is the case, Drogo probably released Richard after the Aversans expelled Bellabocca, as keeping him prisoner no longer served a purpose.

=== Death and succession ===
Towards the end of his reign, Drogo met with Pope Leo IX, when he came to Southern Italy to restore the Libertas Ecclesiae under Henry III's directives. However, as he was returning from the meeting with the Pope, he was assassinated along with several of his followers on Saint Lawrence's Day (10 August) of 1051, while he was entering the chapel of his castle at Monte Ilario, near Bovino, to attend mass. Goffredo Malaterra records that he was killed by a Lombard man of his entourage. Drogo was possibly the victim of an anti-Norman conspiracy led by Argyrus, the Byzantine catepan of Italy, who was trying to reclaim the region for the Byzantine Empire. Drogo was buried at the Abbey of Santissima Trinità of Venosa.

He was succeeded by his brother Humphrey.

== Issue ==
Drogo's first wife was named Altrude. With her, he had three children:

- Richard of Hauteville
- Rocca
- Eremburga

Drogo's second wife was Gaitelgrima, daughter of Guaimar IV of Salerno (not the same as this Gaitelgrima, who was princess of Capua). No children result from this marriage.

== Sources ==
- H. M. Gwatkin and J. P. Whitney, edd. The Cambridge Medieval History, vol. 3. Cambridge: Cambridge University Press, 1926.
- John Julius Norwich. The Normans in the South, 1016–1130. London: Longmans, 1967.
- Ferdinand Chalandon. Histoire de la domination normande en Italie et en Sicilie. Paris: 1907.
- Christopher Gravett and David Nicolle. The Normans: Warrior Knights and their Castles. Oxford: Osprey Publishing, 2006.
- George Beech. A Norman-Italian Adventurer in the East: Richard of Salerno. 1993.
- Theotokis, Georgios (15 March 2021). Bohemond of Taranto: Crusader and Conqueror. Pen and Sword Military. p. 15. ISBN 978-1-5267-4429-6.

Preceded by William I	Count of Apulia and Calabria; 1046–1051	Succeeded by Humphrey
