= Campaign for Syracuse (1038–1040) =

- Part of the Arab–Byzantine wars
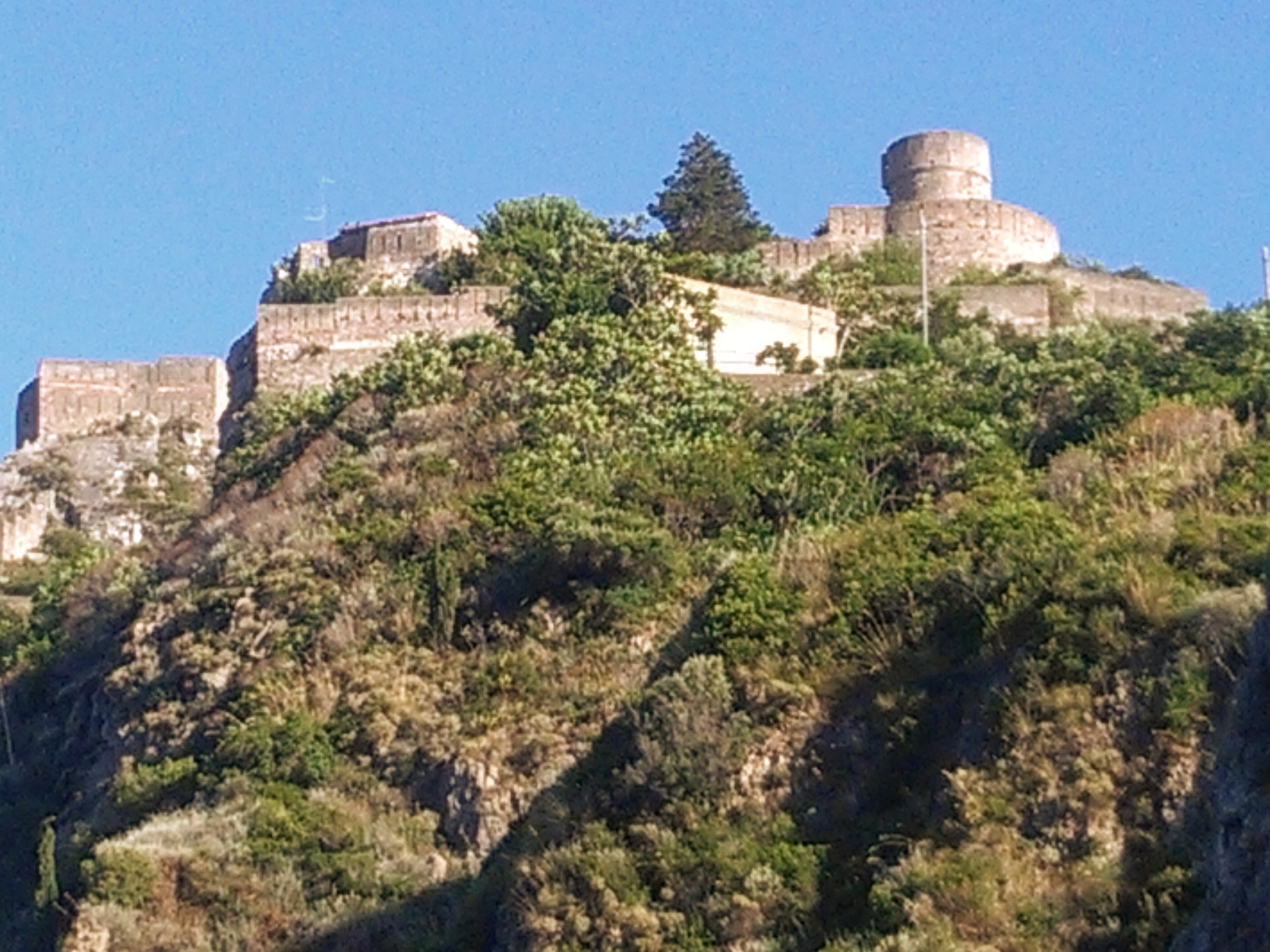
- Byzantine era fortress at Sant'Alessio Siculo in Eastern Sicily
| Date | Late 1038 – spring 1040 |
| Location | Syracuse, Sicily |
| Result | Byzantine victory |
| Territorial changes | Ephemeral reconquest of Eastern Sicily by the Byzantines |

Belligerents
| Byzantine Empire | Zirid Dynasty; Kalbid Emirate |

Commanders and leaders
| George Maniakes; Katakalon Kekaumenos; Harald Sigurdsson (WIA); Arduin the Lombard; Rainulf Drengot; Drogo of Hauteville; William Iron Arm; Basil Pediadites; Stephen; Úlfr Óspaksson (WIA); Halldor Snorrason (WIA) | Archadius the Caid † |

Strength
| Total: 10,000–15,000; 1,000 Varangian Guards; 2,000 Italian recruits and auxiliaries; 300–500 Normans | Unknown |

Casualties and losses
| Unknown | Heavy |

The Campaign for Syracuse was an initiative of the Byzantine Empire to recapture Syracuse and the surrounding settlements in Eastern Sicily, during the expedition led by George Maniakes from 1038 to 1040. After over a year of warfare and the capture of 13 towns and cities, the Byzantine expedition succeeded in capturing the city of Syracuse. The claimed martial feats performed by the Varangian Guard and their leader Harald Sigurdsson, as well as the Norman mercenaries of the Byzantine army over the course of the campaign became memorised and celebrated in medieval chronicles.

== Background ==
In 1038, the Emperor Michael IV had organised an expedition to recapture the island if Sicily for Byzantium, which would be placed under the leadership of Maniakes. After a successful landing at Messina, the Byzantines sought to extend their reach into the island. Later in the year, Maniakes scored a significant victory over an Arab army near Rometta, which for the time being checked the efforts of the Kalbids and Zirids to conduct counterattacks against the Byzantines from western Sicily. With his western flank secure, Maniakes began a gradual advance southwards in over the following months to secure the eastern parts of the island. The ultimate objective of this campaign was the capture of the city of Syracuse from the Kalbids, but this venture required the conquest of numerous fortresses and fortified towns before a siege of Syracuse could be undertaken. Maniakes pursued a strategy of detaching contingents of his army to garrison and fortify each of the captured settlements, while taking measures to secure support from the Sicilian populaces that surrendered. Following this methodical approach, the Byzantines would have to engage in over a year of fighting against Arab strongholds in the region before an attack on Syracuse would be feasible.

== Campaign in Eastern Sicily ==
=== Harald Sigurdsson's first capture of a Sicilian settlement ===
According to John Skylitzes, in the fighting that followed the Battle of Rometta, Maniakes captured 13 forts and towns in Eastern Sicily from the Saracens. Details on these exploits are scarce in the Byzantine sources, but the 13th century Icelandic chronicler Snorri Sturluson illuminates the possible role played by the exiled Norwegian prince Harald Sigurdsson (at the time captain of the Byzantine Varangian Guard) in the capture of Kalbid fortresses in his Heimskringla, which included materials from the earlier Morkinskinna.

According to Sturluson, after plundering Kalbid territory, the Byzantine army arrived before a large and populous town, which they surrounded and invested as the fortifications were too formidable to risk a direct assault. The situation of the besiegers was difficult, as the garrison had stored adequate supplies in the settlement to withstand a lengthy siege. Supposedly, Harald noticed that birds which nested in the town would fly out into the nearby woods every day to feed before returning to the settlement. Harald thus ordered his men to capture some of the birds, to which the Varangians attached wood shavings, sulphur and wax. When a sufficient amount of the birds had been caught, these attachments were ignited and the birds were released. When they reached their nests in the roofs of the settlement, the thatch lodgings caught on fire and quickly developed a conflagration which spread throughout the town. To escape, the citizens were forced to flee from the settlement and beg the Varangians for mercy. The Byzantines spared those who surrendered, and seized the town. (Note: Some modern historians cast doubt on this story recorded by Sturluson, as similar stratagems involving the capture and ignition of birds are recorded being used by Alexander the Great and other figures before Harald Sigurdsson's alleged exploit.)

=== Harald Sigurdsson's second capture of a Sicilian settlement ===
Another story related by Sturluson concerned a siege of a city (possibly Catania) surrounded by an arid plain. Supposedly, the town was so well defended and fortified that Maniakes opted to bypass it and continue his advance along the coast, where his army could by supplied by the Byzantine navy. However, Harold Sigurdsson resolved to capture the settlement after Maniakes agreed that he and his Varangians would have the first share of the loot from the city. The Varangians proceeded to find a nearby ravine, from which they began a tunneling operation. As undermining operations were well known methods in Byzantine siege warfare, modern historian Don Hollway reasons that this was in truth part of Maniakes' strategy rather than Harald's original idea, with the hardy Varangians being assigned the task of mining beneath the fortifications. Eventually, the Varangians dug a tunnel long enough to extend beneath the interior of the settlement, and proceeded to dig upwards. The Varangians emerged through the floor of a hall, wherein the Arab citizens of the town were feasting. Harald's men completely surprised the citizens and massacred large numbers of them before advancing to the city gates from the inside. They seized the gates and opened them, allowing the rest of the Byzantine army to capture and sack the town. On the basis of the Morkinskinna, Maniakes attempted to breach his deal to hand over to Harald his share of the loot, but capitulated to the Varangians' demands when other elements of the Byzantine army supported him.

=== Reconquest of Syracuse ===
After capturing over a dozen settlements, Maniakes' expeditionary force finally arrived before the city of Syracuse. According to Goffredo Malaterra, the Arab garrison of Syracuse sallied out and engaged the Byzantines in a frontal battle beneath the walls. The Kalbid ruler of Syracuse, named Archadius the Caid in Malaterra's text, led a fierce attack against Maniakes' men and managed to personally cut down multiple of the Byzantines' Norman mercenaries. Enraged by the heavy losses, the Norman commander William Iron Arm engaged Archadius in combat, and managed to kill him. This action contributed to the failure of the Kalbid sally, and earned William respect from both the Byzantines and his Arab opponents.

Following this engagement, the Byzantines invested Syracuse in a siege. Once again, the Heimskringla and Morkinskinna offer further details in their description of the siege of the largest and most well defended settlement in Sicily, which Don Hollway identifies with Syracuse. Despite the defeat and death of Archadius outside Syracuse, the defenders of the city were still confident in their own strength, as the city maintained a large garrison and possessed formidable fortifications. Maniakes was thus forced to blockade Syracuse and starve the defenders. According to the Heimskringla, Maniakes' resolve once again faltered and the strategos was again on the point of withdrawing until Harald encouraged him to persevere, offering to capture the city with his Varangians in return for possession of the loot, taken in a similar arrangement as detailed for the previous siege. To achieve this, Harald again devised stratagems and ordered his men to play sports beneath the city walls each day, in full view of the Arab defenders, but outside the range of their weaponry. After continuing this mundane routine for some days, the defenders became apathetic and began lowering their guard, even leaving the gate open. Eventually, Harald and his lieutenants, Ulf and Halldor, conducted the same sporting activity with their men but brought weaponry concealed under their tunics, and upon reaching close proximity they launched a surprise assault. The Varangians seized the gate and allowed the Byzantine army to fight its way into Syracuse and take the city by storm.

Snorri also provides a second version of the capture of the city as was preserved in the Morkinskinna, where Harald became afflicted with an illness and began spreading the news that he was ill. Eventually, through the use of spies and verbal altercations with besieging Byzantine soldiers, the news reached the defenders. The false claim that Harald had succumbed to his illness was spread, after which his men dispatched emissaries to the defenders seeking a truce, requesting permission to bring their leader to a church inside the city and give him a funeral, laying him to rest with the loot collected by the Varangians during the expedition. The Syracusans permitted this under the condition that only 12 of the Varangians, including Ulf and Halldor, be allowed inside the walls to carry Harald's coffin within the walls. These men brought the coffin into the settlement dressed in mourning attire of silk tunics and broad hats, but underneath these they wore concealed equipment. When they entered through the gate, the Varangians dropped the coffin, which was a signal for the rest of the Byzantine army to conduct an attack. Under the sound of a trumpet, the Byzantine soldiers rushed to storm the gateway, while Harald emerged from his coffin and joined his retainers. The townspeople crowded near the gateway now entered a chaotic fray, and as the 13 Varangians had no shields, they wrapped their cloaks around their left arms to protect them from the attacks of the Arab garrison. Harald's standard bearer was killed while the rest, including Harald himself, were injured. (Note: According to the Morkinskinna, Harald fought a duel with the ruler of the city in the fighting near the gateway, though this is at odds with Malaterra's version wherein Willian Iron Arm killed the emir.) Nonetheless, the Varangians held the gateway long enough for the rest of the Byzantine army to arrive, who proceeded to storm and sack the city, massacring the inhabitants. Thus, Maniakes had finally succeeded in capturing Syracuse, which he proceeded to refortify.

== Aftermath ==
Following the capture of Syracuse, the Zirid emir of Sicily Abdullah ibn-Muizz mounted a military response against the Byzantines in summer 1040, leading a large army to battle at Dranginai. Although the Byzantines achieved victory again, internal and political dissentions developed in the Byzantine army soon after. The poor performance of Archon Stephen, commander of the Byzantine fleet in Sicily and brother-in-law of the emperor, following the battle of Dranginai caused a rift between him and Maniakes. This led Stephen to send a message to the emperor's brother, John the Orphanotrophos, which claimed that Maniakes was planning an insurrection against the emperor. Additionally, the Normans and Lombards of Arduin became outraged over the neglect and contempt they received from Maniakes despite their valuable military services, which caused them to desert and return to Apulia, where they led a revolt against the Byzantines.

These crises in the Adriatic were compounded by military developments in the Balkans, where the government of Michael and John now faced an uprising by the Bulgarian dissident Petar Delyan. Suspecting that Maniakes could exploit this situation to launch his own usurpation attempt, the government recalled him from Sicily and replaced him with the eunuch Basil Pediadites. Additionally, the majority of the Byzantine units in Sicily had to be transferred to other frontiers shortly after Maniakes' departure, some against the Bulgarians and others (such as the Varangian Guards of Harald Sigurdsson) to fight the Norman and Lombard rebels in Italy. Ultimately, this left the Byzantine forces garrisoning the reconquered territories heavily depleted when the Zirids conducted another counterattack in 1041. In a matter of months, Zirid forces were able to overwhelm the few Byzantine garrisons remaining in Sicily and retake most of the territory gained by Maniakes over nearly two years of fighting. Although this Zirid advance was temporarily checked by the victory won at Messina in 1041 by the garrison commander Katakalon Kekaumenos, the Byzantines were unable to spare forces to reverse the situation. Ultimately, by 1043 the remaining Byzantine forces had withdrawn from Sicily and the island was restored to Zirid control. While the Byzantines never conducted a further expedition to recover Sicily, they had inflicted extensive military and political damage that accelerated the disintegration of centralised Kalbid rule in Sicily, and in the coming decades Sicily became divided between competing Taifas, over which Palermo exerted limited control. To compound this situation, the successes achieved under Maniakes' leadership inspired the Normans to launch an invasion of their own in 1063. The Normans went on to lead a gradual conquest of the island which eventually ended Muslim Sicily in 1091.

== Bibliography ==
- Biały, Kamil (2016). "From Conquest to the Failed Usurpation: Career of a Typical Byzantine Commander George Maniakes". Proslogion: Studies in Medieval and Early Modern Social History and Culture. Vol. 14. pp. 171–185.
- Hollway, Don (2021). The Last Viking. Bloomsbury. p. 157. ISBN 9781472846518.
- Kaldellis, Anthony (2017). Streams of Gold, Rivers of Blood: The Rise and Fall of Byzantium, 955 A.D. to the First Crusade. Oxford University Press. ISBN 978-0190253226.
- Malaterra, Geoffrey (2005). The Deeds of Count Roger of Calabria & Sicily & of Duke Robert Guiscard his brother, Geoffrey Malaterra. Translated by Loud, Graham A. p. 3. Archived from the original on 3 March 2020.
- Metcalfe, Alex (2009). The Muslims of Medieval Italy (illustrated ed.). Edinburgh University Press. p. 142. ISBN 978-0-7486-2008-1.
- Shepard, Jonathan (1979). "Byzantium's Last Sicilian Expedition: Scylitzes' Testimony". Rivista di Studi Bizantini e Neoellenici. Nuova Serie. 14–16 (XXIV–XXVI). Istituto di Studi Bizantini e Neoellenici, Università di Roma: 145–159.
- Sturluson, Snorri (2005). "King Harald's Saga.". Penguin Classics.
- Theotokis, Georgios; Mesko, Marek (2020). War in Eleventh-Century Byzantium. Taylor & Francis. ISBN 9780429576881.
- Treadgold, Warren (1997). A History of the Byzantine State and Society. Stanford, California: Stanford University Press. ISBN 978-0804779371.
