= Hugh Tubœuf =

11th-century Norman explorer

Hugh Tubœuf or Tudebusis (French: Hugues Tubœuf, Italian: Ugo Tutabovi) was a Norman adventurer who went to Southern Italy around 1030 in search of glory and riches.

Hugh took part in the Sicilian expedition of George Maniaches in 1038. He was one of the twelve leaders of the mercenaries of Guaimar IV of Salerno who elected William Iron Arm as count at Melfi in September 1042 and received a twelfth of the conquered territory: the barony of Monopoli.

Tubœuf is famous for an event which took place on the eve of the Battle of Venosa in 1043. The Normans were outnumbered by the Byzantine army by about three to one. After receiving the envoys of the Byzantine catepan of Italy, Argyrus, himself a Lombard turncoat who had abandoned the cause of the Lombards and their Norman troops, who offered a peaceful settlement, Hugh began patting the horse of the chief ambassador on the neck and then, forming a fist, struck the horse with such force he killed it. The envoys returned with the story depicting the terrible physical strength of their adversaries. The battle went to the Normans.

The date of Hugh's death is unknown.
