= Battle of the Stragna River =

Battle of the Stragna
- Part of Byzantine-Seljuk wars
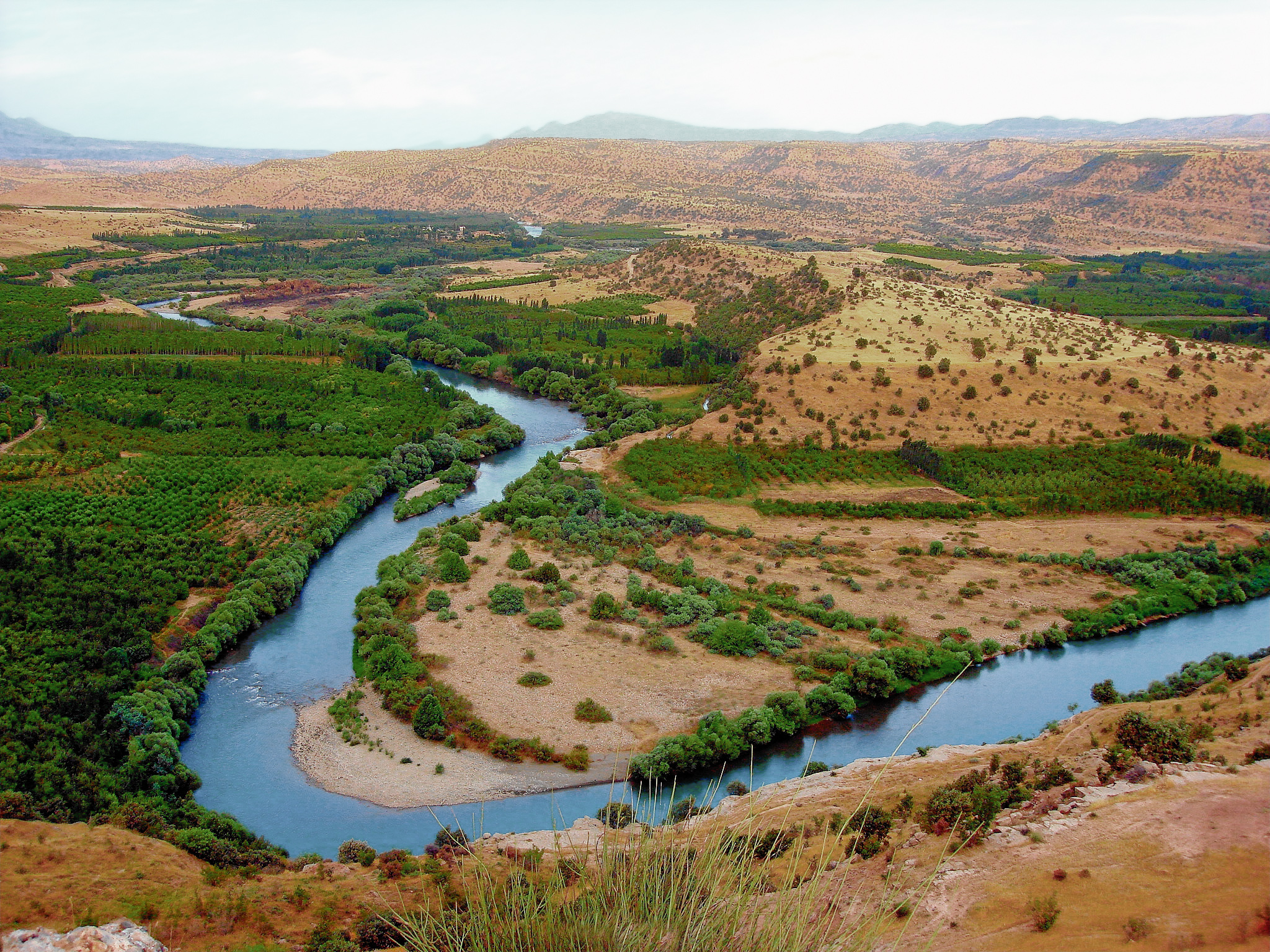
- Map depicting the Great Zab (Stragna) River and the approximate location of the battle.
Date	Spring 1048
Location	Stragna River (Great Zab), Vaspurakan and Lake Van 35.416°N 44.157°E
Result	Byzantine victory

Belligerents
Byzantine Empire	Seljuk Empire

Commanders and leaders
Katakalon Kekaumenos; Aaron	Hasan the Deaf †

Strength
Fewer than the Seljuks	20,000

Casualties and losses
Unknown	Most of the army

The Battle of the Stragna River or the Battle of Great Zab, was fought in 1048 between the forces of the Byzantine Empire and the Seljuk Empire near the Stragna River on the eastern Byzantine frontier. The Byzantine army, commanded by Katakalon Kekaumenos and Aaron, confronted a large Seljuk raiding force led by Hasan ibn Musa, known as "the Deaf". The battle formed part of the Seljuk incursions into Byzantine Armenia and preceded the larger Battle of Kapetron later that year. Through the use of a stratagem, the Byzantines were able to defeat the Seljuk army and recapture the loot taken during their raid.

== Background ==
By the 1040s, the political landscape of the Middle East had undergone a significant transformation with the emergence of the Seljuks as a dominant regional power, their victory at Dandanaqan in 1040 enabled the consolidation of Seljuk authority in Khurasan and facilitated its subsequent expansion across the Iranian plateau and the South Caucasus. The territorial expansion under Tughril I brought the Seljuks into direct contact with the Byzantine province of Vaspurakan. By 1045 or 1046, Qutalmish, the cousin of the sultan, entered Vaspurakan and encountered the Byzantine forces commanded by Stephen Leichoudes, where the Byzantine army was defeated and Stephen was captured, allowing the Seljuks to proceed their advance through the province.

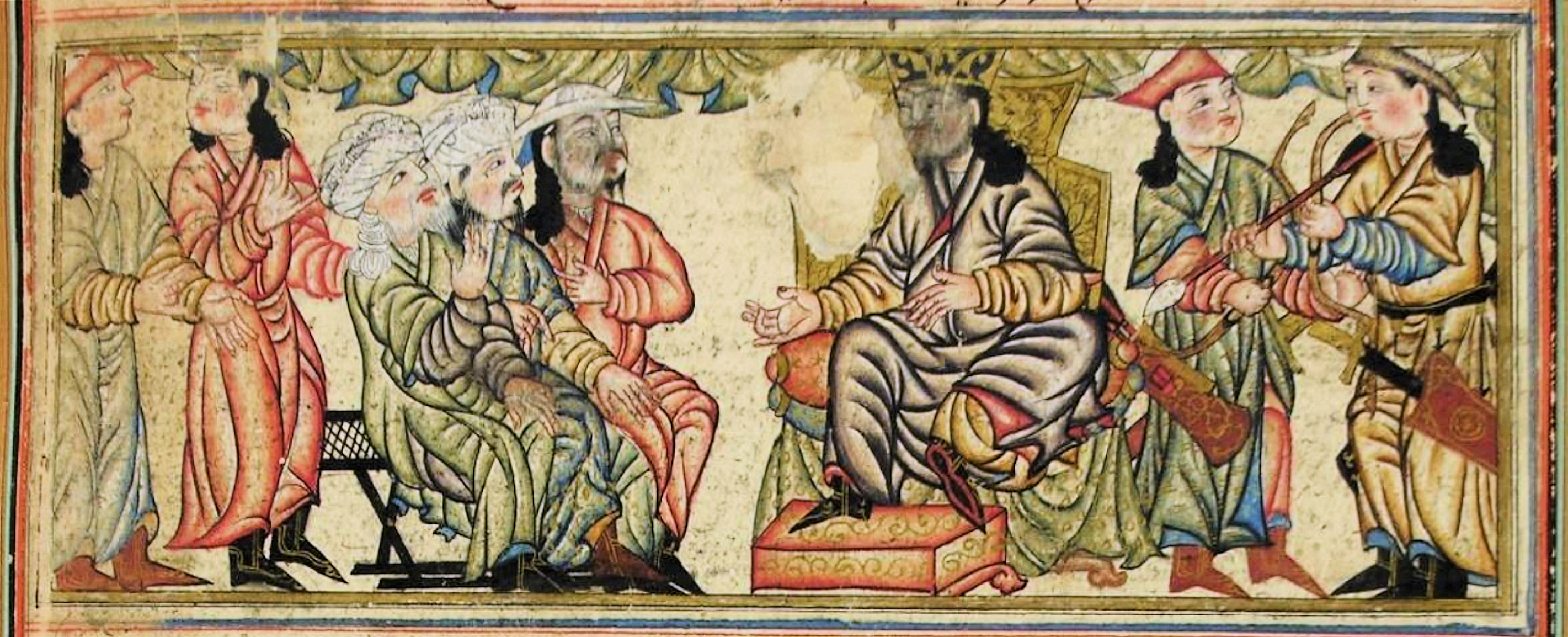
Miniature depicting Tughril I sitting on his throne

Following Qutalmish’s earlier incursion into Vaspurakan, a subsequent expedition was then led by Hasan ibn Musa, known in Byzantine sources as “Hasan the Deaf” or “Asan”, a nephew of Tughril. Hasan departed from Tabriz and advanced westward, raiding as far as Georgia, before turning back towards the Byzantine frontier with substantial booty. During his withdrawal, Hasan’s forces, reported by the Byzantine historian John Skylitzes to have numbered approximately 20,000 men, passed through Vaspurakan east of Lake Van. Their movement through the region prompted the katepano of Vaspurakan, Aaron, to seek the assistance of Katakalon Kekaumenos, the doux of Ani and Iberia, after which the two Byzantine commanders combined their forces and set out to intercept the Seljuks near the Stragna River (identified with the Great Zab) before they could return to Tabriz.

The Seljuk Empire during the reign of Tughril I

== Battle of Stragna ==
Eventually, the assembled Byzantine forces closed the distance with the Seljuks, and both armies encamped near the river Stragna with the intention of fighting the following day. The Byzantine leadership debated over which strategy would be used against the larger Seljuk army that approached, considering immediate night attacks and a conventional pitched battle being the following day. However, Kekaumenos ultimately settled on the use of a stratagem; Kekaumenos moved his men from their encampment and posted them in concealed positions in the terrain surrounding the camp, while the supplies, tents and baggage animals were intentionally left behind in order to induce the Turks to plunder. (Note: This stratagem is similar to one described in the 10th century De velitatione bellica.) At dawn, Hasan's army advanced from their camp and towards that of the Byzantines. When Seljuk troops marched forth to reconnoitre the camp, they found it devoid of men, but loaded with loot. Believing the Byzantine soldiers had fled, Hasan's troops broke into the camp to plunder it, dispersing in search of riches.

In their haste to gather plunder, the Seljuks became scattered throughout the camp with the result that, by the evening, they had lost cohesion as a fighting force. Once he had perceived this, Kekaumenos ordered his men to advance from their positions and retake their encampment by storm. The Seljuks were unable to resist the onrush of well-organised Byzantine soldiers and most of their army was killed in the ensuing combat, including Hasan the Deaf. The Byzantines retook all of the loot and captives taken by the Hasan's raiding army, while the few Seljuk survivors were forced to flee through mountainous terrain back towards the South Caucasus.

== Aftermath ==
The surviving Seljuk troops brought news of the disaster and death of Hasan to Sultan Tughril, who lamented the loss of his nephew and resolved to avenge the defeat. Consequently, Tughril organised a larger expedition under Ibrahim Inal, the half-brother of Tughril. Ibrahim advanced into Byzantine Armenia later in 1048, devastating the surrounding countryside and attacked the important trading centre of Artze. The Byzantine commanders Aaron and Kekaumenos subsequently withdrew towards Theodosiopolis while awaiting the arrival of their Georgian ally Liparit IV, eventually confronting the Seljuk army at Kapetron in September 1048.

== Bibliography ==
- Theotokis, Georgios; Mesko, Marek (2020). War in Eleventh-Century Byzantium. Taylor & Francis. ISBN 9780429576881.
- Kaldellis, Anthony (2017). Streams of Gold, Rivers of Blood: The Rise and Fall of Byzantium, 955 A.D. to the First Crusade. Oxford University Press. ISBN 978-0190253226.
- Wortley, John, ed. (2010). John Skylitzes: A Synopsis of Byzantine History, 811–1057. Cambridge: Cambridge University Press. ISBN 978-0-521-76705-7.
- Gilmer, James (2012). Lazarus Rising: Nikephoros Phokas and the Tenth Century Byzantine Military Rennaissance. Charles Town, West Virginia.
- Beihammer, Alexander Daniel (2017). Byzantium and the Emergence of Muslim-Turkish Anatolia, ca. 1040–1130. New York: Routledge. ISBN 978-1-351-98386-0.
