= Katakalon Kekaumenos =

Byzantine general (11th century)

Archon of the Danubian cities
- In office 1043–1045
- Monarch: Constantine IX Monomachos

Doux of Iberia
- In office 1045–1047
- Monarch: Constantine IX Monomachos
- Succeeded by: Leo Tornikios

Stratelates of the East
- In office late 1040s – 1055
- Monarch: Constantine IX Monomachos

Doux of Antioch
- In office 1055–1056
- Monarchs: Theodora Porphyrogenita; Michael VI Bringas
- Preceded by: Romanos Skleros
- Succeeded by: Michael Ouranos

Military service
- Allegiance: Byzantine Empire
- Years of service: fl. 1038–1057
- Rank: Protospatharios (1041); Vestes (1043); Magistros (1055); Kouropalates (1057)
- Battles/wars: Arab-Byzantine wars; Battle of Messina; Battle of Rometta; Reconquest of Syracuse; Siege of Messina; Rus'–Byzantine wars; Rus' attack on Constantinople; Byzantine-Seljuk wars; Battle of the Stragna River; Battle of Kapetron; Pecheneg Revolt

Katakalon Kekaumenos (Greek: Κατακαλὼν Κεκαυμένος) was a prominent Byzantine general of the middle 11th century.

== Biography ==
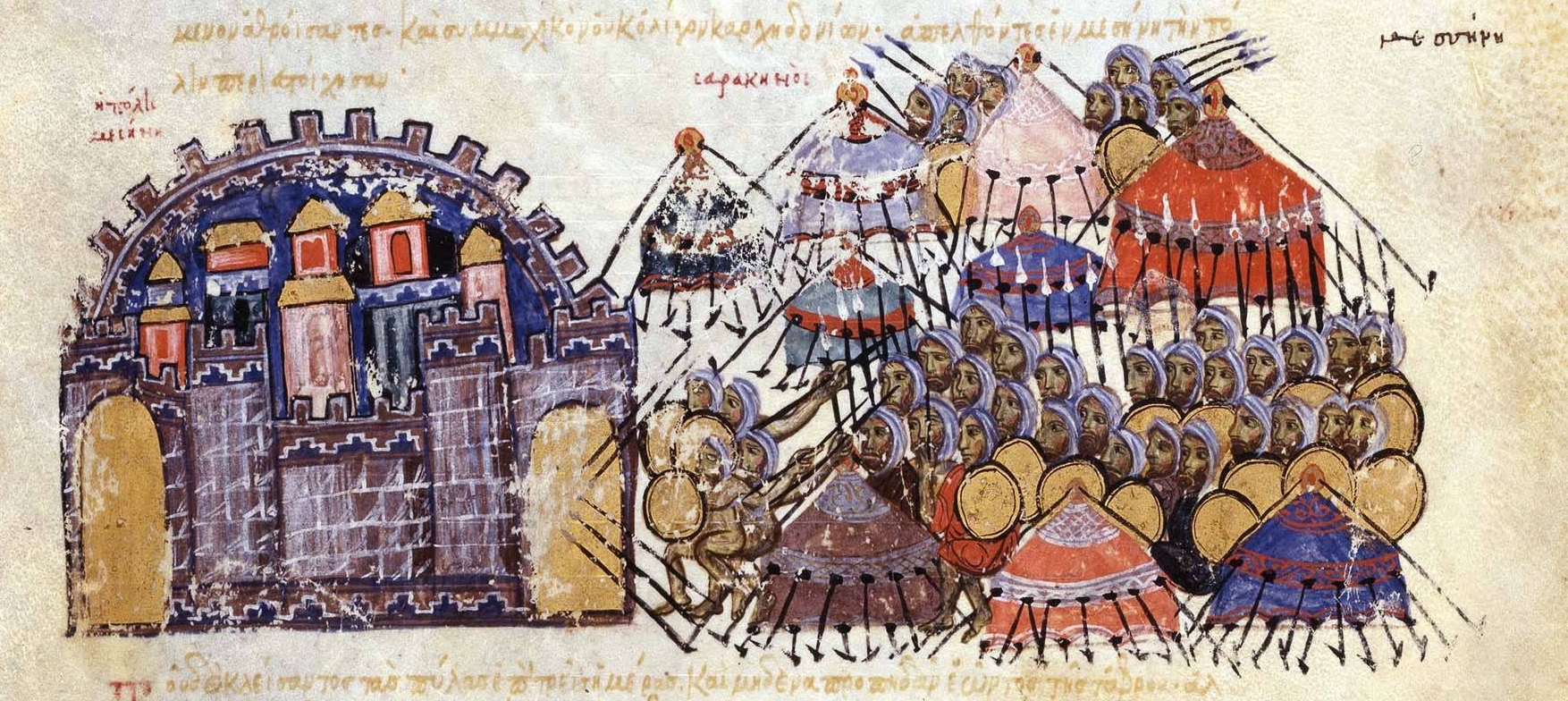
Depiction of the 1041 siege of Messina, defended by Kekaumenos, from the Madrid Skylitzes

Katakalon Kekaumenos was born in Koloneia, and although apparently a member of the noble Katakalon family, according to John Skylitzes he was not of aristocratic origin. He first distinguished himself in the Sicilian campaign of George Maniakes in the battles fought at Messina, Rometta, and Syracuse. There, Kekaumenos, with the rank of protospatharios, commanded a contingent from the Armeniac Theme and led the successful defence of Messina against an Arab attack in 1041.

In 1042, Emperor Michael V (r. 1041–1042) charged him with quelling an uprising in Constantinople. In the next year, he defeated the Rus' raid against the imperial capital, and was named vestes and archon of the Danubian cities. Under Emperor Constantine IX Monomachos (r. 1042–1055) he had a highly successful career. He served in the East as doux of Iberia, and became governor of Ani after it was annexed by the Byzantine Empire in 1045, and led the local forces in the first clashes with the Seljuk Turks. In the late 1040s, he had been promoted to the post of stratelates of the East. In 1049 he participated in the campaign against the Pechenegs, who had revolted against the emperor, as second-in-command to the militarily inexperienced rhaiktor Nikephoros. During this campaign, he was seriously injured. In circa 1055, he was raised to magistros and appointed to the prestigious and powerful post of doux of Antioch.

Emperor Constantine IX's successor, Michael VI (r. 1056–1057), generally mistrusted the prominent generals and treated them badly; he refused Katakalon and Isaac Komnenos, both of them already ranked as magistroi, promotion to the title of proedros, and eventually dismissed Kekaumenos. In turn, Kekaumenos actively supported the uprising of Isaac Komnenos in 1057, and was rewarded with the title of kouropalates.

== Portrayal in the sources and literary activity ==
Kekaumenos apparently wrote an autobiography, which was then used as his primary source for the events of 1042–1057 by John Skylitzes in his own history. Hence, Skylitzes's narrative describes his career in great detail and is highly laudatory of the general and his achievements. Katakalon Kekaumenos has also been put forward as the author of the so-called Strategikon of Kekaumenos, but his identification with its author, known only as Kekaumenos, is rejected by most modern scholars. He is also portrayed in the Turkish drama series "Alparslan: Büyük Selçuklu".

== Bibliography ==
- Guilland, Rodolphe (1967). Recherches sur les Institutions Byzantines, Tomes I–II (in French). Berlin: Akademie-Verlag.
- Holmes, Catherine (2005). Basil II and the Governance of Empire (976–1025). Oxford: Oxford University Press. ISBN 978-0-19-927968-5.
- Kazhdan, Alexander, ed. (1991). The Oxford Dictionary of Byzantium. Oxford and New York: Oxford University Press. ISBN 0-19-504652-8.
