= Battle of Rometta (1038) =

- Part of the Arab–Byzantine wars
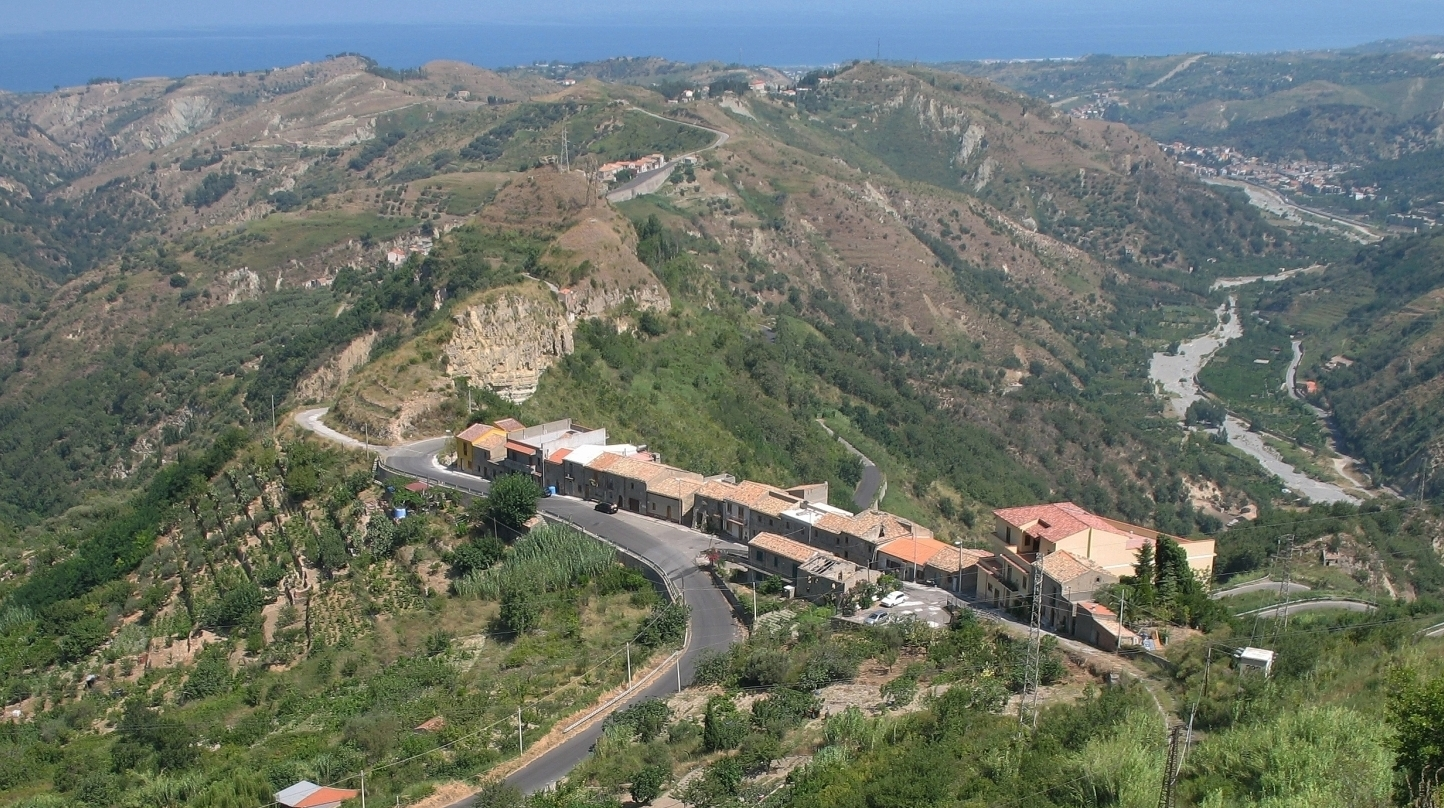
- Modern view of the valleys below the town of Rometta
Date	1038
Location	Rometta, Sicily
Result	Byzantine victory
Territorial changes	Byzantines capture Rometta

Belligerents
Byzantine Empire	Zirid Dynasty

Commanders and leaders
George Maniakes; Katakalon Kekaumenos; Harald Sigurdsson; Basil Pediadites	Abdullah ibn-Muizz

Strength
Total: 10,000–15,000; 1,000 Varangians; 2,000 Italian recruits and auxiliaries; 300–500 Normans	Total: 50,000 (according to John Skylitzes)

Casualties and losses
Unknown	Very Heavy

The Battle of Rometta was a major engagement fought during the Sicilian campaign of George Maniakes. The Byzantine expeditionary forces engaged and defeated a combined Kalbid-Zirid army near the town of Rometta. This success enabled Maniakes to extend Byzantine presence on Sicily with a series of subsequent offensives.

== Background ==
By the end of summer 1038, Maniakes' expedition to Sicily had gained an initial success with the capture of Messina, providing the Byzantines with a foothold on the island. The general established the city as a headquarters, from where he could conduct further operations into the island. One of his initial objectives was the capture of Rometta, the acquisition of which would be important in securing the western flank of the Byzantines from enemy counterattacks, if Maniakes was to advance southwards towards the ultimate objective in Eastern Sicily, the city of Syracuse. After securing his lines of communication, fortifying the town of Messina and possibly enrolling local Christian Sicilians into his army, which may have brought the strength of his forces up to 15,000, Maniakes began his advance towards Rometta. (Note: Georgios Theotokis notes that the fortification of recaptured towns was a core facet of Maniakes' strategy in Sicily. However, he casts doubt on the notion that the Byzantines enrolled large quantities of Christian Sicilian men into their expedition, as training these locals into an adequate fighting force would require time and resources, while the loyalty of such troops, who had hitherto lived under Muslim rule, would be suspect when fighting the Kalbids and Zirids. The detachment of men to garrison Messina would have depleted the strength of Maniakes' army at the time it engaged the Kalbids and Zirids near Rometta.)

== Battle of Rometta ==
After marching some 11 kilometres westwards across the Peloritan Mountains, Maniakes arrived outside fortified town of Rometta. There, a large Muslim army, consisting mostly of Zirid warriors from Ifriqiya, had gathered near the settlement to oppose the Byzantines. According to John Skylitzes, the Kalbid-Zirid army numbered 50,000 troops, though such a figure is likely inflated. The two armies fought a battle in the mountainous terrain surrounding Messina, in which the Byzantines were eventually victorious. According to Skylitzes, Maniakes' men cut down so many of their opponents in the battle and pursuit, that a nearby river was turned red with the flow of Arab blood into its waters.

The victory at Rometta was significant enough to facilitate the gradual extension of Byzantine control over Eastern Sicily. Rometta was likely the first of 13 settlements captured by George Maniakes during his subsequent offensives in this region of the island over the following year. The success of the expedition reached its apogee with the capture of Syracuse by the Byzantine army in 1040. It would also be in that year that the Zirids amassed an army large enough to challenge the Byzantines in the open again, fighting another battle against Maniakes at Dranginai.

== Bibliography ==
- Thurn, Hans, ed. (1973). Ioannis Scylitzae Synopsis historiarum. Berlin-New York: De Gruyter. ISBN 9783110022858.
- Hollway, Don (2021). The Last Viking. Bloomsbury. p. 157. ISBN 9781472846518.
- Kaldellis, Anthony (2017). Streams of Gold, Rivers of Blood: The Rise and Fall of Byzantium, 955 A.D. to the First Crusade. Oxford University Press. ISBN 978-0190253226.
- Biały, Kamil (2016). "From Conquest to the Failed Usurpation: Career of a Typical Byzantine Commander George Maniakes". Proslogion: Studies in Medieval and Early Modern Social History and Culture. Vol. 14. pp. 171–185.
- Theotokis, Georgios; Mesko, Marek (2020). War in Eleventh-Century Byzantium. Taylor & Francis. ISBN 9780429576881.
