= Richard of Hauteville =

Richard of Hauteville (c. 1045–1110) was a noble knight of Hauteville family, the conquerors of South Italy during the 11th century.

== Biography ==
Richard was born around 1045 to Drogo of Hauteville, a Norman adventurer and count, and Altrude of Salerno, a Lombard princess. He was a nephew of Robert Guiscard and Roger I of Sicily. On his father's death in 1051, he was too young to succeed, and his uncle Humphrey was elected count instead. On Humphrey's death, his cousins, Abelard and Herman were overlooked by their uncle Robert. While Abelard rebelled, claiming the inheritance, Richard allied with Robert and Roger. Richard was present with Guiscard at the fall of Bari in April 1071 and fought strongly against his rebel cousins and their allies between 1078 and 1080, when Abelard died. For his support, Richard was confirmed as count of Castellaneta, Oria, and Mottola by his uncle.

In 1101, Richard was appointed seneschal of Apulia and Calabria by the Guiscard's son and successor, his cousin, Roger Borsa.

== Sources ==
- Ghisalberti, Albert (ed). Dizionario Biografico degli Italiani: II Albicante – Ammannati. Rome, 1960.
- Gwatkin, H. M., Whitney, J. P. (ed.) et al. The Cambridge Medieval History: Volume III. Cambridge University Press, 1926.
- Norwich, John Julius. The Normans in the South 1016-1130. London: Longmans, 1967.
- Chalandon, Ferdinand. Histoire de la domination normande en Italie et en Sicilie. Paris, 1907.
- Gravett, Christopher, and Nicolle, David. The Normans: Warrior Knights and their Castles. Oxford: Osprey Publishing, 2006.
- Beech, George. A Norman-Italian Adventurer in the East: Richard of Salerno. 1993.
