= Battle of Dranginai (1040) =

Zirid loss in Sicily to the Byzantines

- Part of the Arab–Byzantine wars
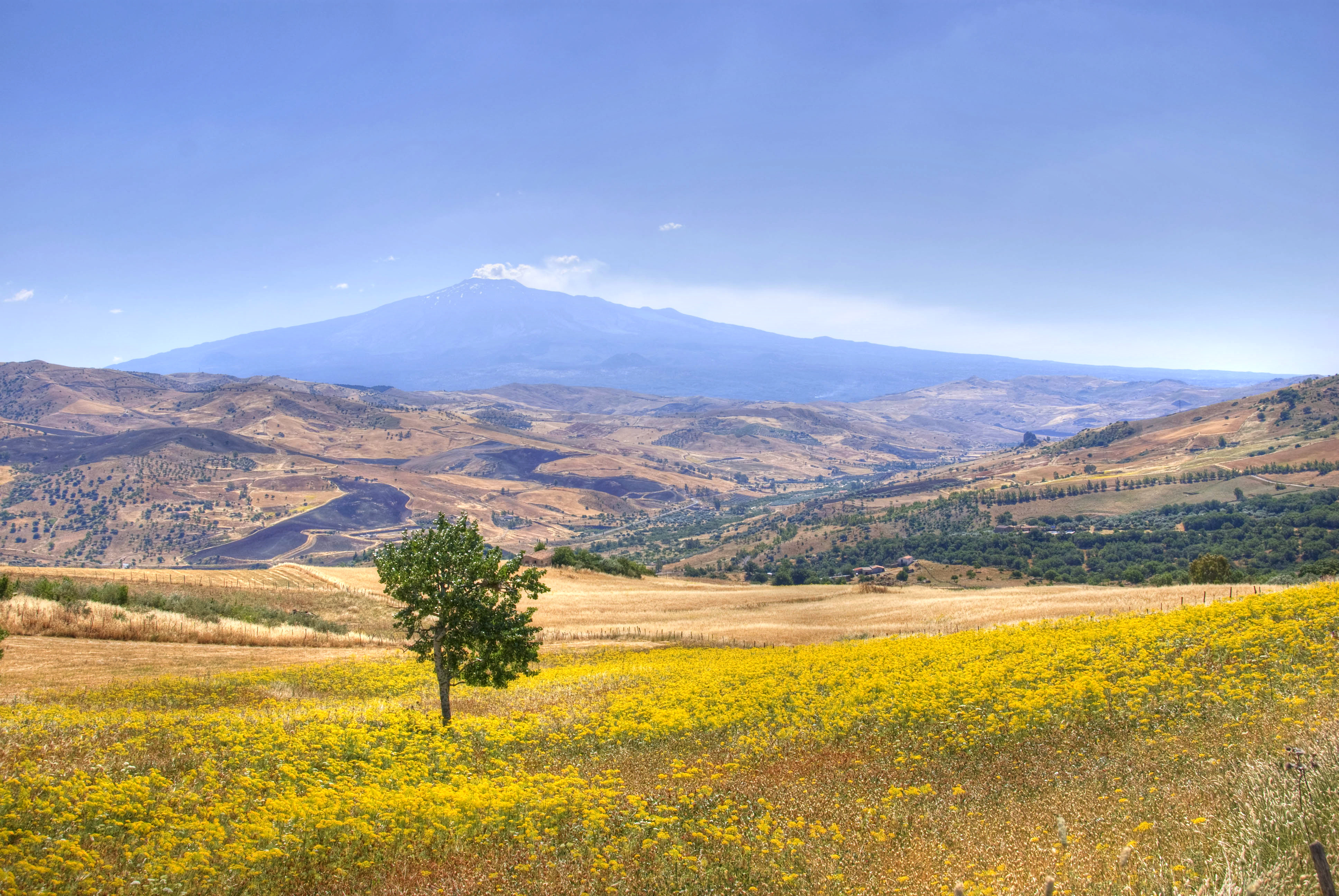
- Countryside near Troina (Medieval Dranginai) with Mount Etna in the background
Date	Summer 1040
Location	Dranginai (modern Troina), Sicily
Result	Byzantine victory

Belligerents
Byzantine Empire	Zirid Dynasty

Commanders and leaders
George Maniakes; Harald Sigurdsson; Arduin the Lombard; Rainulf Drengot; Drogo of Hauteville; William Iron Arm; Úlfr Óspaksson; Halldor Snorrason	Abdullah ibn-Muizz

Strength
Large army; 1,000 Varangian Guards; 300–500 Normans	60,000 (according to Goffredo Malaterra)

Casualties and losses
Unknown	50,000 (according to John Skylitzes)

The Battle of Dranginai was fought between the forces of the Byzantine Empire and the Zirids during the Sicilian expedition of George Maniakes. The Byzantine army, including the Varangian Guard and Norman mercenaries, successfully attacked and defeated a large Zirid army under the Emir Abdullah ibn-Muizz near Dranginai. However, a series of internal and political disputes struck the Byzantines soon after the victory, and ultimately the battle was the final major operation fought by Maniakes in Sicily prior to his recall.

== Background ==
In 1040, the Byzantine expedition to Sicily led by Maniakes had succeeded in its primary objective in Eastern Sicily with the reconquest of Syracuse from the Arabs. However, in the face of territorial losses to the Byzantines, the Zirids resolved to conduct a new counteroffensive against Maniakes, after having been defeated near Rometta over a year before. From his operating base at Palermo, Abdullah ibn-Muizz, having recovered from the previous defeats, amassed a larger army than before. This force included reinforcements from Ifriqiya, which Goffredo Malaterra claimed to have numbered 60,000 men (though modern historians are sceptical of this large figure). After collecting his army, Abdullah initiated his offensive, marching southeastwards into the Nebrodi Mountains, until he arrived in the vicinity of the town of Dranginai. When Maniakes received news of the Zirid movements, he prepared his own army and marched west to confront the emir. Confident of success, Maniakes ordered Stephen, the admiral of the expeditionary fleet and brother-in-law of Emperor Michael IV, to sail to the west and cut off the Zirid route of retreat to Africa.

== Battle ==
By the time of Maniakes' arrival, Abdullah had encamped his army at Cerami in Val Demone, which lay nearly 13 kilometres from Dranginai. Unwilling to attack uphill towards the Byzantine army, the Zirids began fortifying their position. According to the writings of Neilos Doxapatres, Abdullah anticipated the attack of the Byzantine cavalry by deploying a large number of caltrops to be scattered across the battlefield surrounding his position, intending to wound the enemy horses and break the momentum of the Byzantine cavalry. However, some of Maniakes' scouts spotted the caltrops, and in response Maniakes issued his cavalrymen with horseshoes to protect their mounts' feet from the sharp caltrops.

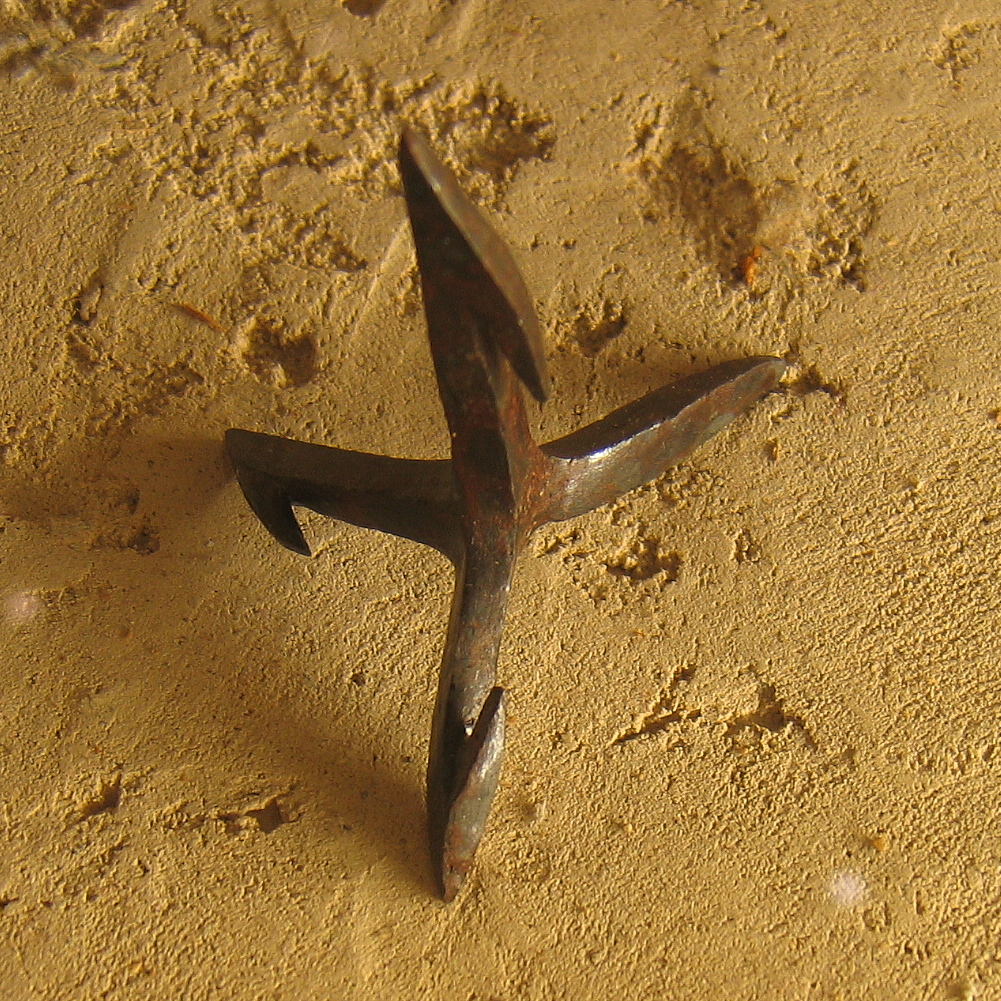
A Roman-era caltrop. Similar devices were used in the medieval period, including at the Battle of Dranginai

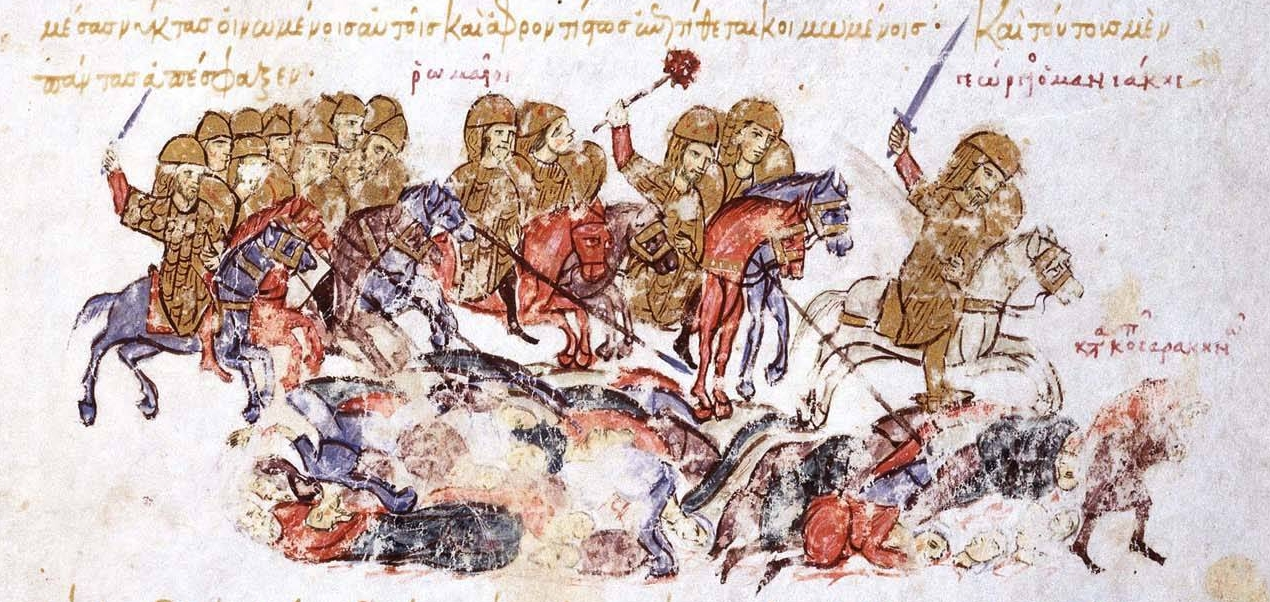
George Maniakes defeats an Arab army in battle, as depicted in John Skylitzes' illustrated text

Having adequately equipped his army for the battlefield, Maniakes advanced down from Troina and arrayed his army in a formation of three lines, with the Byzantine Cavalry and Norman knights on the wings. The infantry, spearheaded by Harald Sigurdsson's Varangian Guards, were placed in the centre. As the Byzantines advanced, the weather developed in their favour when, according to Doxapatres, a summer dust storm brewed and blew towards the Zirid lines, causing disarray within their ranks. Exploiting this, Maniakes sounded an attack by the heavy cavalry, and with the Zirid caltrops nullified by the Byzantines' horseshoes, this attack proved highly effective against the Zirid lines. After the Varangians and other infantry had pressed the attack, Abdullah's army routed. Some of the Byzantine cavalry, in particular their Norman contingent under William Iron Arm, pursued the retreating Arabs and cut down many of them, while the Byzantine infantry captured and plundered the Zirid camp. According to John Skylitzes, 50,000 warriors of the Zirid army were killed in the battle of Dranginai. Allegedly, a nearby river was renamed Saracena because many of the Arabs' corpses fell into it during their pursuit by the Byzantine cavalry.

== Aftermath ==
Following his victory, Maniakes ordered a construction of a monastery on the site of the battlefield dedicated to the Theotokos, in which was placed an icon of Saint Lucia, the patron saint of Syracuse. Eventually, the village of Maniace (named after George Maniakes) developed around this monastery. However, the battle of Dranginai proved to be the zenith of Byzantine success in their Sicilian expedition, and the final victory Maniakes achieved on the island. Despite the crushing victory on the battlefield, the surviving Zirid forces, including Abdullah ibn-Muizz, had reached the coast and managed to escape by sea back to Africa, eluding Stephen's fleet. Maniakes became enraged with Stephen for his failure to intercept the Zirids, and upon summoning the archon to his camp flogged him for his failure to capture Abdullah. Humiliated by this treatment, Stephen dispatched a letter to the emperor's brother, John the Orphanotrophos, which accused Maniakes of plotting a usurpation attempt and produced political tension between Maniakes and the imperial government.

Furthermore, the Norman contingent became outraged when the rest of the Byzantine army refused to hand over to them a portion of the spoils taken in the Zirid camp. They attempted to send Arduin the Lombard to negotiate the return of the loot, but this request incensed Maniakes, who considered the loot to be rightfully his own by the will of God and ordered Arduin to also be flogged for his perceived transgression. The Normans wanted to mutiny at this juncture, but Arduin restrained them temporarily to plot a more strategic revolt later. For the time being, Arduin behaved submissively to Maniakes, but later deserted the Byzantine army and crossed Messina to Southern Italy, ultimately reaching Apulia. There, the Normans and Lombards launched a revolt against the Byzantines.

== Bibliography ==
- Biały, Kamil (2016). "From Conquest to the Failed Usurpation: Career of a Typical Byzantine Commander George Maniakes". Proslogion: Studies in Medieval and Early Modern Social History and Culture. Vol. 14. pp. 171–185.
- Hollway, Don (2021). The Last Viking. Bloomsbury. p. 157. ISBN 9781472846518.
- Kaldellis, Anthony (2017). Streams of Gold, Rivers of Blood: The Rise and Fall of Byzantium, 955 A.D. to the First Crusade. Oxford University Press. ISBN 978-0190253226.
- Malaterra, Geoffrey (2005). The Deeds of Count Roger of Calabria & Sicily & of Duke Robert Guiscard his brother, Geoffrey Malaterra. Translated by Loud, Graham A. p. 3. Archived from the original on 3 March 2020.
- Metcalfe, Alex (2009). The Muslims of Medieval Italy (illustrated ed.). Edinburgh University Press. p. 142. ISBN 978-0-7486-2008-1.
- Thurn, Hans, ed. (1973). Ioannis Scylitzae Synopsis historiarum. Berlin-New York: De Gruyter. ISBN 9783110022858.
- Treadgold, Warren (1997). A History of the Byzantine State and Society. Stanford, California: Stanford University Press. ISBN 978-0804779371.
