= Castello Maniace =

Building in Syracuse, Italy

Coordinates: 37°03′13″N 15°17′43″E

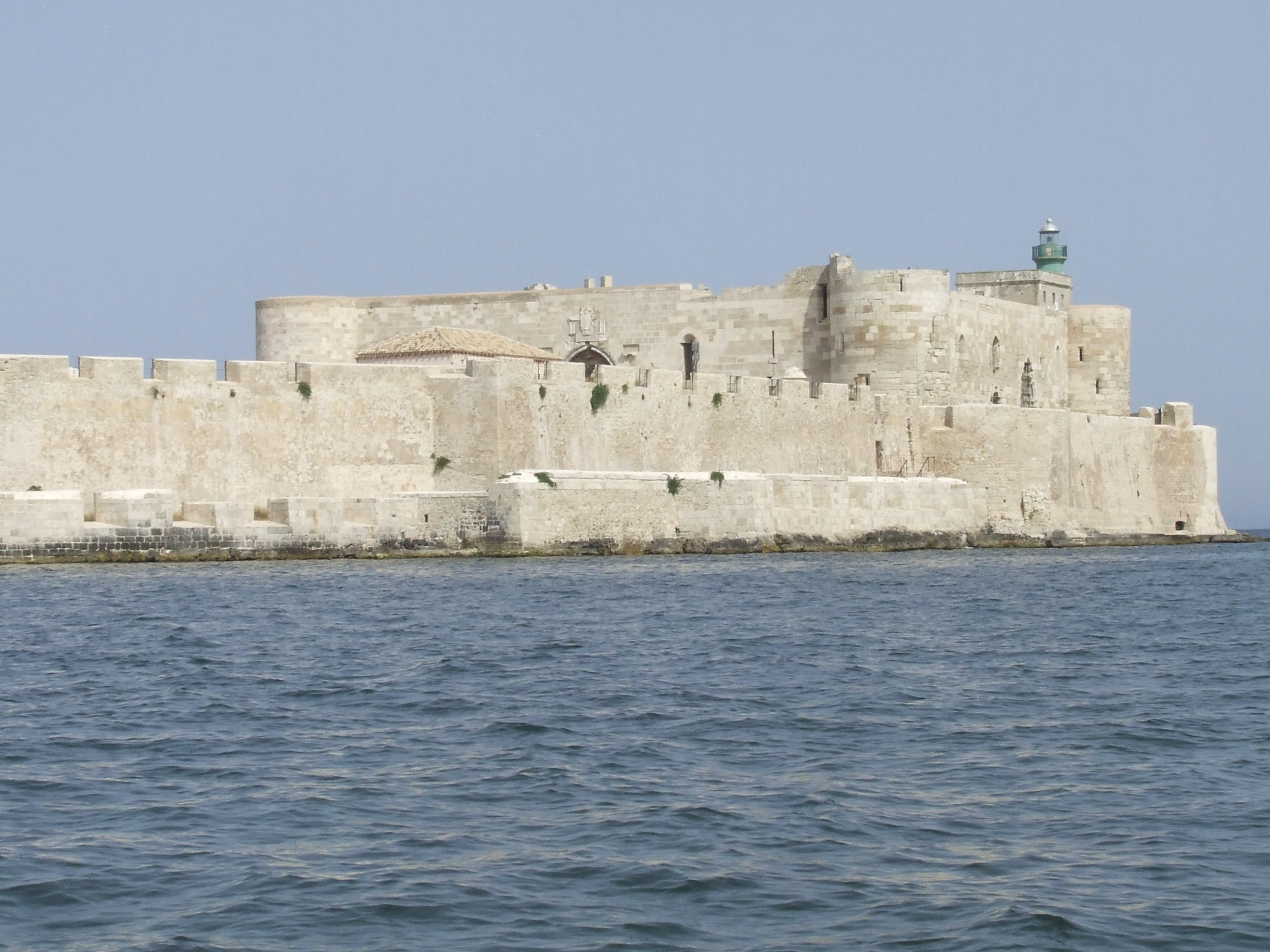
Castello Maniace viewed from the seaward side of the Marina Grande.

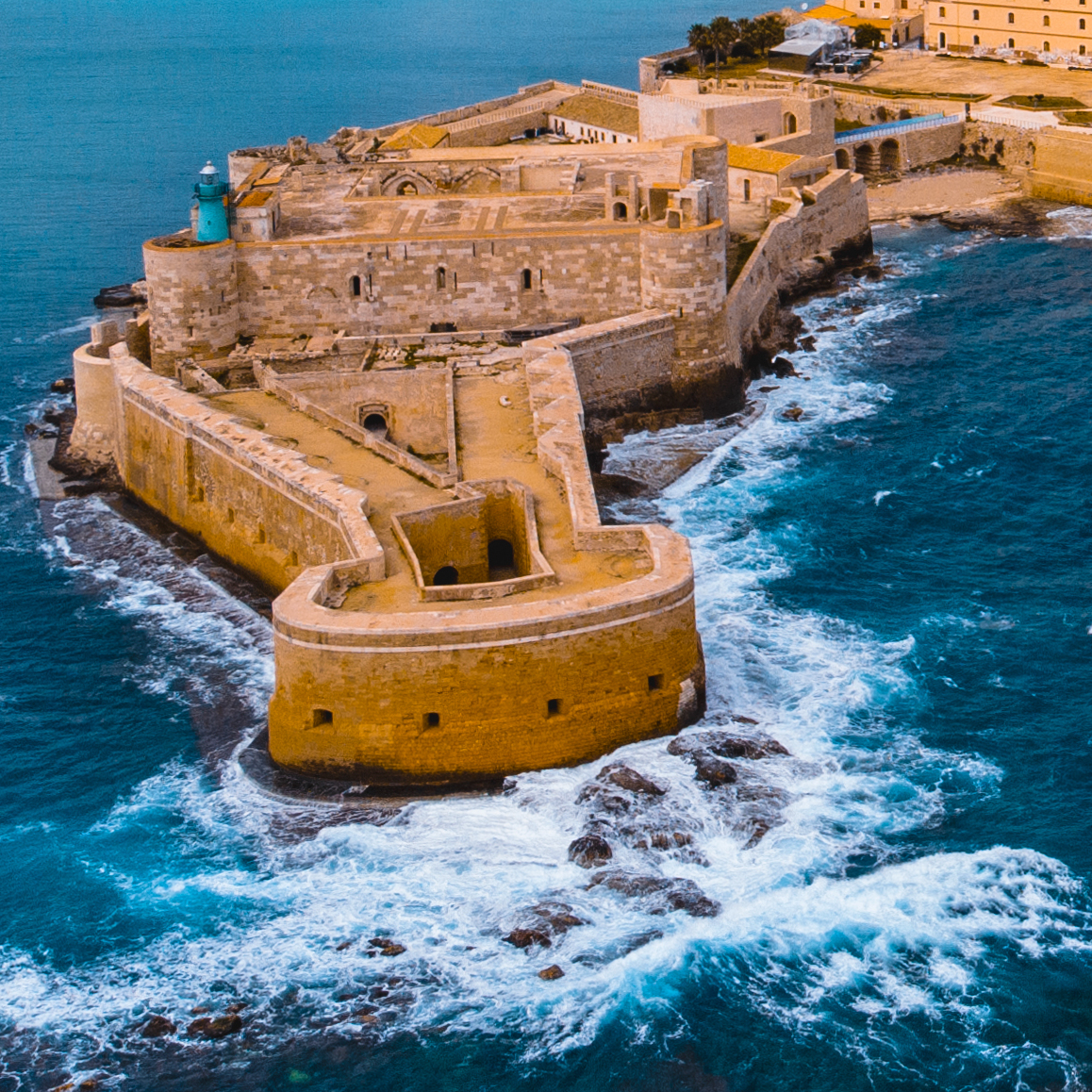
Aerial view of the castle.

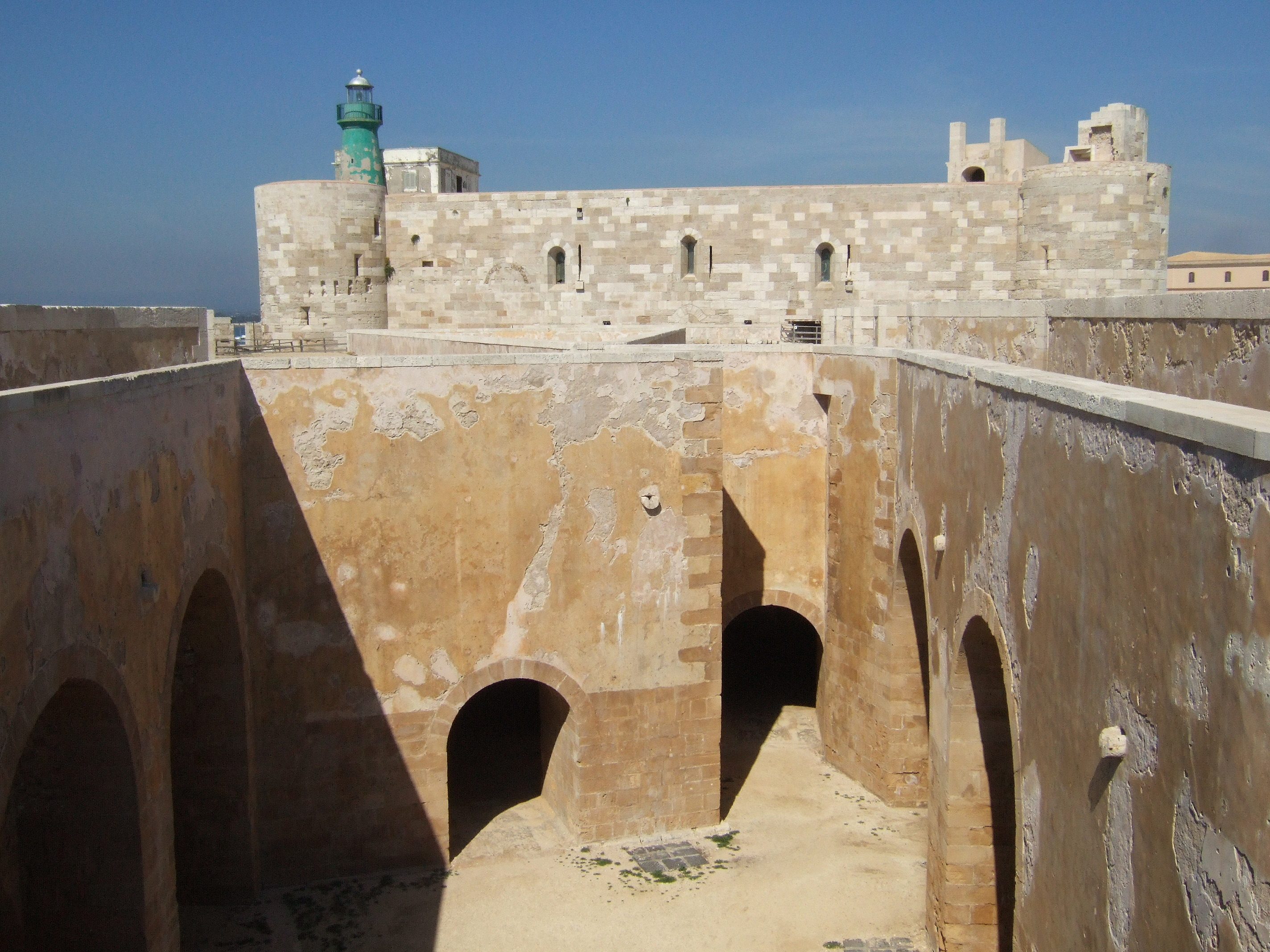
Internal view of the castle.

The Castello Maniace is a citadel and castle in Syracuse, Sicily, southern Italy. It is situated at the far point of the Ortygia island promontory, where it was constructed between 1232 and 1240 by the Emperor Frederick II. It bears the name of George Maniakes, the Byzantine general who besieged and took the city in 1038. Originally, one could only enter the castle over a bridge spanning a moat (now filled). A feature of the castle is the decorated portal. Today the castle is open to the public and is a local tourist attraction in Syracuse.

== History ==
The first fort was built here in 1038 by George Maniakes, a Greek general and later the Catepan of Italy, after he captured Syracuse from the Arabs on behalf of the Emperor Michael IV the Paphlagonian. Frederick II, as King of Sicily, had his architect Riccardo da Lentini build it in 1232–1240. King Peter III of Aragon resided here with his family in 1288.

During the War of the Sicilian Vespers, the fortress became a lynchpin in the Sicilian defense of the city. In 1298 the fortress withstood an assault by an Angevin–Aragonese fleet during the Angevin invasion of Sicily.

From 1305 to 1536 the castle was used as a residence by numerous queens of Sicily.

In the 15th century it was used as a prison. In the following century it was included in the fortification defending the harbour and the city. A huge explosion damaged it in 1704, after which it was renovated and adapted to the use of guns.

== Sources ==
- Alexander Knaak: Prolegomena zu einem Corpuswerk der Architektur Friedrichs II. von Hohenstaufen im Königreich Sizilien 1220–1250, Marburg 2001. ISBN 3-89445-278-1 (For Castello Maniace see pp. 47–58)
