= Battle of Vaspurakan =

- Part of the Byzantine–Seljuq wars
Date	1046
Location	Vaspurakan
Result	Seljuk victory

Belligerents
Seljuk Empire	Byzantine Empire

Commanders and leaders
Qutalmish	Stephanos (POW)

Casualties and losses
Unknown	Unknown

The Battle of Vaspurakan took place between Seljuk and Byzantine forces in 1046 during which the Turks raided Vaspurakan and then defeated and captured its governor.

The Seljuk ruler Tughril Bey sent Ibrahim Yinal and Qutalmish to Azerbaijan, they advanced towards the lands inhabited by the Armenians and Georgians. The son of Chaghri Bey, Yakuti, conquered al-Jebel, Daylem and parts of Azerbaijan. The Seljuk advance had therefore reached the Aras river. In 1046 the Seljuk Turks defeated the Byzantines in the Battle of Ganja. Following this battle the Seljuk Turks entered into another conflict with the Byzantines.

In 1046 Qutalmish initiated a conflict with the Byzantines, this was because the Seljuks were denied permission to cross Lake Van by the regent of Vaspurakan, Stephanos. As a result, a battle ensued and Qutalmish emerged victorious over the Byzantine regent. Stephanos was taken captive by the Seljuks and sold in a slave market in Tabriz.
