= Synodianos =

Synodianos was very briefly the catepan of Italy in 1042 (February – April). He was appointed by Michael V after the death of the Emperor Michael IV. He immediately demanded the surrender of all the formerly Greek cities of Apulia and began assembling an army to retake them when he was recalled in April 1042 by the Empress Zoe after the death of Michael V.

== Sources ==
- Chalandon, Ferdinand. Histoire de la domination normande en Italie et en Sicile. Paris, 1907.

Preceded by Exaugustus Boioannes	Catepan of Italy; Feb. 1042 – Apr. 1042	Succeeded by George Maniaces
