= Pardos (catepan) =

Pardos was the catepan of Italy briefly in 1042 following the short term of George Maniakes.

In July 1042, Maniakes was disgraced and recalled by Constantine IX Monomachos at the behest of Romanus Sclerus, brother of the emperor's mistress. According to Ioannes Skylitzes, Romanus had even raped Maniakes' wife. In September 1042, Pardo arrived with an army at Otranto to take over command from Maniakes. According to Lupus Protospatharius, he brought a chrysobull, but the meaning of this is uncertain. Pardos was accompanied by Nicholas, Archbishop of Bari, who, though under the jurisdiction of the Roman see, was apparently a Byzantine loyal, and by Tubaki, a protospatharius. It is probable that the archbishop had joined the catepan in a prior landing, during which the Greeks had negotiated with the Lombard rebel leader Argyrus. Subsequently, Argyrus abandoned the Lombard cause for the Greek. Pardos and Tubaki were arrested at Otranto, however, and executed by Maniakes, who was acclaimed emperor by his troops.

== Sources ==
- Chalandon, Ferdinand. Histoire de la domination normande en Italie et en Sicile. Paris, 1907.

Preceded by George Maniaces	Catepan of Italy; 1042	Succeeded by Basil Theodorocanus
