= Arduin the Lombard =

Lombard mercenary and rebel

- Military career
- Allegiance: Byzantine Empire (until 1040)
- Rank: Topoteretes
- Conflicts: Arab–Byzantine wars; Capture of Messina (1038); Campaign for Syracuse (1038-1040); Battle of Dranginai (1040)

Arduin the Lombard or Arduin of Melfi (Italian: Arduino di Melfi; Greek: Αρντουίνος του Μέλφι, romanized: Ardouinos ton Mélfi; fl. 1038–1042) was a Lombard nobleman and mercenary who fought under the Byzantine strategos George Maniakes in Sicily as the leader of a band of Norman and Lombard mercenaries, before rebelling against them in Apulia.

== Biography ==
According to Amatus of Montecassino, Arduin was a vassal of St Ambrose, Archbishop of Milan (Arduyn, servicial de saint Ambroise, archevesque de Melan).

He was the leader of the troops committed by Guaimar IV of Salerno to Maniakes' Sicilian expedition in 1038 and participated in the capture of Messina and in the reconquest of Syracuse. After the Battle of Troina however, Arduin and his Norman contingent became outraged due to disagreements on how to divide spoils taken from the defeated Zirids. This caused an enraged Maniakes to order Arduin to be stripped and flogged for his perceived transgression. Due to this humiliation, the Normans wanted to mutiny, but Arduin temporarily restrained them, and instead deserted the Byzantine camp and crossed from Messina to Southern Italy, ultimately reaching Apulia.

On the peninsula, the Byzantine Catepan of Italy Michael Dokeianos appointed him as topoteretes of Melfi, however still resentful, Arduin helped start a Lombard revolt. He travelled to Aversa and asked for help from his former Norman soldiers, including William Iron Arm, in exchange for control of Melfi. However, after the first two leaders of the revolt (Atenulf and Argyrus) defected to the Byzantines, the Lombard nobles rejected Arduin as the new leader, and instead William Iron Arm took control of the revolt.

== Sources ==
- Loud, Graham Anthony. The Age of Robert Guiscard: Southern Italy and the Norman Conquest. Harlow: Longman/Pearson Education, 2000.
- Norwich, John Julius (1967). The Normans in the South, 1016-1130. Longmans. ISBN 978-0-571-25964-9.
- Malaterra, Geoffrey (2005). The Deeds of Count Roger of Calabria & Sicily & of Duke Robert Guiscard his brother, Geoffrey Malaterra. Translated by Loud, Graham A. p. 3. Archived from the original on 3 March 2020.
- Treadgold, Warren (1997). A History of the Byzantine State and Society. Stanford, California: Stanford University Press. ISBN 978-0804779371.

== See also ==
- Norman conquest of southern Italy
