= William Iron Arm =

Norman adventurer, founder of the fortunes of the Hauteville family

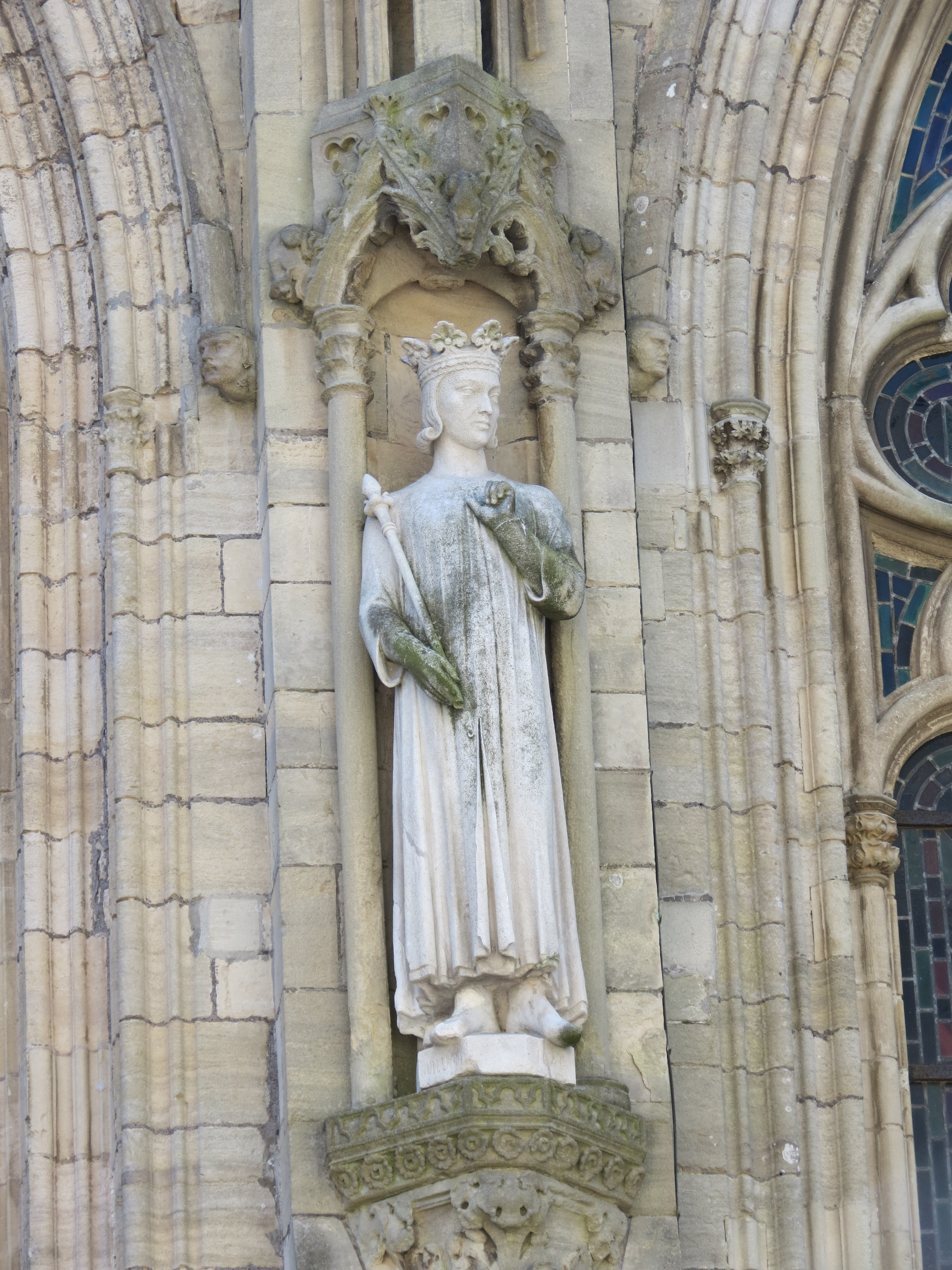
- Statue of William Iron Arm outside Coutances Cathedral

Count of Apulia
- Reign: 1042 - 1046
- Successor: Drogo
- Died: 1046
- Noble family: Hauteville
- Spouse: Guida of Sorrento
- Father: Tancred
- Mother: Muriella

Military service
- Battles/wars: Arab–Byzantine wars; Battle of Messina; Reconquest of Syracuse; Battle of Dranginai; Norman conquest of southern Italy; Battle of Montemaggiore; Battle of Montepeloso

William of Hauteville (died 1046), better known by his nickname, William Iron Arm, was a Norman military leader and the first Count of Apulia. He initiated the series of fortunes of the House of Hauteville.

== Life ==
William was a son of Tancred of Hauteville by his first wife Muriella. Goffredo Malaterra records him as being the eldest son, while Romuald Guarna records him as being the fourth, coming after Serlo, Geoffrey and Drogo. Regardless, it is unlikely that William was older than Serlo, as Serlo stayed in Normandy to inherit their father's possessions, while William journeyed to Southern Italy.

Since Tancred had many sons, and his possessions weren't enough to satisfy all of them, William and many of his brothers were soon forced to seek fortune elsewhere.

=== First years in Southern Italy ===
Around 1035/7, William journeyed to Southern Italy with his brothers Drogo and Humphrey, to strengthen the ranks of Rainulf Drengot, Count of Aversa, the first Norman mercenary lord who had been granted a fief. Together with Rainulf, the Hauteville brothers took part in a military operation led by Guaimar IV of Salerno against Pandulf IV, Prince of Capua.

With time, William and his brothers put themselves under the direct service of Guaimar IV. Guaimar sent them, together with other Norman and Lombard forces, to help in a Byzantine attempt to conquer Sicily, which was occupied by the Saracens. Between 1038 and 1040, William, together with his brothers, fought in Sicily, distinguishing himself in the battles fought at Messina and Troina. During the siege of Syracuse, led by the Byzantine general Georgios Maniakes, William charged and single-handedly killed the emir of the city, gaining himself his nickname, "Iron Arm".

After the siege of Syracuse, due to unpaid wages and an unfair division of loot, the Norman forces were dissatisfied with Maniakes. They sent forward their leader, Arduin, to give a voice to their reasons. Maniakes, however, humiliated Arduin, (Note: Amatus of Montecassino records that he was stripped naked and whipped for his presumption) and both the Normans and Lombards immediately left the Byzantine expedition (which was already weakened by internal discord) and returned to Guaimar IV.

In 1040 a Lombard rebellion in Apulia, led by the nobleman Argyrus, started. Arduin, being a Lombard himself, travelled to Aversa and asked for help from his former Norman soldiers, among whom there was obviously William. In exchange, he would have given them control of Melfi, and from there Normans and Lombards would have chased off the Byzantines and would have divided Apulia between themselves. The Norman forces were essential in obtaining two victories: one at Montemaggiore, on May 4, 1041, and the other at Montepeloso, on September 3 of the same year.

=== Count of Apulia ===
During the rebellion, due to corruption and distrust, the Lombard and Norman forces struggled to maintain a leader. Arduin was refused as a figurehead by the Apulian Lombards, and his successive successors, Atenulf of Benevento and then Argyrus, were both subjects of bribery by the Byzantines.

William, however, had managed to keep the Normans under his control, and was the key to many victories during the rebellion. Thus, in September 1042, he was nominated Count of all the Normans in Apulia, with the Norman capital in Melfi. His title and territories were recognized by Guaimar IV, who gave William the hand of his niece Guida (the daughter of Guy of Sorrento) in marriage, and also granted him Ascoli as a personal fief. In turn, William declared himself Guaimar's vassal, as Guaimar assumed the title of Duke of Apulia and Calabria.

From his county, William marched against Bari, which was still under Byzantine control. However, he failed to achieve any success there, and he thus shifted his attacks towards Lucania and Calabria, where in 1044 he built the castle of Scribla. He died shortly afterwards, between May and September 1046. He was succeeded by his brother Drogo.

== Notes ==
New creation	Count of Apulia and Calabria; 1042–1046	Succeeded by Drogo
