= Capture of Messina (1038) =

- Part of the Arab–Byzantine wars
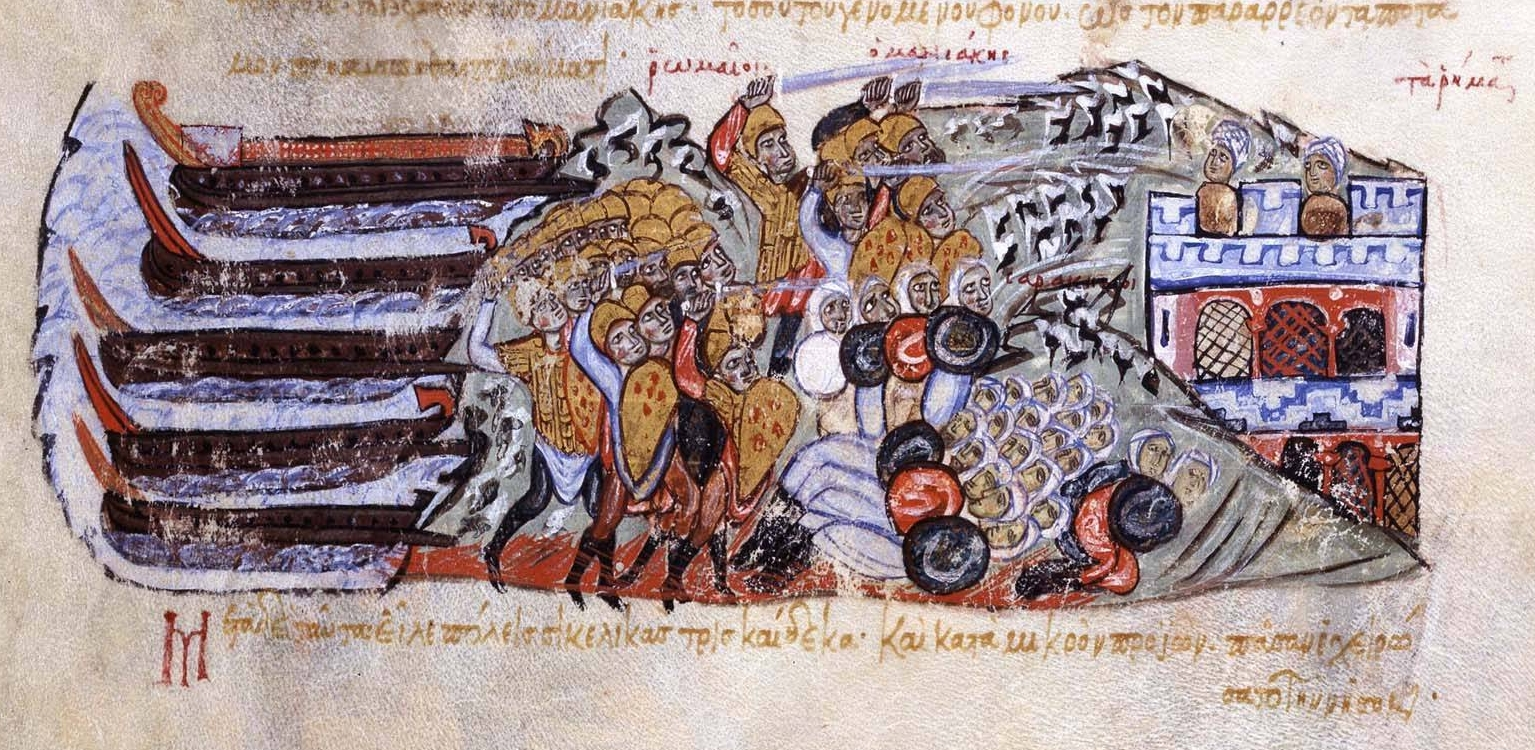
- Byzantine landing on Sicily in 1038, as depicted in John Skylitzes' illustrated text
Date	Spring or Summer 1038
Location	Messina, Sicily
Result	Byzantine victory
Territorial changes	Byzantines capture Messina

Belligerents
Byzantine Empire	Kalbid Emirate

Commanders and leaders
George Maniakes; Katakalon Kekaumenos; Harald Sigurdsson; Arduin the Lombard; Rainulf Drengot; Drogo of Hauteville; William Iron Arm; Stephen	Unknown

Strength
Total: 10,000; 1,000 Varangian Guards; 2,000 Italian recruits and auxiliaries; 300–500 Normans	Unknown

Casualties and losses
Unknown	Heavy

The Capture of Messina in 1038 was the first achievement made by the Byzantines during the Sicilian expedition of George Maniakes. The Byzantine army, including Varangian and Norman elements, conducted an opposed landing onto the Kalbid-held island near Messina. After a fierce engagement on the beach, the Kalbids were forced to retreat and cede a bridgehead to Maniakes' forces. The forces of the expedition was then able to march on the city of Messina, which surrendered to the Byzantines and became a base of operations for George Maniakes over the following years.

== Background ==
In the early 1030s, the forces of the Kalbid Emirate of Sicily and the Ifriqiyan Zirids had conducted a series of naval attacks against the Eastern Mediterranean coastlines of the Byzantine Empire. However, the political situation on Sicily had deteriorated for the Arabs when a civil war broke out between the emir Ahmad al-Akhal and his brother Abu Hafs, each of whom was backed by factions on the ethnic and economic bases that reflected the internal divisions in the society of Muslim Sicily. Ahmad entered negotiations with the Byzantines and in 1035 and was granted the title of Magistros, while dispatching his son to Constantinople. As this marked an implicit submission by a Muslim Sicilian leader to Byzantium, Ahmed's actions drew the ire of the Zirids, who dispatched an expedition to oust him from Sicily in 1036. The following year Opos, the Catepan of Italy, assembled regional Byzantine troops and advanced into Sicily to support Ahmad. Opos failed in this mission, and Ahmad was captured and killed by the Zirids, who subjected the Kalbid Emirate under Ifriqiyan hegemony. However, Opos' army was able to defeat the Zirid forces that opposed him in multiple battles, advancing as far as Palermo, where he rescued numerous Christians who had been enslaved in prior raids by the Sicilian Arabs, before returning to Italy. Furthermore, with the internal strife of the Kalbids, the Byzantine government under the new Emperor Michael IV, and his brother John the Orphanotrophos, had perceived an opportunity to recover the island of Sicily after half a century of Muslim rule. Consequently in 1037, the imperial government began preparations for an expedition to Sicily.

By spring 1038, the Byzantines had mustered an expeditionary force of at least 10,000 men in Italy, consisting of units from the Anatolikon, Armeniakon, Thrakesion, and Opsikion themes, in addition to which, there were up to 1,000 Varangian guardsmen under the exiled Norwegian prince Harald Sigurdsson. One of the commanders of the eastern Byzantine units present was Katakalon Kekaumenos. In Italy, up to 2,000 additional men had joined ranks with the Byzantines, of which 300-500 were Norman mercenaries under Arduin the Lombard and Rainulf Drengot, which included the brothers William Iron Arm and Drogo of Hauteville, while the rest were local recruits of Italian or Lombard origin. Michael and John appointed their brother in law, Stephen, as the archon of the naval forces accompanying the expedition, while the overall commander of the campaign was George Maniakes.

== Byzantine landing and capture of Messina ==
In summer 1038, the Byzantine expedition embarked across the Strait of Messina towards the northeastern coast of Sicily, possibly sailing to land on the beach at Pelorus, where the troops could disembark from their ships more easliy. The late 11th century historian Goffredo Malaterra describes a battle fought at the point of landing, wherein a Kalbid army from Messina attempted to repulse the Byzantine invasion attempt on a beach. Initially the Arabs resisted fiercely, and according to Malaterra even succeeding in forcing back part of the Byzantine line. However, the defenders were then forced back under pressure from the landing Byzantine and Norman troops who reinforced the bridgehead. After sustaining heavy losses the Kalbid army retreated, with part fleeing to Messina while the rest scattered into the Sicilian countryside. Skylitzes does not describe this battle in text, but an illustration in his Madrid Skylitzes depicts an engagement on a beach in Sicily, wherein Byzantine troops disembark from landing craft and cut down Arab warriors before a nearby fortress, likely depicting the fighting at Messina.

After disembarking his army, George Maniakes advanced towards Messina itself. With much of its population being Christians and allegiance to the Kalbids shaken by the failure of the latter to prevent the Byzantine landing, Messina capitulated to the Byzantines without need of a siege. With the capture of this port, the Byzantines had secured a line of communication and logistics to Byzantine Italy which would facilitate the continuation of their offensive into Sicily. George Maniakes secured and garrisoned Messina, which was to become the base of operations for the Sicilian expedition. The Byzantines proceeded southwards and engaged a combined Kalbid-Zirid army later that year in a battle near Rometta.

== Bibliography ==
- Hollway, Don (2021). The Last Viking. Bloomsbury. p. 157. ISBN 9781472846518.
- Wortley, John, ed. (2010). John Skylitzes: A Synopsis of Byzantine History, 811–1057. Cambridge: Cambridge University Press. ISBN 978-0-521-76705-7.
- Malaterra, Geoffrey (2005). The Deeds of Count Roger of Calabria & Sicily & of Duke Robert Guiscard his brother, Geoffrey Malaterra. Translated by Loud, Graham A. p. 3. Archived from the original on 3 March 2020.
- Treadgold, Warren (1997). A History of the Byzantine State and Society. Stanford, California: Stanford University Press. ISBN 978-0804779371.
- Kaldellis, Anthony (2017). Streams of Gold, Rivers of Blood: The Rise and Fall of Byzantium, 955 A.D. to the First Crusade. Oxford University Press. ISBN 978-0190253226.
- Biały, Kamil (2016). "From Conquest to the Failed Usurpation: Career of a Typical Byzantine Commander George Maniakes". Proslogion: Studies in Medieval and Early Modern Social History and Culture. Vol. 14. pp. 171–185.
