= Eastern Sicily =

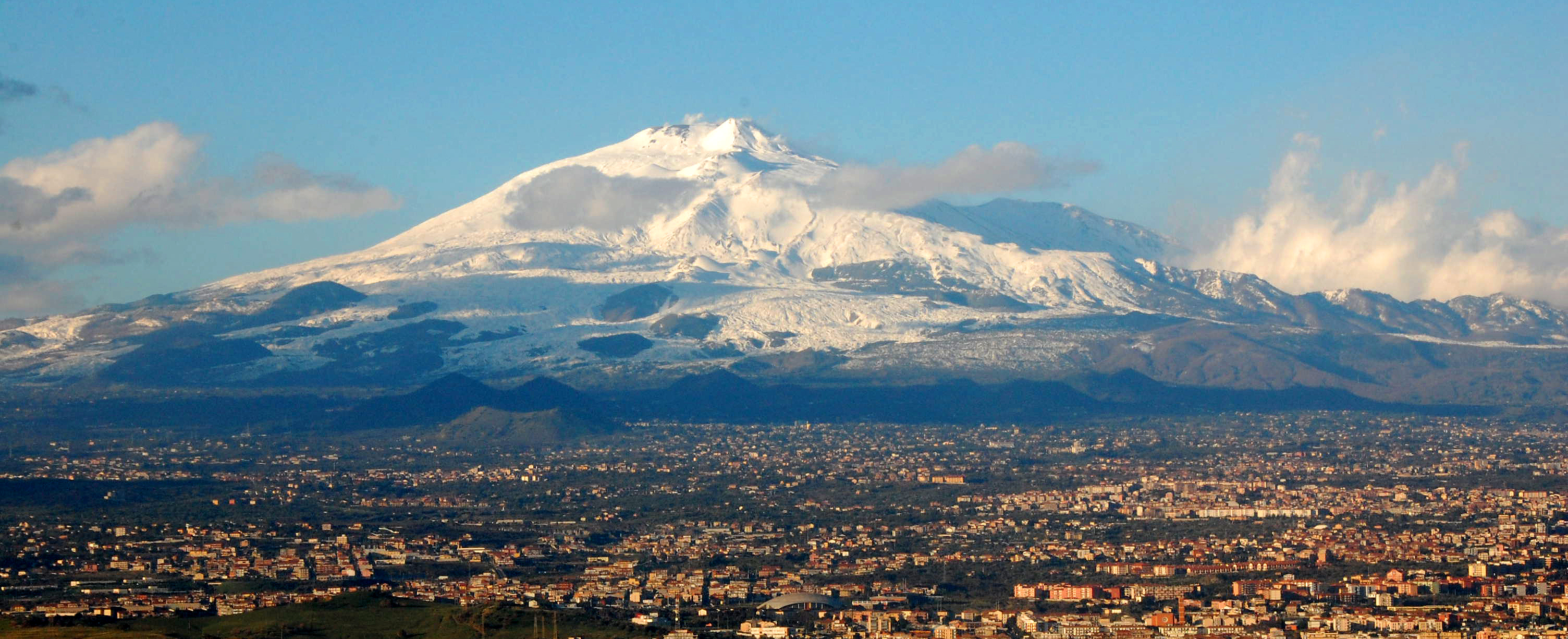

Eastern Sicily (Italian: Sicilia orientale) is an area formed by the territories of Sicily on the Ionian and Eastern Tyrrhenian coast of the isle, namely the provinces and metropolitan cities of Messina, Catania, Siracusa and Ragusa.

Eastern Sicily was originally settled by the tribe of the Sicels during the island's prehistory, and later on it was taken over by the Greeks.
