= George Maniakes =

Byzantine general (c. 998–1043)

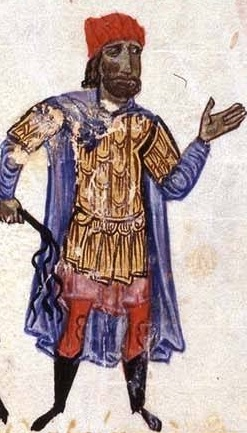
- Maniakes as depicted in the Madrid Skylitzes

Magistros
- Katepan of Italy; April 1042 – September 1042
- Monarchs: Zoe Porphyrogenita; Constantine IX Monomachos
- Preceded by: Synodianos
- Succeeded by: Pardos

Patrikios
- Strategos Autokrator of Italy; 1037–1040
- Monarch: Michael IV the Paphlagonian
- Katepan of Vaspurakan; September 1034 – c. 1037
- Monarch: Michael IV the Paphlagonian
- Preceded by: Constantine Kabasilas

Protospatharios
- Strategos of the Euphrates Cities c. 1032 – 1034
- Monarch: Romanos III Argyros
- Strategos of Telouch c. 1030 – c. 1032
- Monarch: Romanos III Argyros

Personal details
- Born: c. 998 Macedonia
- Died: 1043 Near Lake Vegoritida, west of Thessaloniki
- Parent: Goudelios Maniakes

Military service
- Allegiance: Byzantine Empire
- Years of service: c. 1030–1043
- Battles/wars: Arab–Byzantine wars; Battle of Messina; Battle of Rometta; Reconquest of Syracuse; Battle of Troina

George Maniakes (Greek: Γεώργιος Μανιάκης; (Note: Transliterated as Georgios Maniaces, Maniakis, or Maniaches.) Italian: Giorgio Maniace; died 1043) was a Byzantine army general during the 11th century. He was the catepan of Italy in 1042. He is known as Gyrgir in Scandinavian sagas. He is popularly said to have been extremely tall and well built, almost a giant.

== Biography ==
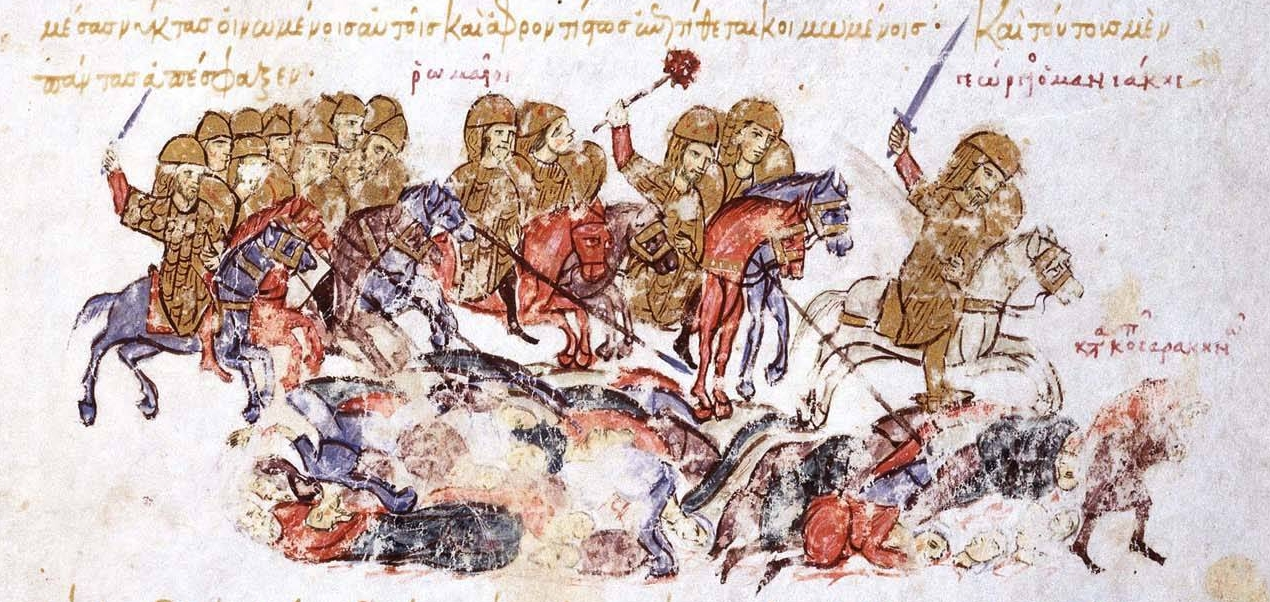
General Georgios Maniakes defeats the Arabs in battle.

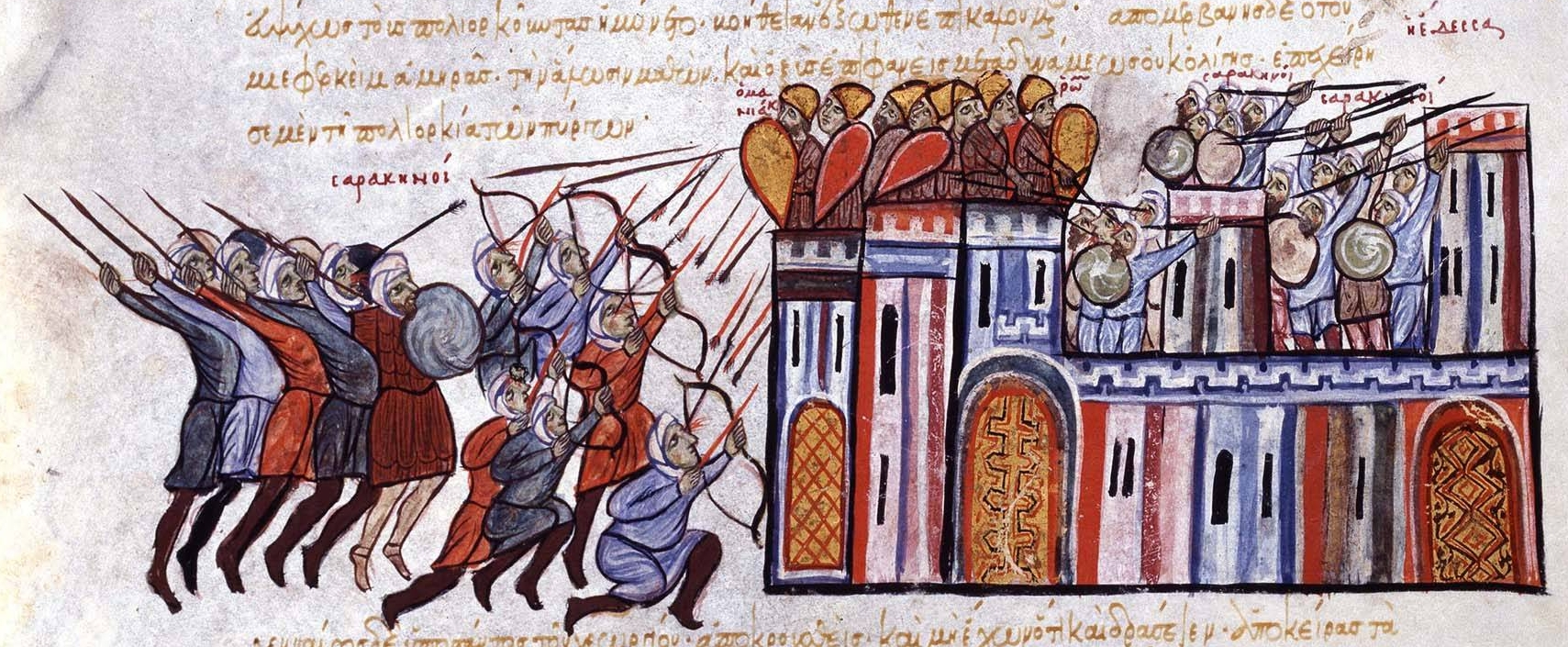
Maniakes defending Edessa.

Maniakes was a Greek general of the Byzantine Empire, who first came to prominence during a campaign in 1030–1031 when the Byzantine army was defeated at Aleppo, but went on to capture Edessa from the Arabs. His greatest achievement was the partial reconquest of Sicily from the Arabs beginning in 1038. He was aided by the Varangian Guard, then led by Harald Hardrada, who later became King of Norway. Also with him were Norman mercenaries under William de Hauteville, who earned his nickname Iron Arm by defeating the Emir of Syracuse in single combat. However, he soon ostracized his admiral, Stephen, whose wife was the sister of John the Eunuch, the highest-ranking man at court. He then publicly humiliated Arduin, the leader of the Lombard contingent, causing them to desert along with the Normans and Norsemen. In response, he was recalled by Emperor Michael IV, who was also Stephen's brother-in-law. Although the Arabs soon recaptured the island, Maniakes' successes there later inspired the Normans to invade Sicily themselves.

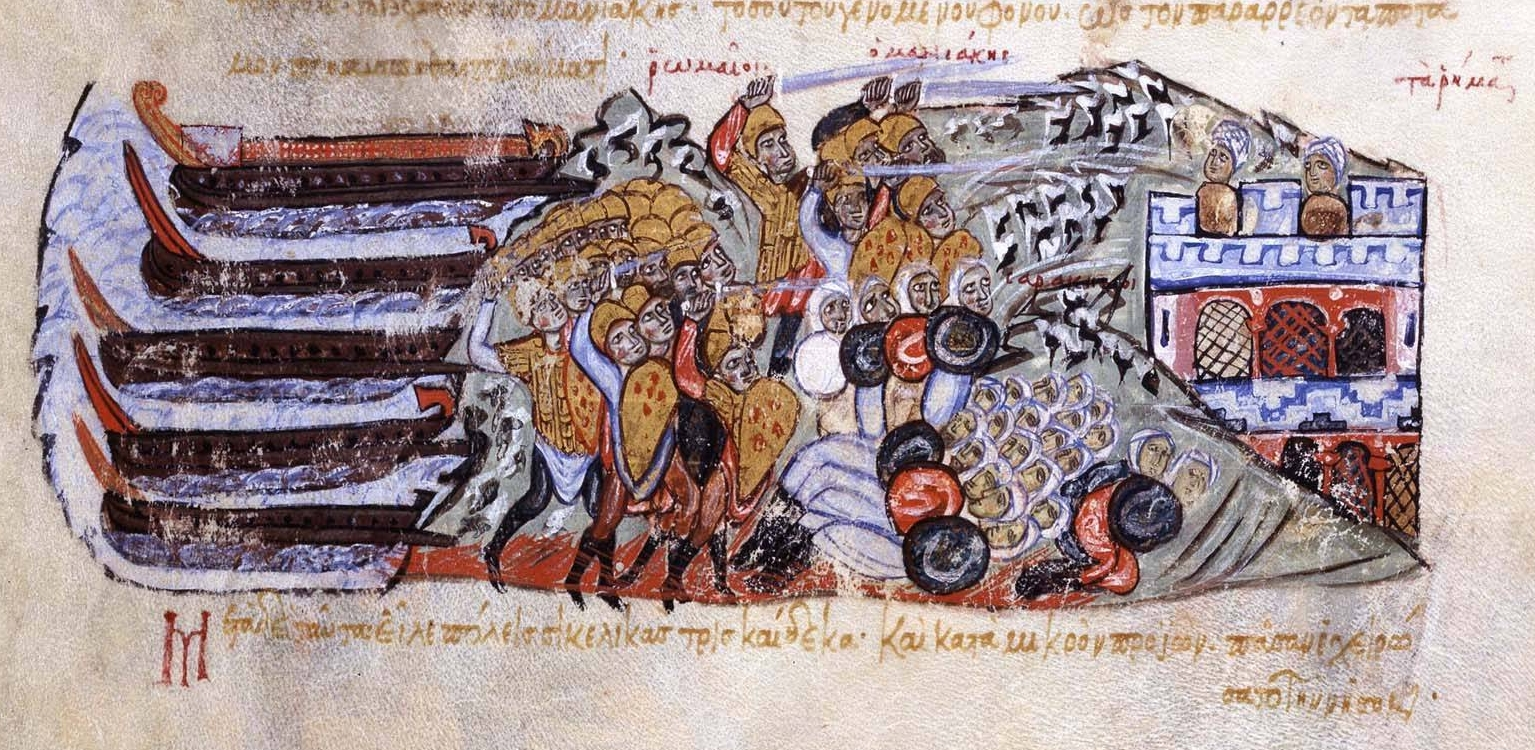
The Byzantines under George Maniakes land at Sicily and defeat the Arabs Georgios Maniakes reproaches admiral Stephanos.

Maniakes' achievements in Sicily were largely ignored by the emperor, and he revolted against Constantine IX in 1042, despite having been appointed catepan of Italy. The person most responsible for inciting Maniakes to revolt was one Romanus Sclerus. Sclerus, like Maniakes, was one of the immensely wealthy landowners who owned large areas of Anatolia - his estates bordered Maniakes', and the two were rumored to have attacked each other in a dispute over land. Sclerus owed his influence with the emperor to his famously charming sister, Maria Skleraina, who had a very positive influence on Constantine in most areas. Finding himself in a position of power, Sclerus used it to poison Constantine against Maniakes - ransacking his house and even seducing his wife, using the charm for which his family was famous. Maniakes' response to Sclerus' demand that he surrender command of the Empire's forces in Apulia was to torture him brutally; sealing his eyes, ears, nose, and mouth with excrement. Maniakes was then proclaimed emperor by his troops (including the Varangians) and marched on Constantinople. In 1043 his army clashed with troops loyal to Constantine near Thessalonica, and although initially successful, Maniakes was killed in the melee after receiving a fatal wound (according to Psellus' account). Constantine's extravagant punishment of the surviving rebels was to parade them in the hippodrome, sitting backwards on donkeys. His death put an end to the rebellion. In Sicily, the town of Maniace and the Syracusan fortress Castello Maniace are named after him.

== In popular culture ==
In the historical drama series Vikings: Valhalla, George Maniakes is played by actor Florian Munteanu. His portrayal in the series is highly fictionalized, with major deviations from historicity. As an example, George Maniakes rebelled against Emperor Constantine IX, not Emperor Romanos as depicted in the series.

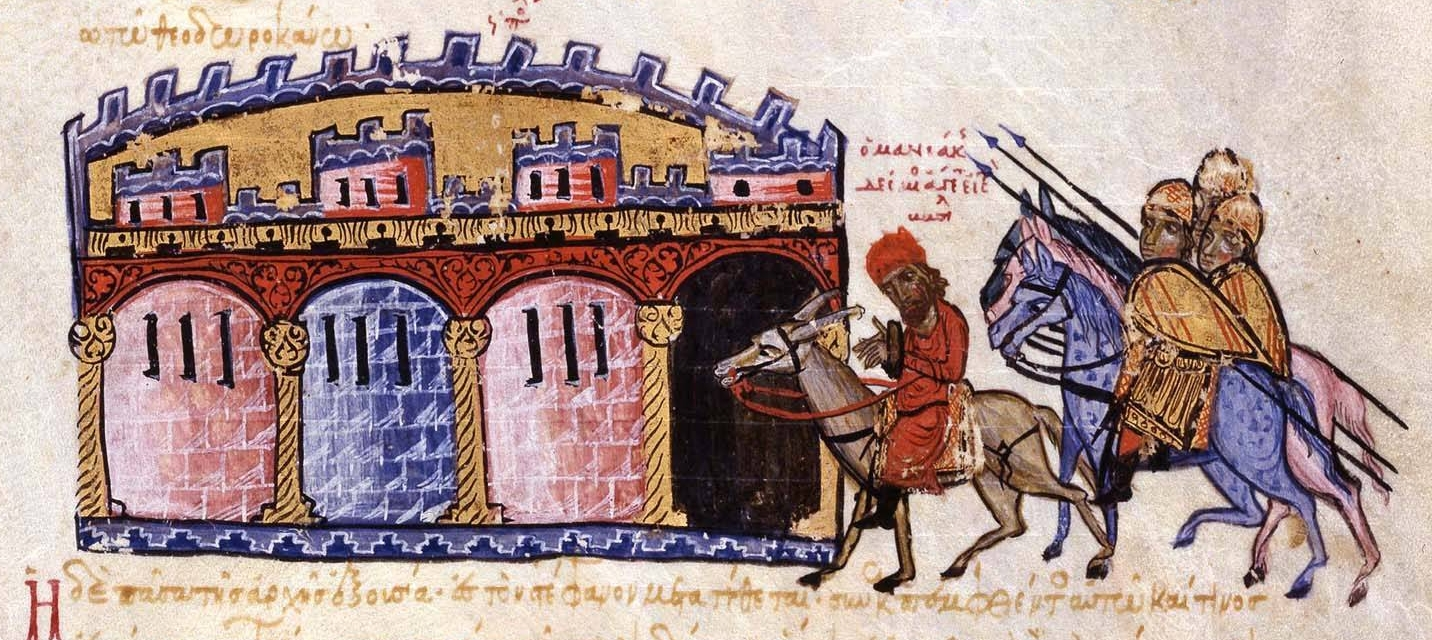
Maniakes is brought to Constantinople seated on a donkey

== Notes ==
Preceded by Synodianos	Catepan of Italy; 1042	Succeeded by Pardos
