= 11th century =

One hundred years, from 1001 to 1100

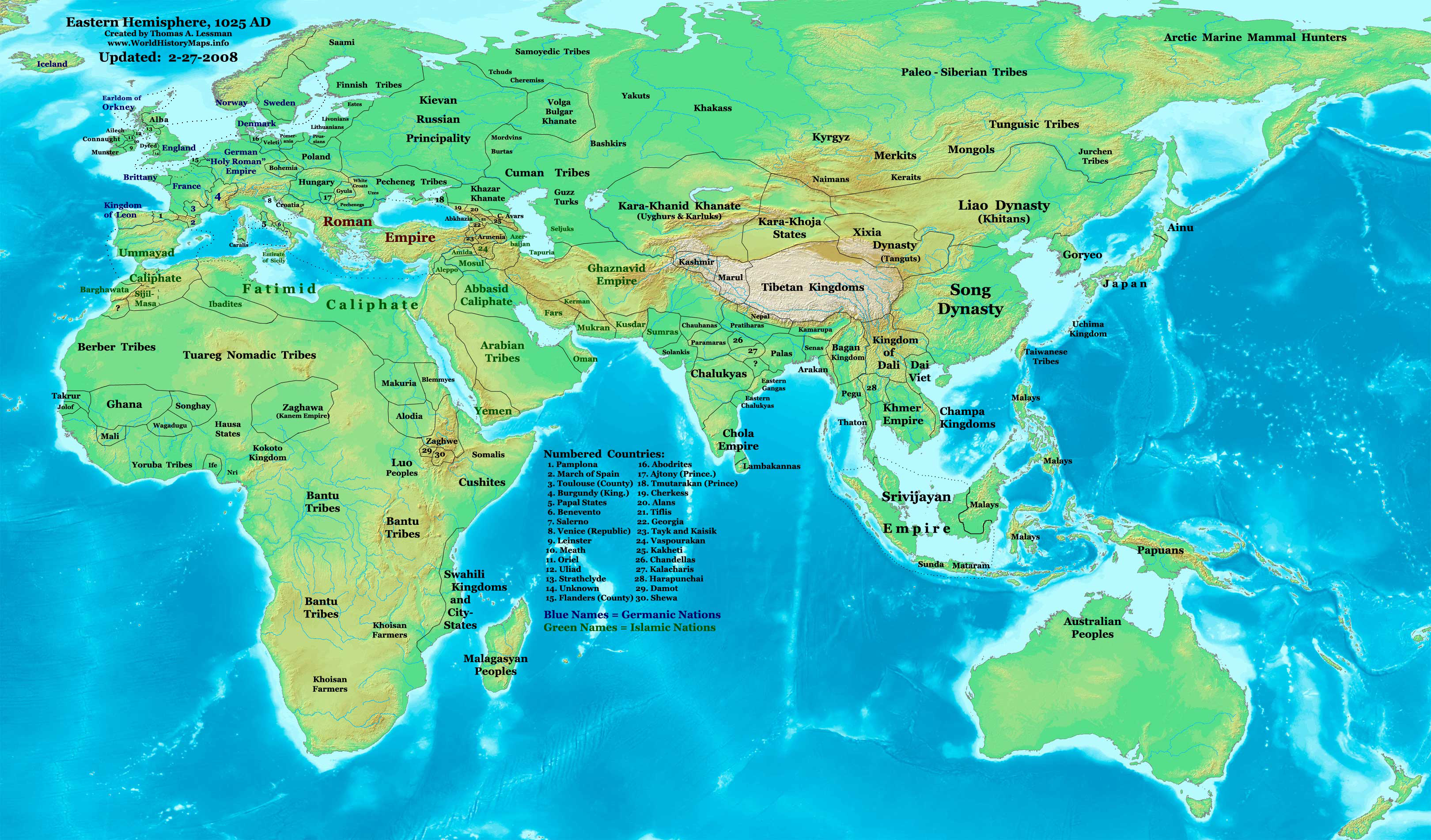
Political boundaries in Eastern Hemisphere in early half of 11th century

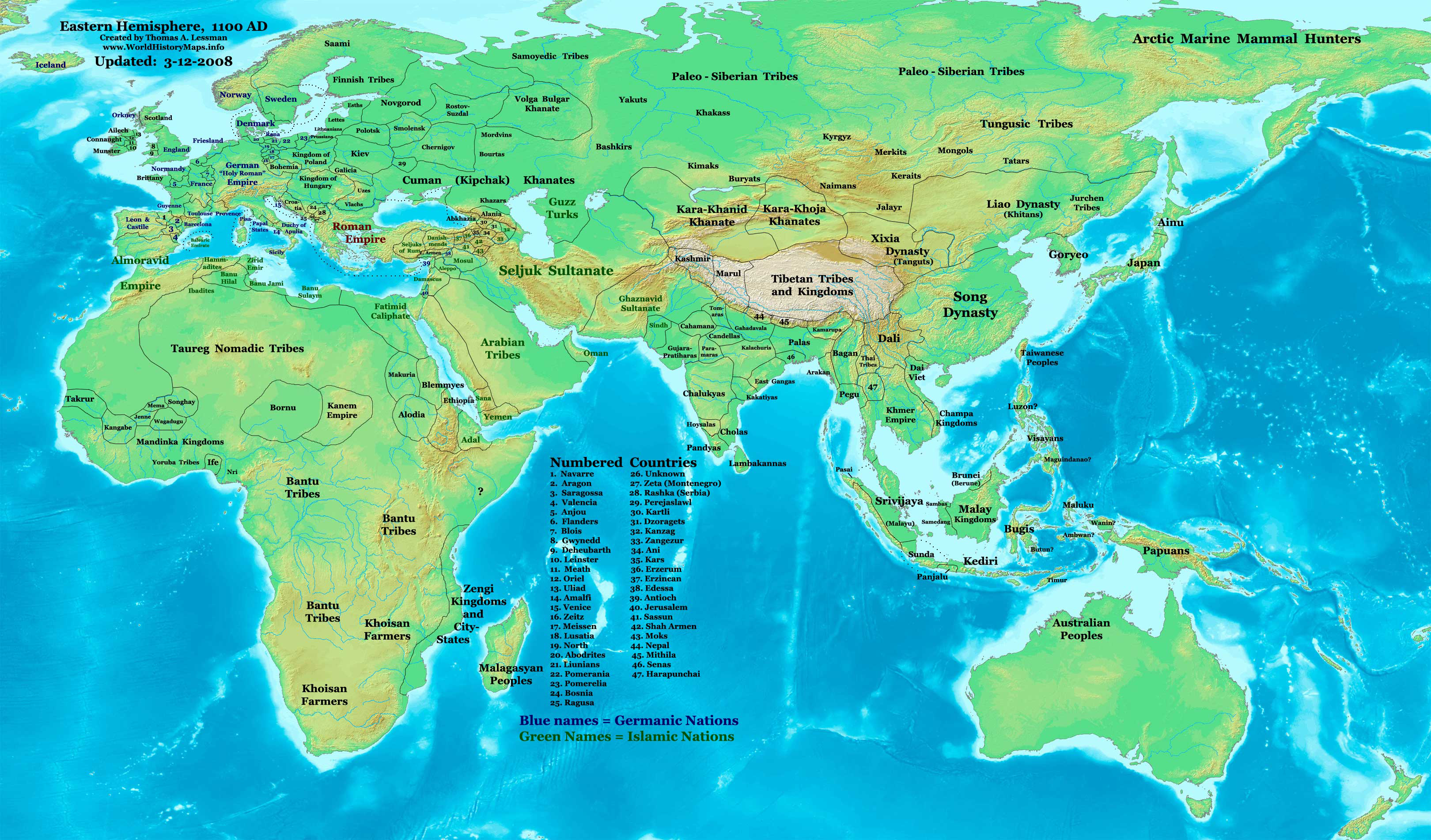
Political boundaries in Eastern Hemisphere at the end of the 11th century

The 11th century is the period from 1001 (represented by the Roman numerals MI) through 1100 (MC) in accordance with the Julian calendar, and the 1st century of the 2nd millennium.

In the history of Europe, this period is considered the early part of the High Middle Ages. There was, after a brief ascendancy, a sudden decline of Byzantine power and a rise of Norman domination over much of Europe, along with the prominent role in Europe of notably influential popes. Christendom experienced a formal schism in this century which had been developing over previous centuries between the Latin West and Byzantine East, causing a split in its two largest denominations to this day: Roman Catholicism and Eastern Orthodoxy.

In Song dynasty China and the classical Islamic world, this century marked the high point for both classical Chinese civilization, science and technology, and classical Islamic science, philosophy, technology and literature. Rival political factions at the Song dynasty court created strife amongst the leading statesmen and ministers of the empire. In Korea, the Goryeo Kingdom flourished and faced external threats from the Liao dynasty (Manchuria).

In this century the Turkic Seljuk dynasty comes to power in Western Asia over the now fragmented Abbasid realm, while the first of the Crusades were waged towards the close of the century. The Fatimid Caliphate in Egypt, the Ghaznavids, and the Chola dynasty in India had reached their zenith in military might and international influence. The Western Chalukya Empire (the Cholas' rivals) also rose to power by the end of the century. In Japan, the Fujiwara clan continued to dominate the affairs of state.

In the Americas, the Toltec and Mixtec civilizations flourished in Central America, along with the Wari culture of South America and the Mississippian culture of North America. The Tiwanaku Empire centered on Lake Titicaca collapsed in the first half of the century.

== Overview ==
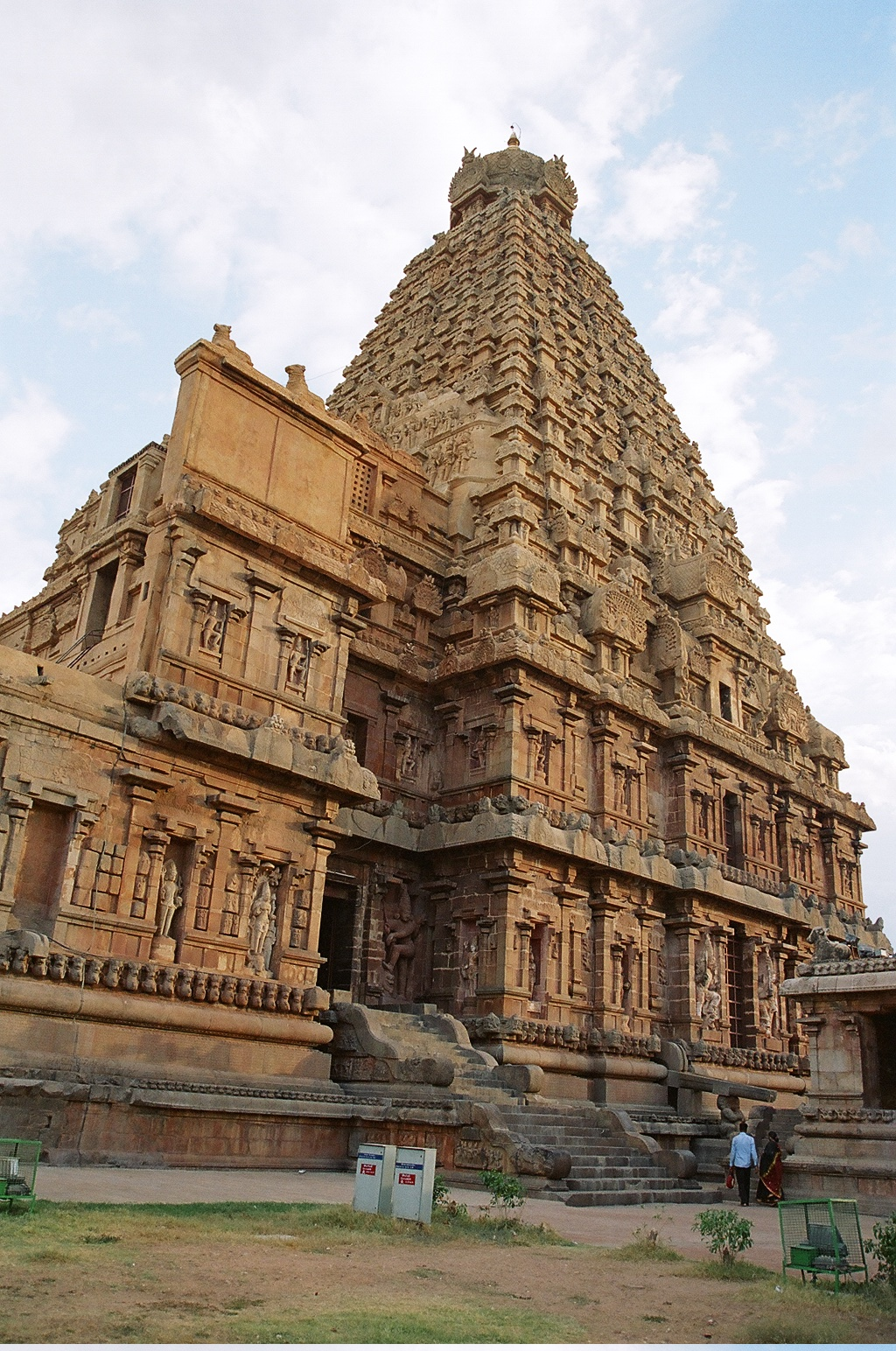
The Brihadeeswarar Temple of Chola era southern India, completed in 1010, during the reign of Rajaraja I

In European history, the 11th century is regarded as the beginning of the High Middle Ages, an age subsequent to the Early Middle Ages. The century began while the translatio imperii of 962 was still somewhat novel and ended in the midst of the Investiture Controversy. It saw the final Christianisation of Scandinavia and the emergence of the Peace and Truce of God movements, the Gregorian Reforms, and the Crusades which revitalised a church and a papacy that had survived tarnished by the tumultuous 10th century. In 1054, the Great Schism saw the political and religious culmination and a formal split between the Western and Eastern church.

In Germany, the century was marked by the ascendancy of the Holy Roman Emperors, who hit their high-water mark under the Salians. In Britain, it saw the transformation of Scotland into a single, more unified and centralised kingdom and the Norman conquest of England in 1066. The social transformations wrought in these lands brought them into the fuller orbit of European feudal politics. In France, it saw the nadir of the monarchy and the zenith of the great magnates, especially the dukes of Aquitaine and Normandy, who could thus foster such distinctive contributions of their lands as the pious warrior who conquered Britain, Italy, and the East and the impious peacelover, the troubadour, who crafted out of the European vernacular its first great literary themes. There were also the first figures of the intellectual movement known as Scholasticism, which emphasized dialectic arguments in disputes of Christian theology as well as classical philosophy.

In Italy, the century began with the integration of the kingdom into the Holy Roman Empire and the royal palace at Pavia was summoned in 1024. By the end of the century, Lombard and Byzantine rule in the Mezzogiorno had been usurped by the Normans and the power of the territorial magnates was being replaced by that of the citizens of the northern cities. In Northern Italy, a growth of population in urban centers gave rise to an early organized capitalism and more sophisticated, commercialized culture by the late 11th century, most notably in Venice. In Spain, the century opened with the successes of the last caliphs of Córdoba and ended in the successes of the Almoravids. In between was a period of Christian unification under Navarrese hegemony and success in the Reconquista against the taifa kingdoms that replaced the fallen caliphate. In Eastern Europe, there was a golden age for the principality of Kievan Rus.

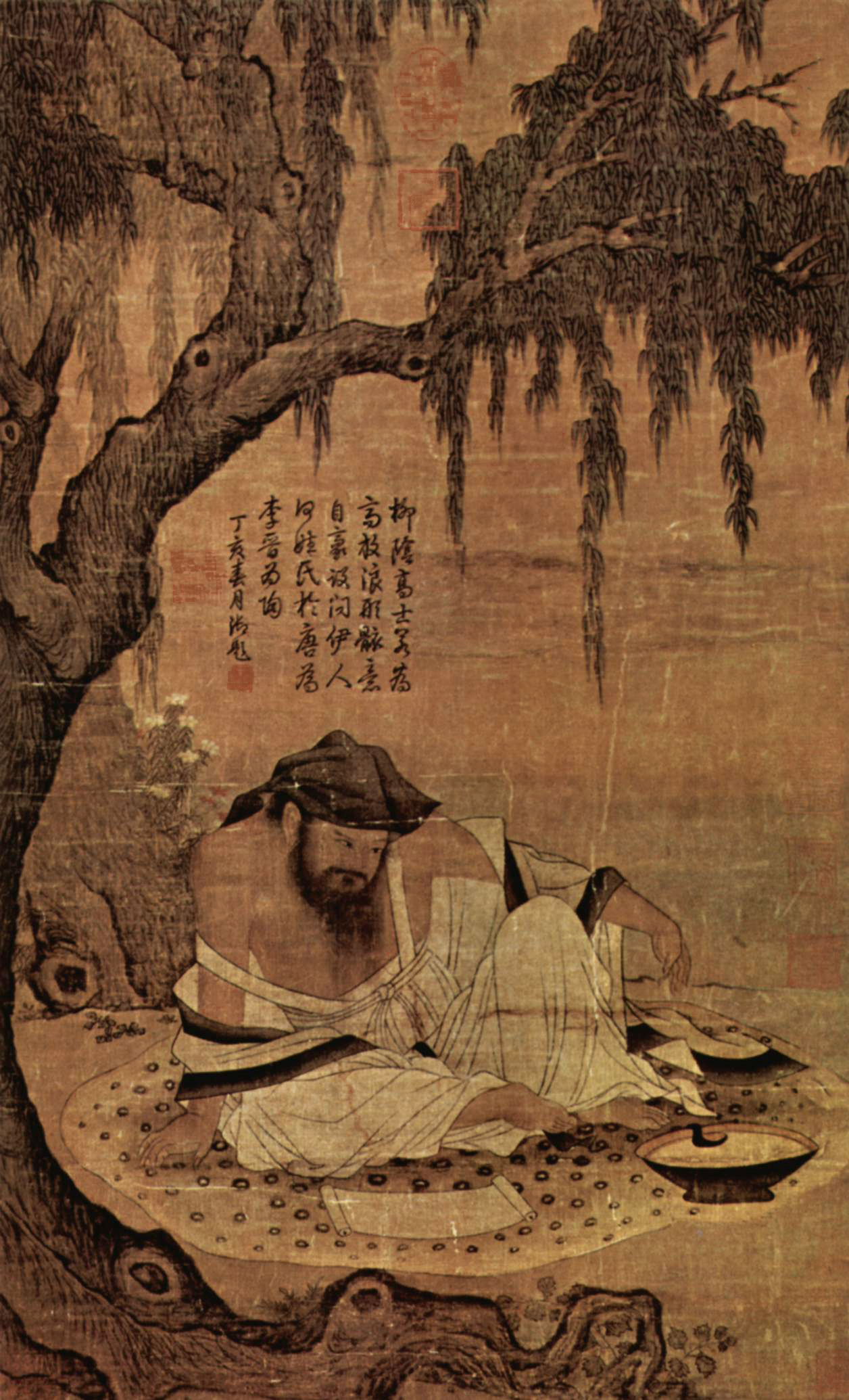
A Scholar in a Meadow, Chinese Song dynasty, 11th century

In China, there was a triangular affair of continued war and peace settlements between the Song dynasty, the Tanguts-led Western Xia in the northwest, and the Khitans of the Liao dynasty in the northeast. Meanwhile, opposing Political factions evolved at the Song imperial court of Kaifeng. The political reformers at court, called the New Policies Group (新法, Xin Fa), were led by Emperor Shenzong of Song and the Chancellors Fan Zhongyan and Wang Anshi, while the political conservatives were led by Chancellor Sima Guang and Empress Dowager Gao, regent of the young Emperor Zhezong of Song. Heated political debate and sectarian intrigue followed, while political enemies were often dismissed from the capital to govern frontier regions in the deep south where malaria was known to be very fatal to northern Chinese people (see History of the Song dynasty). This period also represents a high point in classical Chinese science and technology, with figures such as Su Song and Shen Kuo, as well as the age where the matured form of the Chinese pagoda was accomplished in Chinese architecture.

In Japan, the Fujiwara clan dominated central politics by acting as imperial regents, controlling the actions of the Emperor of Japan, who acted merely as a 'puppet monarch' during the Heian period. In Korea, the rulers of the Goryeo Kingdom were able to concentrate more central authority into their own hands than in that of the nobles, and were able to fend off two Khitan invasions with their armies.

In the Middle East, the Fatimid Empire of Egypt reached its zenith only to face steep decline, much like the Byzantine Empire in the first half of the century. The Seljuks came to prominence while the Abbasid caliphs held traditional titles without real, tangible authority in state affairs.

In India, the Chola dynasty reached its height of naval power under leaders such as Rajaraja Chola I and Rajendra Chola I, dominating southern India (Tamil Nadu), Sri Lanka, and regions of Southeast Asia. The Ghaznavid Empire would invade northwest India, an event that would pave the way to a series of later Muslim expansions into India.

In Southeast Asia, the Pagan Kingdom reached its height of political and military power. The Khmer Empire would dominate in Mainland Southeast Asia while Srivijaya would dominate Maritime Southeast Asia. Further east, the Kingdom of Butuan, centered on the northern portion of Mindanao island flourished as the dominant trading polity in the archipelago. In Vietnam, the Lý dynasty began, which would reach its golden era during the 11th century.

In Nigeria, formation of city states, kingdoms and empires, including Hausa kingdoms and Borno dynasty in the north, and the Oyo Empire and Kingdom of Benin in the south.

== Events ==
=== 1001–1009 ===
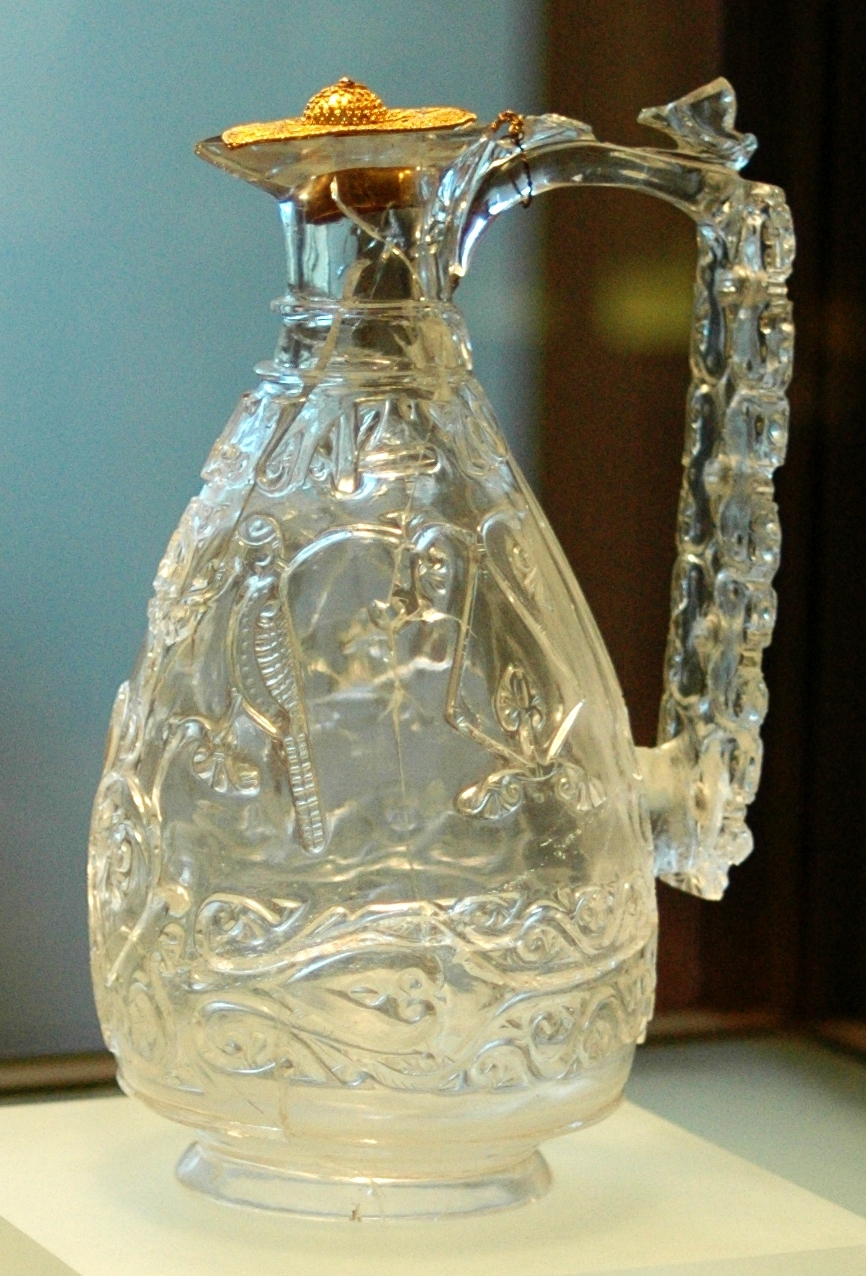
An 11th-century rock crystal ewer of Fatimid Egypt

- 1001: Mahmud of Ghazni, Muslim leader of Ghazni, begins a series of raids into Northern India; he finishes in 1027 with the destruction of Somnath.
- c. 1001: Norsemen, led by Leif Eriksson, establish short-lived settlements in and around Vinland in North America.
- 1001–1008: Japanese Lady Murasaki Shikibu writes The Tale of Genji.
- 1001 ± 40 years: Baitoushan volcano on what would be the Chinese-Korean border, erupts with a force of 6.5, the fourth largest Holocene blast.
- 1001: The ancient kingdom of Butuan, through its King, Rajah Kiling, made contact with the Chinese, Song dynasty recorded the first appearance of Butuan tributary mission through Lijehan and Jiaminan at the Chinese Imperial Court on March 17, 1001 AD.
- 1003: Robert II of France invades the Duchy of Burgundy, then ruled by Otto-William, Duke of Burgundy; the initial invasion is unsuccessful, but Robert II eventually gains the acceptance of the Roman Catholic Church in 1016 and annexes Burgundy into his realm.
- 1004: Song dynasty court prohibited Butuan from exporting several items with their predilection due to issues on rules and regulation.
- 1004: The library and university Dar Al-Hekma is founded in Egypt under the Fatimids.
- 1005: The Treaty of Shanyuan is signed between the Chinese Song dynasty and the Khitan Liao dynasty.
- 1006: King Dharmawangsa's Mataram kingdom falls under the invasion of King Wurawari from Lwaram (highly possible Srivijayan ally in Java).
- 1007: Butuan king, Rajah Kiling through the ambassador I-hsu-han sent a formal memorial on Song dynasty Imperial court requesting equal status with Champa but the request was denied on the grounds that "Butuan is beneath Champa." due to Champa being an older tributary state since the 4th century.
- 1008: The Fatimid Egyptian sea captain Domiyat travels to the Buddhist pilgrimage site in Shandong, China, to seek out the Chinese Emperor Zhenzong of Song with gifts from his ruling Imam Al-Hakim bi-Amr Allah, successfully reopening diplomatic relations between Egypt and China that had been lost since the collapse of the Tang dynasty.
- 1009: Lý Thái Tổ overthrows the Anterior Lê dynasty of Vietnam, establishing the Lý dynasty.
- 1009–1010: The Lombard known as Melus of Bari leads an insurrection against the Byzantine Catepan of Italy, John Curcuas, as the latter was killed in battle and replaced by Basil Mesardonites, who brought Byzantine reinforcements.

=== 1010s ===
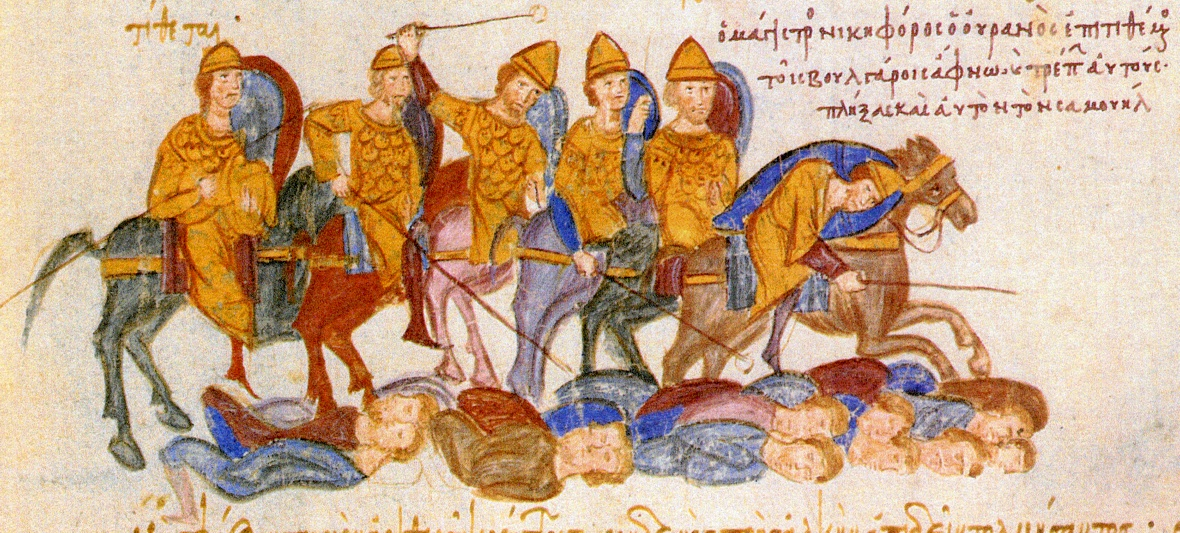
Defeat of the Bulgarians by the Byzantines depicted in the Madrid Skylitzes

- 1010–1011: The Second Goryeo-Khitan War; the Korean king is forced to flee the capital temporarily, but is unable to establish a foothold and fearing a counterattack, the Khitan forces withdrew.
- 1011–1021: Ibn al-Haytham (Alhacen), a famous Iraqi scientist working in Egypt, feigns madness in fear of angering the Egyptian caliph Al-Hakim bi-Amr Allah, and is kept under house arrest from 1011 to 1021. During this time, he writes his influential Book of Optics.
- 1011: Under a new Rajah named Sri Bata Shaja, Butuan finally succeeded in attaining diplomatic equality with Champa after being denied in an older request made 4 years earlier to the Song dynasty court by sending the flamboyant ambassador Likanhsieh.
- 1013: Danish king Sweyn Forkbeard conquers England.
- 1014: The Byzantine armies of Basil II are victorious over Samuil of Bulgaria in the Battle of Kleidion.
- 1014: The Gaelic forces of Munster and most other Irish kingdoms under High King Brian Boru defeat a combined Leinster-Viking force in the Battle of Clontarf but Brian Boru is killed at the end of the battle.
- 1014–1020: The Book of Healing, a vast philosophical and scientific encyclopaedia, is written by Avicenna, Persian scholar.
- 1015: In the Battle of Nesjar in Oslofjord, Norway, the forces of Olav Haraldsson fought the forces of Sveinn Hákonarson, with a victory for Olav.
- 1018: The First Bulgarian Empire is conquered by the Byzantine Empire
- 1018: The Byzantine armies of Basil Boioannes are victorious at the Battle of Cannae against the Lombards under Melus of Bari.
- 1018: The Third Goryeo-Khitan War; the Korean General Kang Kam-ch'an inflicted heavy losses to Khitan forces at the Battle of Kwiju. The Khitans withdrew and both sides signed a peace treaty.
- 1019: Airlangga establishes the Kingdom of Kahuripan.

=== 1020s ===
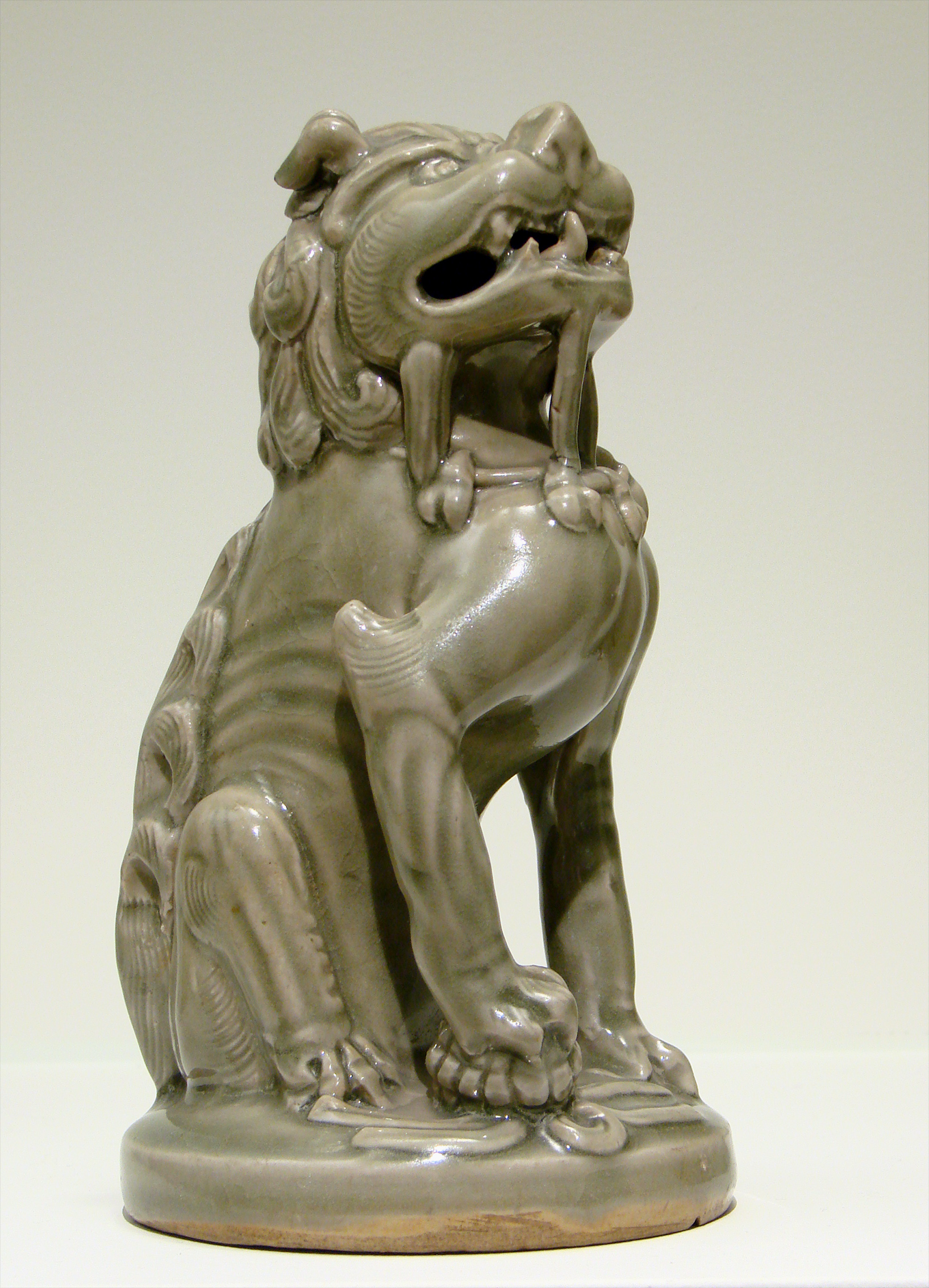
Celadon statue of an imperial guardian lion of the Chinese Song dynasty, 11th or 12th century

- 1021: the ruling Fatimid Caliph Al-Hakim bi-Amr Allah disappears suddenly, possibly assassinated by his own sister Sitt al-Mulk, which leads to the open persecution of the Druze by Ismaili Shia; the Druze proclaim that Al-Hakim went into hiding (ghayba), whereupon he would return as the Mahdi savior.
- 1025: the Chola dynasty of India uses its naval powers to conquer the South East Asian kingdom of Srivijaya, turning it into a vassal.
- 1025: ruler Rajendra Chola I moves the capital city of the empire from Thanjavur to Gangaikonda Cholapuram
- 1025: Rajendra Chola, the Chola king from Cholamandala in South India, conquers Pannai and Kadaram from Srivijaya and occupies it for some time. The Cholas continue a series of raids and conquests of parts Srivijayan empire in Sumatra and the Malay Peninsula.
- 1028: the King of Srivijaya appeals to the Song dynasty Chinese, sending a diplomatic mission to their capital at Kaifeng.

=== 1030s ===
- 1030: Stephen I of the Kingdom of Hungary defeats Conrad II of the Holy Roman Empire; after the war, Conrad had ceded the lands between the rivers Leitha and Fischa to Hungary in the summer of 1031.
- 1030: the Battle of Stiklestad (Norway): Olav Haraldsson loses to his pagan vassals and is killed in the battle. He is later canonized and becomes the patron saint of Norway and Rex perpetuum Norvegiae ('the eternal king of Norway').
- 1030: Sanghyang Tapak inscription in the Cicatih River bank in Cibadak, Sukabumi, West Java, mentioned about the establishment of sacred forest and Kingdom of Sunda. (to 1579)
- 1033: An earthquake strikes the Jordan Valley, followed by a tsunami along the Mediterranean coast, killing tens of thousands.
- 1035: Raoul Glaber chronicles a devastating three-year famine induced by climatic changes in southern France
- 1035: Canute the Great dies, and his kingdom of present-day Norway, England, and Denmark was split amongst three rivals to his throne.
- 1035: William Iron Arm ventures to the Mezzogiorno
- 1037: Ferdinand I of León conquers the Kingdom of Galicia.

=== 1040s ===
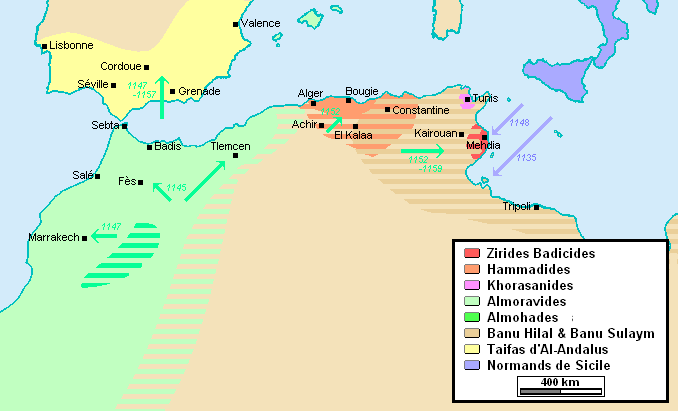
Territories of Zirids and Hammadids after the invasions of Banu Hilal, of Norman incursions and the weakening of the Almoravids

- 1040: Duncan I of Scotland slain in battle. Macbeth succeeds him.
- 1041: Samuel Aba became King of Hungary.
- 1041: Airlangga divides Kahuripan into two kingdoms Janggala and Kadiri and abdicates in favour of his successors.
- 1042: the Normans establish Melfi as the capital of southern Italy.
- 1041–1048: Chinese artisan Bi Sheng invents ceramic movable type printing
- 1043: the Byzantine Empire and Kievan Rus engage in a naval confrontation, although a later treaty is signed between two parties that includes the marriage alliance of Vsevolod I of Kiev to a princess daughter of Constantine IX Monomachos.
- 1043: the Byzantine General George Maniaces, who had served in Sicily back in 1038, is proclaimed emperor by his troops while he is catepan of Italy; he leads an unsuccessful rebellion against Constantine IX Monomachos and is killed in battle in Macedonia during his march towards Constantinople.
- 1043: the Song dynasty Chancellor of China, Fan Zhongyan, and prominent official and historian Ouyang Xiu introduce the Qingli Reforms, which would be rescinded by the court in 1045 due to partisan resistance to reforms.
- 1043: the Kingdom of Nri of West Africa is said to have started in this year with Eze Nri Ìfikuánim
- 1044: the Chinese Wujing Zongyao, written by Zeng Gongliang and Yang Weide, is the first book to describe gunpowder formulas; it also described their use in warfare, such as blackpowder-impregnated fuses for flamethrowers. It also described an early form of the compass, a thermoremanence compass.
- 1044: Henry III of the Holy Roman Empire defeats the Kingdom of Hungary in the Battle of Ménfő; Peter Urseolo captured Samuel Aba after the battle, executing him, and restoring his claim to the throne; the Kingdom of Hungary then briefly becomes a vassal to the Holy Roman Empire.
- 1045: The Zirids, a Berber dynasty of North Africa, break their allegiance with the Fatimid court of Egypt and recognize the Abbasids of Baghdad as the true caliphs.

=== 1050s ===
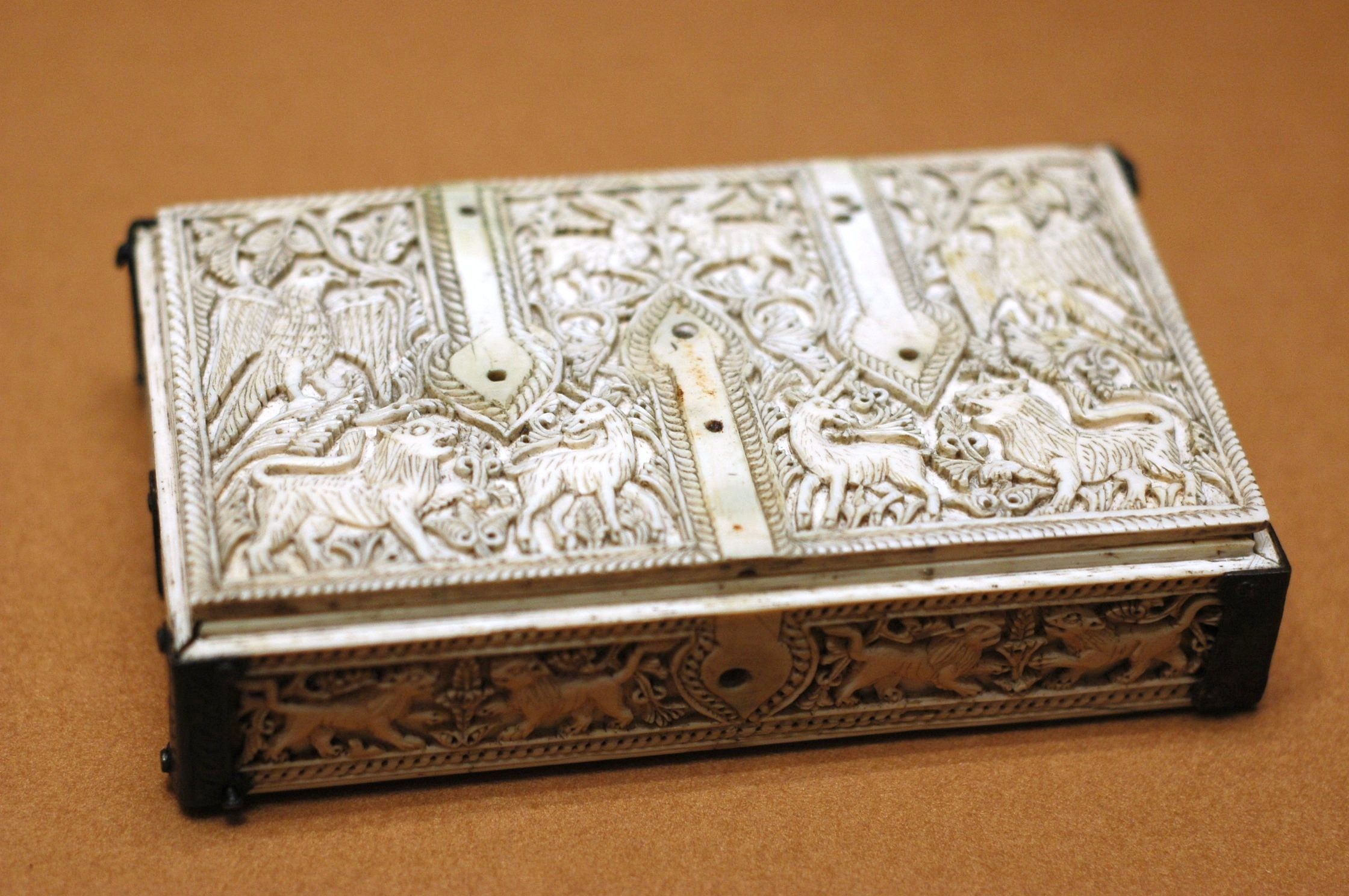
A flat casket carved out of ivory from Al-Andalus (Islamic Spain), c. 1050

- 1052: Fujiwara no Yorimichi converts the rural villa at Byōdō-in into a famous Japanese Buddhist temple.
- 1053: the Norman commander Humphrey of Hauteville is victorious in the Battle of Civitate against the Lombards and the papal coalition led by Rudolf of Benevento; Pope Leo IX himself is captured by the Normans.
- 1054: the Great Schism, in which the Western (Roman Catholic) and Eastern Orthodox churches separated from each other. Similar schisms in the past had been later repaired, but this one continues after nearly 1000 years.
- 1054: a large supernova is observed by astronomers, the remnants of which would form the Crab Nebula.
- 1054: the Battle of Atapuerca is fought between García V of Navarre and Ferdinand I of León.
- 1055: the Seljuk Turks capture Baghdad, taking the Buyid Emir Al-Malik al-Rahim prisoner.
- 1056: Ferdinand I of León, King of Castile and King of León, is crowned Imperator totius Hispaniae (Emperor of All Hispania).
- 1056: William II of England the son of William the Conqueror, was born.
- 1057: Anawrahta, ruler of the Pagan Kingdom, defeated the Mon city of Thaton, thus unifying all of Myanmar.
- 1057: Macbeth, king of Scotland, dies in battle against the future king Malcolm III.
- 1057: Invasion of the Banu Hilal, Kairouan destroyed, Zirids reduced to a tiny coastal strip, remainder fragments into petty Bedouin emirates.

=== 1060s ===
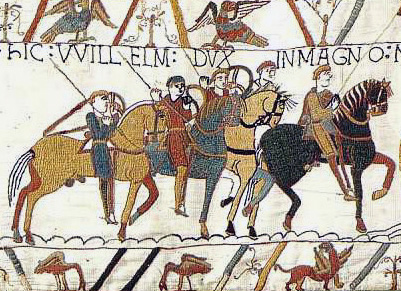
The Bayeux Tapestry depicting events leading to the Battle of Hastings in 1066

- 1061–1091: Norman conquest of Sicily in the Mediterranean Sea
- 1064-1065: The Great German Pilgrimage, consisting of around unarmed 7,000 pilgrims, travels to Jerusalem under the leadership of Gunther of Bamberg.
- 1065: Seljuks first invasion to Georgia under leadership of Alp Arslan
- 1065: Independence of the Kingdom of Galicia and Portugal under the rule of Garcia
- 1066: in the Battle of Stamford Bridge, the last Anglo-Saxon King Harold Godwinson defeated his brother Tostig Godwinson and Harold III of Norway.
- 1066: Edward the Confessor dies; Harold Godwinson is killed in the Battle of Hastings, while the Norman William the Conqueror is crowned king of England. This is what most experts think of as the end of the Viking age.
- 1066: the Jewish vizier Joseph ibn Naghrela and many others are killed in the 1066 Granada massacre.
- 1068–1073: the reign of Japanese Emperor Go-Sanjō brings about a brief period where central power is taken out of the hands of the Fujiwara clan.
- 1068: Virarajendra Chola begins sending military raids into Malaysia and Indonesia.
- 1068: Seljuks destroyed Georgia for the second time
- 1069–1076: with the support of Emperor Shenzong of Song, Chancellor Wang Anshi of the Chinese Song dynasty introduces the 'New Policies', including the Baojia system of societal organization and militias, low-cost loans for farmers, taxes instead of corvée labor, government monopolies on tea, salt, and wine, reforming the land survey system, and eliminating the poetry requirement in the imperial examination system to gain bureaucrats of a more practical bent.

=== 1070s ===
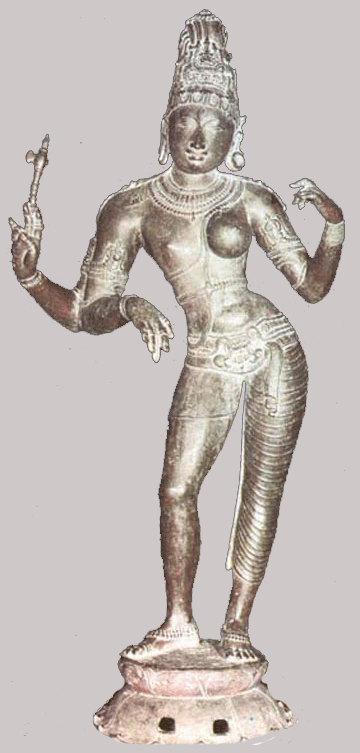
An 11th-century Chola dynasty bronze figurine of Arthanariswara

- 1070: the death of Athirajendra Chola and the ascension of Kulothunga Chola I marks the transition between the Medieval Cholas and the Chalukya Cholas.
- 1071: Defeat of the Byzantine Empire at the Battle of Manzikert by the Seljuk army of Alp Arslan, ending three centuries of a Byzantine military and economic Golden Age.
- 1072: the Battle of Golpejera is fought between Sancho II of Castile and Alfonso VI of Castile
- 1073: the Seljuk Turks capture Ankara from the Byzantines.
- 1074: the Seljuk Turks capture Jerusalem from the Fatimids, and cut pilgrim transit.
- 1075: Henry IV suppresses the rebellion of Saxony in the First Battle of Langensalza.
- 1075: the Investiture Controversy is sparked when Pope Gregory VII asserted in the Dictatus papae extended rights granted to the pope (disturbing the balance of power) and a new interpretation of God's role in founding the Church itself.
- 1075: Chinese official and diplomat Shen Kuo asserts the Song dynasty's rightful border lines by using court archives against the bold bluff of Emperor Daozong of Liao, who had asserted that Liao dynasty territory exceeded its earlier-accepted bounds.
- 1075–1076: a civil war in the Western Chalukya Empire of India; the Western Chalukya monarch Someshvara II plans to defeat his own ambitious brother Vikramaditya VI by allying with a traditional enemy, Kulothunga Chola I of the Chola Empire; Someshvara's forces suffer a heavy defeat, and he is eventually captured and imprisoned by Vikramaditya, who proclaimed himself king.
- 1075–1077: the Song dynasty of China and the Lý dynasty of Vietnam fight a border war, with Vietnamese forces striking first on land and with their navy, and afterwards Song armies advancing as far as modern-day Hanoi, the capital, but withdraw after Lý makes peace overtures; in 1082, both sides exchange the territories that they had captured during the war, and later a border agreement is reached.
- 1076: the Ghana Empire is attacked by the Almoravids, who sack the capital of Koumbi Saleh, ending the rule of king Tunka Manin
- 1076: the Chinese Song dynasty places strict government monopolies over the production and distribution of sulfur and saltpetre, in order to curb the possibility of merchants selling gunpowder formula components to enemies such as the Tanguts and Khitans.
- 1076: the Song Chinese allies with southern Vietnamese Champa and Cambodian Chenla to conquer the Lý dynasty, which is an unsuccessful campaign.
- 1077: the Walk to Canossa by Henry IV of the Holy Roman Empire.
- 1077: Chinese official Su Song is sent on a diplomatic mission to the Liao dynasty and discovers that the Khitan calendar is more mathematically accurate than the Song calendar; Emperor Zhezong later sponsors Su Song's astronomical clock tower in order to compete with Liao astronomers.
- 1078: Oleg I of Chernigov is defeated in battle by his brother Vsevolod I of Kiev; Oleg escapes to Tmutarakan, but is imprisoned by the Khazars, sent to Constantinople as a prisoner, and then exiled to Rhodes.
- 1078: the revolt of Nikephoros III against Byzantine ruler Michael VII
- 1079: Malik Shah I reforms the Iranian Calendar.
- 1079: Franks start to settle around the Way of Saint James (Today, modern North Spain)

=== 1080s ===
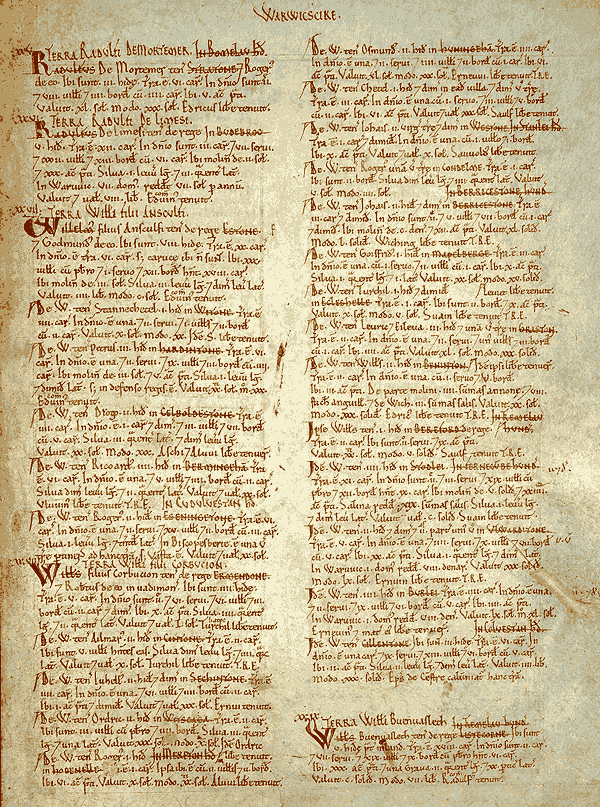
A page of the Domesday Book of England

- 1080–1081: The Chinese statesman and scientist Shen Kuo is put in command of the campaign against the Western Xia, and although he successfully halts their invasion route to Yanzhou (modern Yan'an), another officer disobeys imperial orders and the campaign is ultimately a failure because of it.
- 1081: birth of Urraca of León and Castile future Queen of Castille and León.
- 1084: the enormous Chinese historical work of the Zizhi Tongjian is compiled by scholars under Chancellor Sima Guang, completed in 294 volumes and included 3 million written Chinese characters
- 1085: Alfonso VI of Castile captures the Moorish Muslim city of Toledo, Spain.
- 1085: the Katedralskolan, Lund school of Sweden is established by Canute IV of Denmark
- 1086: compilation of the Domesday Book by order of William I of England; it was similar to a modern-day government census, as it was used by William to thoroughly document all the landholdings within the kingdom that could be properly taxed.
- 1086: the Battle of az-Zallaqah between the Almoravids and Castilians
- 1087: a new office at the Chinese international seaport of Quanzhou is established to handle and regulate taxes and tariffs on all mercantile transactions of foreign goods coming from Africa, Arabia, India, Sri Lanka, Persia, and South East Asia.
- 1087: the Italian cities of Genoa and Pisa engage in the African Mahdia campaign
- 1087: William II of England, son of William the Conqueror, is crowned king of England.
- 1088: the renowned polymath Chinese scientist and official Shen Kuo made the world's first reference to the magnetic compass in his book Dream Pool Essays, along with encyclopedic documentation and inquiry into scientific discoveries.
- 1088: The University of Bologna is established.
- 1088: Rebellion of 1088 against William II of England led by Odo of Bayeux.

=== 1090–1100 ===
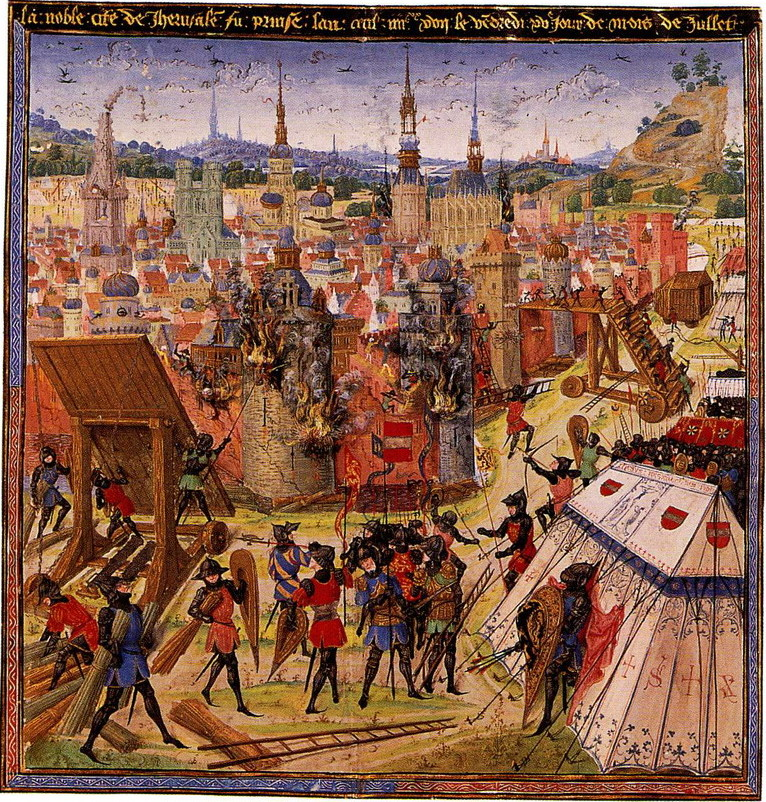
Siege of Jerusalem (1099)

- 1091: Normans from the Duchy of Normandy take control of Malta and surrounding islands.
- 1091: the Byzantine Empire under Alexios I Komnenos and his Cuman allies defeat Pechenegs at the Battle of Levounion
- 1093: Vikramaditya VI, ruler of the Western Chalukya Empire, defeats the army of Kulothunga Chola I in the Battle of Vengi.
- 1093: when the Chinese Empress Dowager Gao dies, the conservative faction that had followed Sima Guang is ousted from court, the liberal reforms of Wang Anshi reinstated, and Emperor Zhezong of Song halted all negotiations with the Tanguts of the Western Xia, resuming in armed conflict with them.
- 1093: the Kipchaks defeat princes of Kievan Rus at the Battle of the Stugna River
- 1093: Battle of Alnwick: Malcolm III of Scotland is killed by the forces of William II of England.
- 1094: the astronomical clock tower of Kaifeng, China—engineered by the official Su Song—is completed.
- 1094: El Cid, the great Spanish hero, conquers the Muslim city of Valencia
- 1094: a succession crisis following the reign of the Fatimid Caliph Ma'ad al-Mustansir Billah sparks a rebellion which leads to the split of Ismaili Shia into the new Nizari religious branch.
- 1095: Pope Urban II calls upon Western Europeans to take up the cross and reclaim the Holy Lands, officially commencing the First Crusade.
- c. 1095–1099: earliest extant manuscript of the Song of Roland
- 1096: University of Oxford in England holds its first lectures
- 1097: the Siege of Nicaea during the First Crusade
- 1097: Diego Rodriguez, a son of El Cid, dies in the Battle of Consuegra, an Almoravid victory
- 1098: the Siege of Antioch during the First Crusade
- 1098: Pope Urban II makes an appearance at the Siege of Capua
- 1098: the Dongpo Academy of Hainan, China is built in honor of the Song dynasty Chinese official and poet Su Shi, who was exiled there for criticizing reforms of the New Policies Group.
- 1098: the birth of Hildegard of Bingen, Doctor of the Church, abbess, monastic leader, mystic, prophetess, medical, German composer and writer, polymath.
- 1099: the Siege of Jerusalem by European Crusaders.
- 1099: after the Kingdom of Jerusalem is established, the Al-Aqsa Mosque is made into the residential palace for the kings of Jerusalem.
- 1099: death of the great Spanish hero Rodrigo Díaz "El Cid Campeador".
- 1099: after building considerable strength, David IV of Georgia discontinues tribute payments to the Seljuk Turks.
- 1100: On August 5, Henry I is crowned King of England.
- 1100: On December 25, Baldwin of Boulogne is crowned as the first King of Jerusalem in the Church of the Nativity in Bethlehem.

=== Undated ===
- King Anawrahta of Myanmar made a pilgrimage to Ceylon, returning to convert his country to Theravada Buddhism.
- The Tuareg migrate to the Aïr region.
- Kanem-Bornu expands southward into modern Nigeria.
- The first of seven Hausa city-states are founded in Nigeria.
- The Hodh region of Mauritania becomes desert.
- Fortified Chinese trade bases were established in the Philippines, to gather forest products and distribute imports.

== Gallery ==
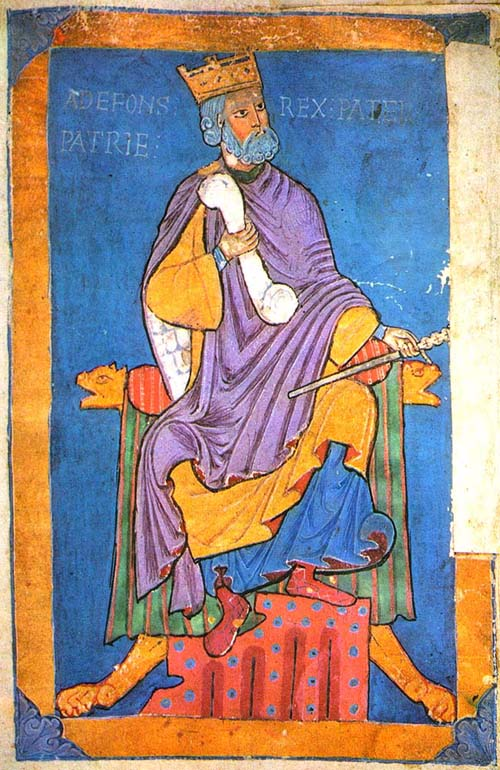
Alfonso VI of Castile

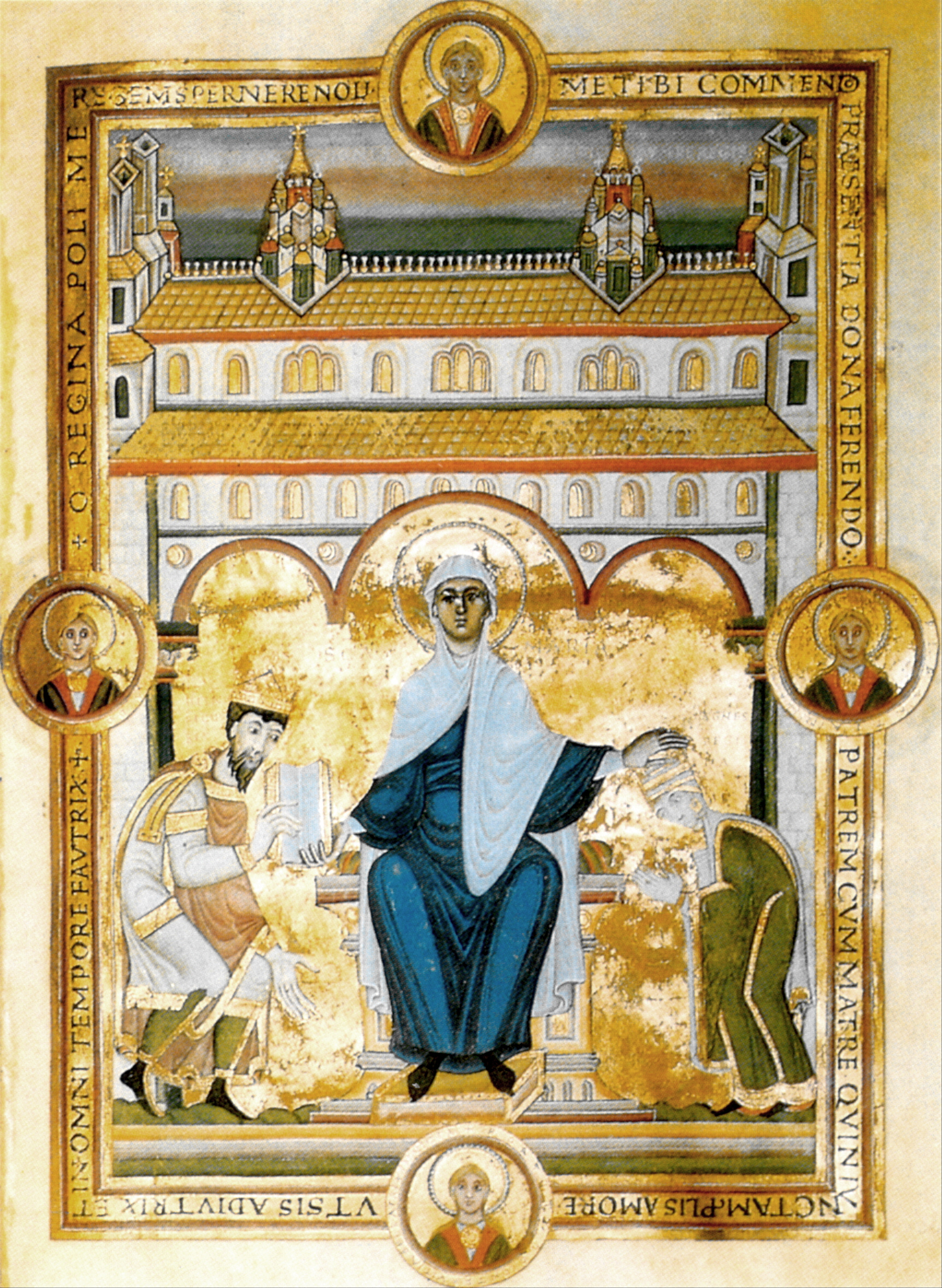
Empress Agnes, German Queen who became regent of the Holy Roman Empire

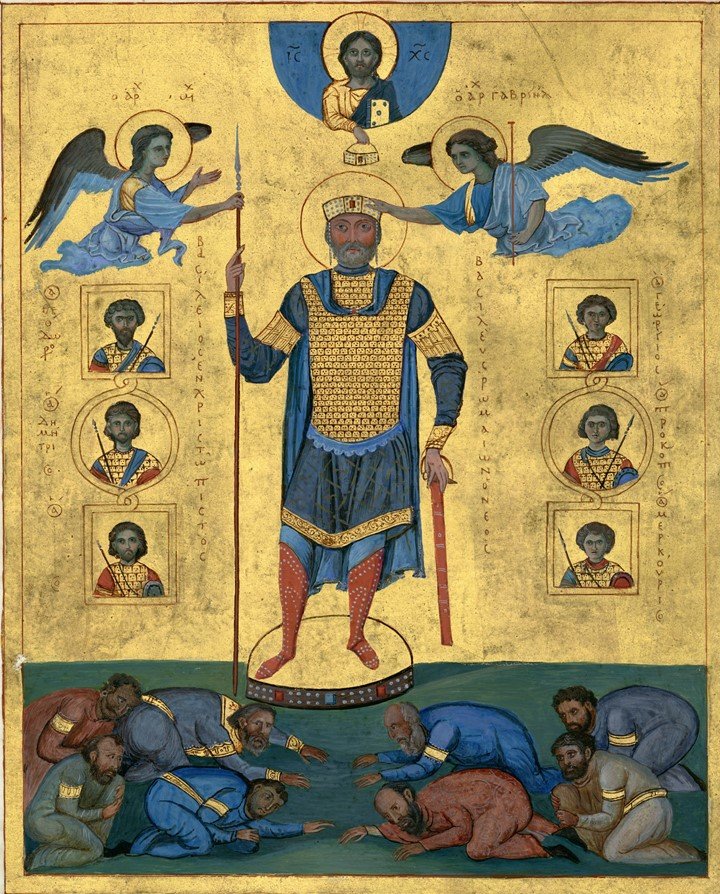
Basil II of the Byzantine Empire.

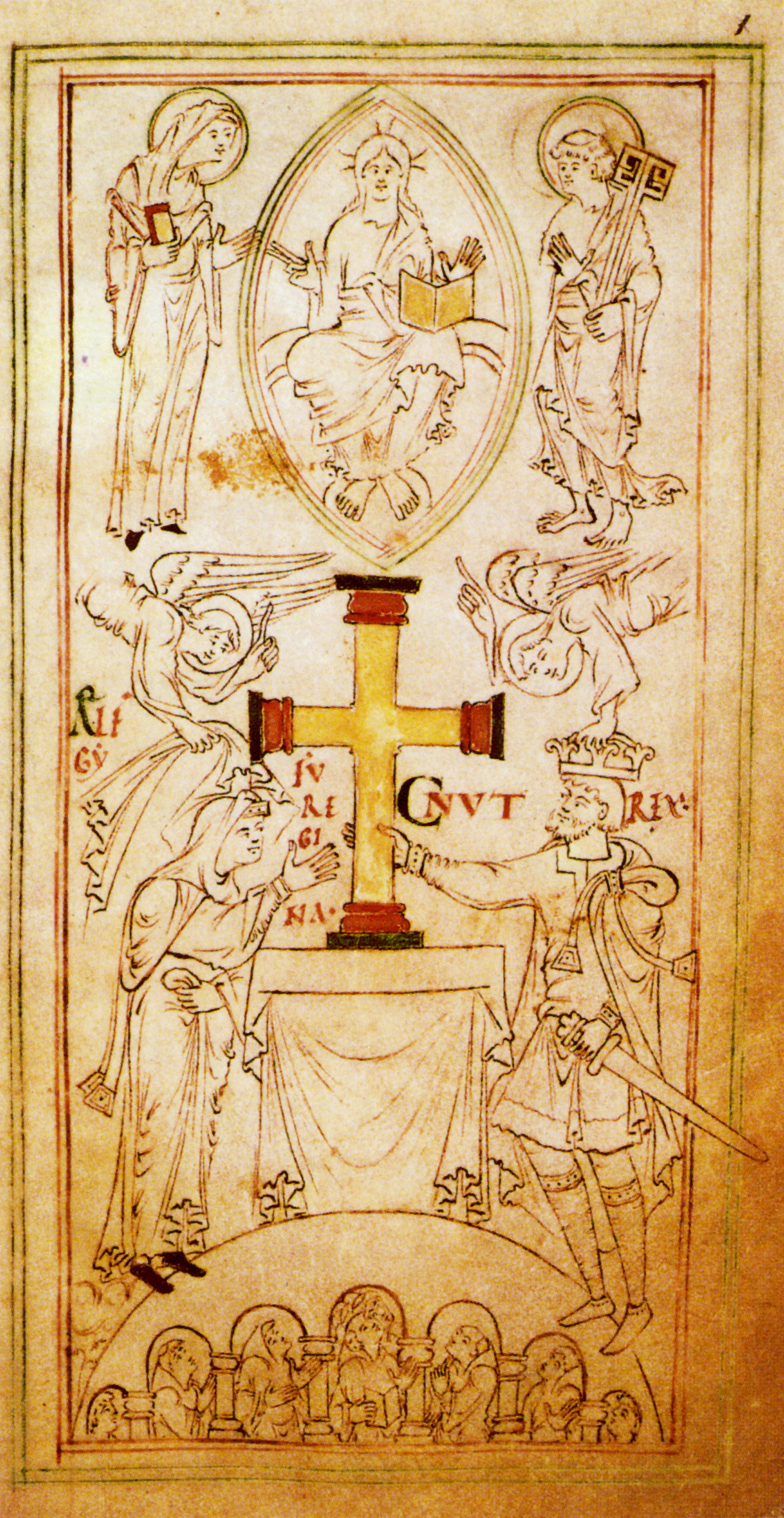
Angels crowning Canute the Great as he and his wife Ælfgifu of Northampton present the Winchester Cross to the church, dated 1031

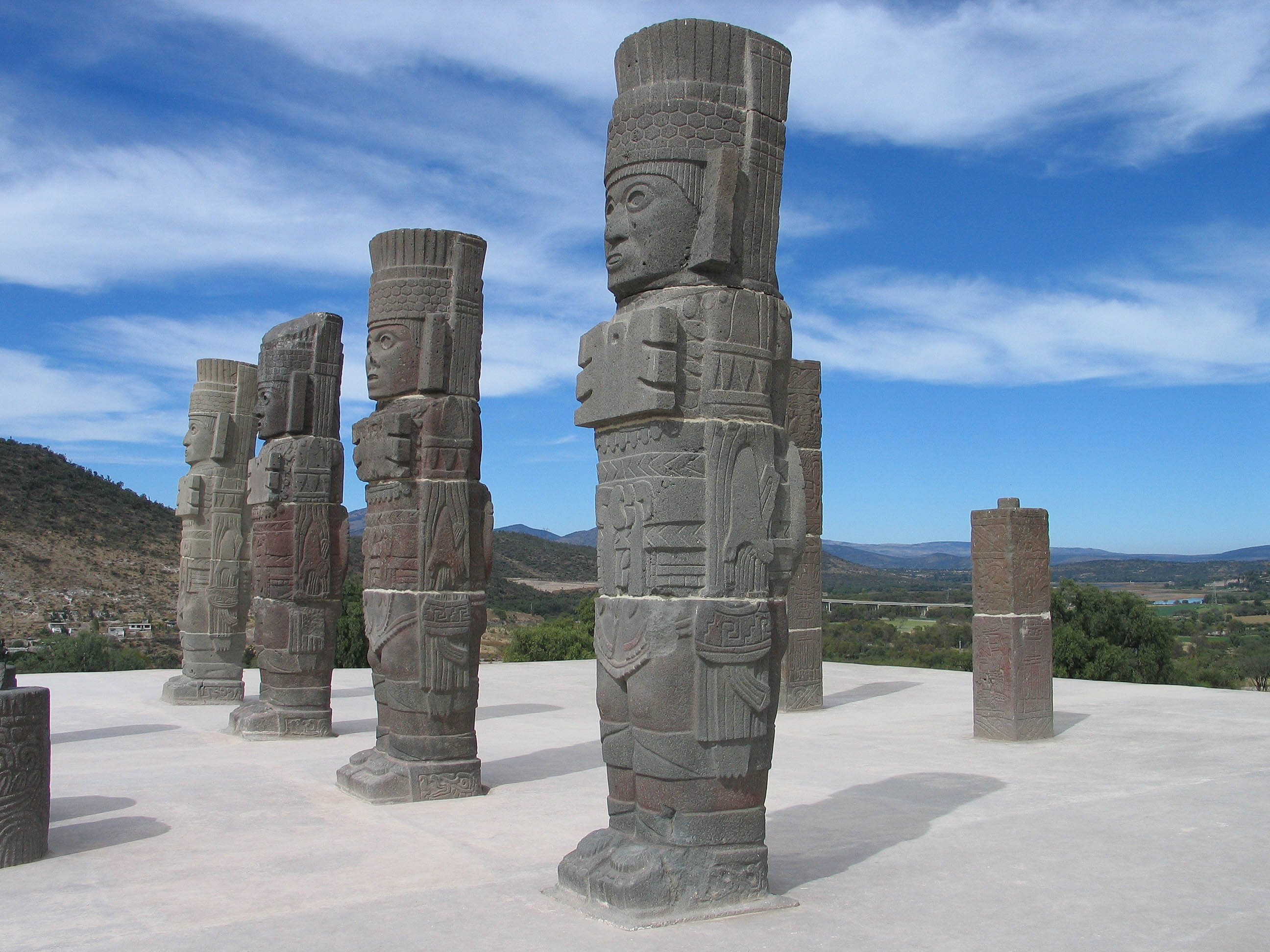
The Atlantes – columns in the form of Toltec warriors in Tula.

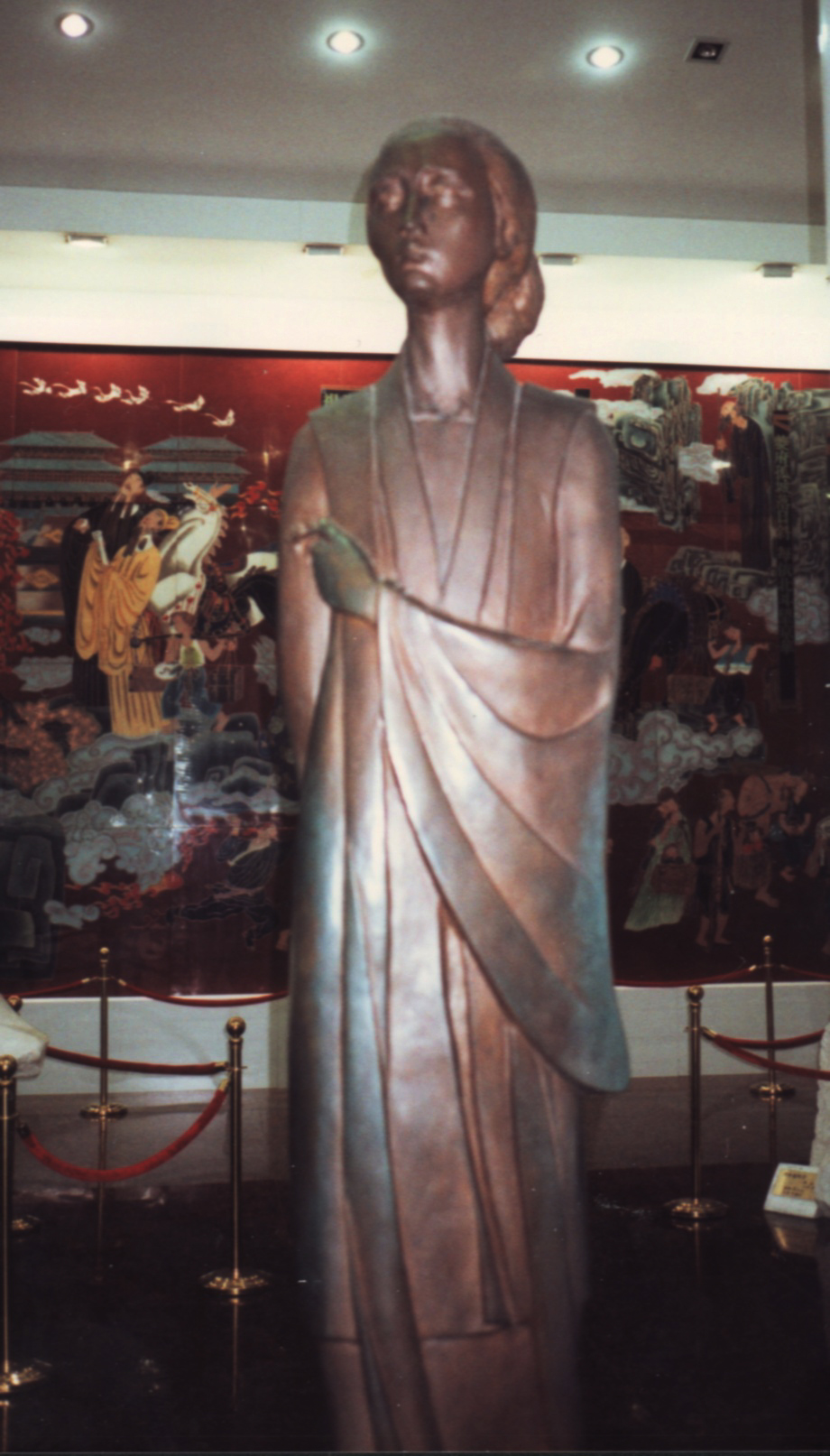
Statue of Lady Li Qingzhao in the Grand Hall of Poets in Du Fu Cao Tang, China

Matilda of Tuscany military leader from Italy

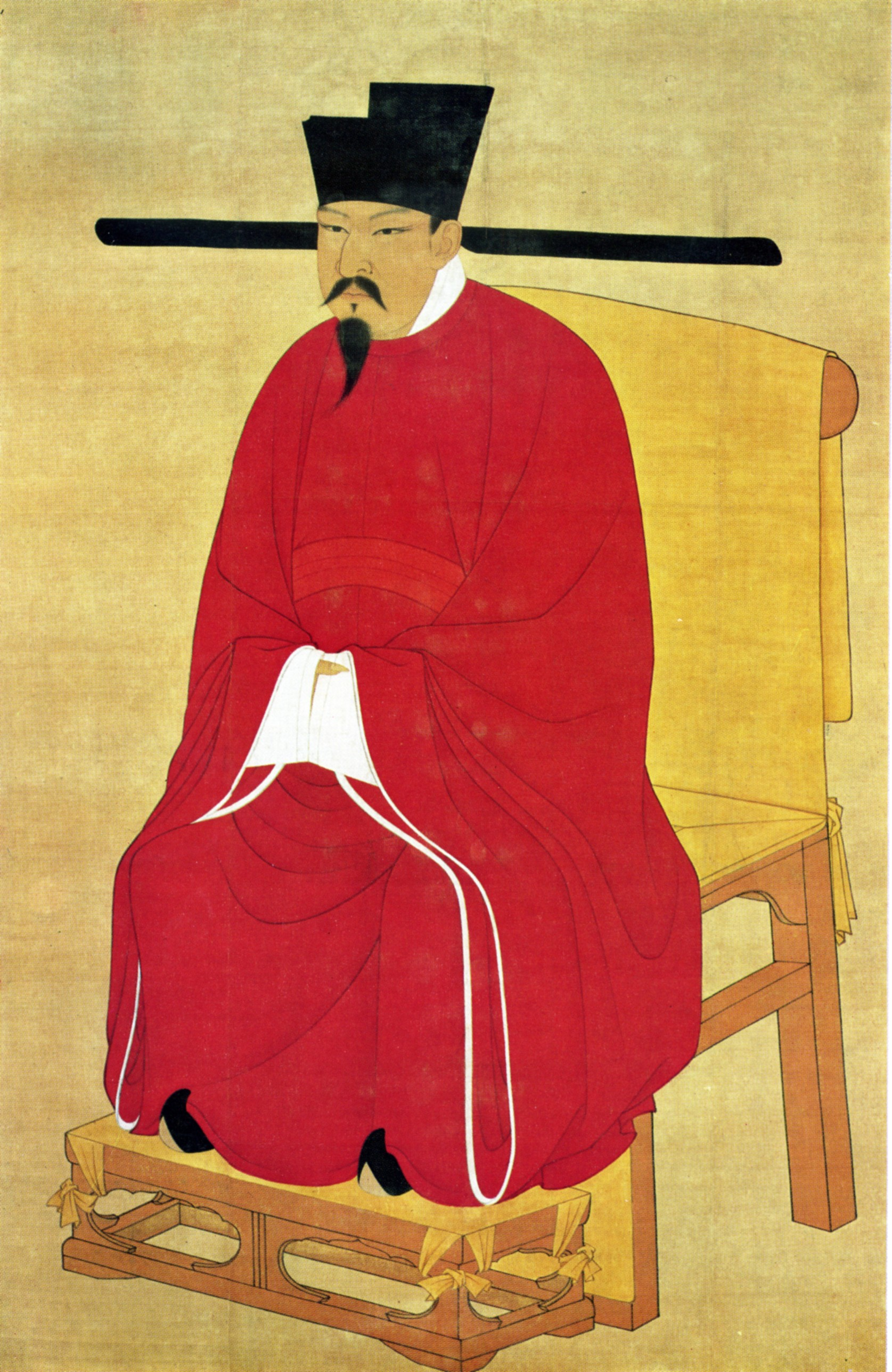
Emperor Shenzong of Song China

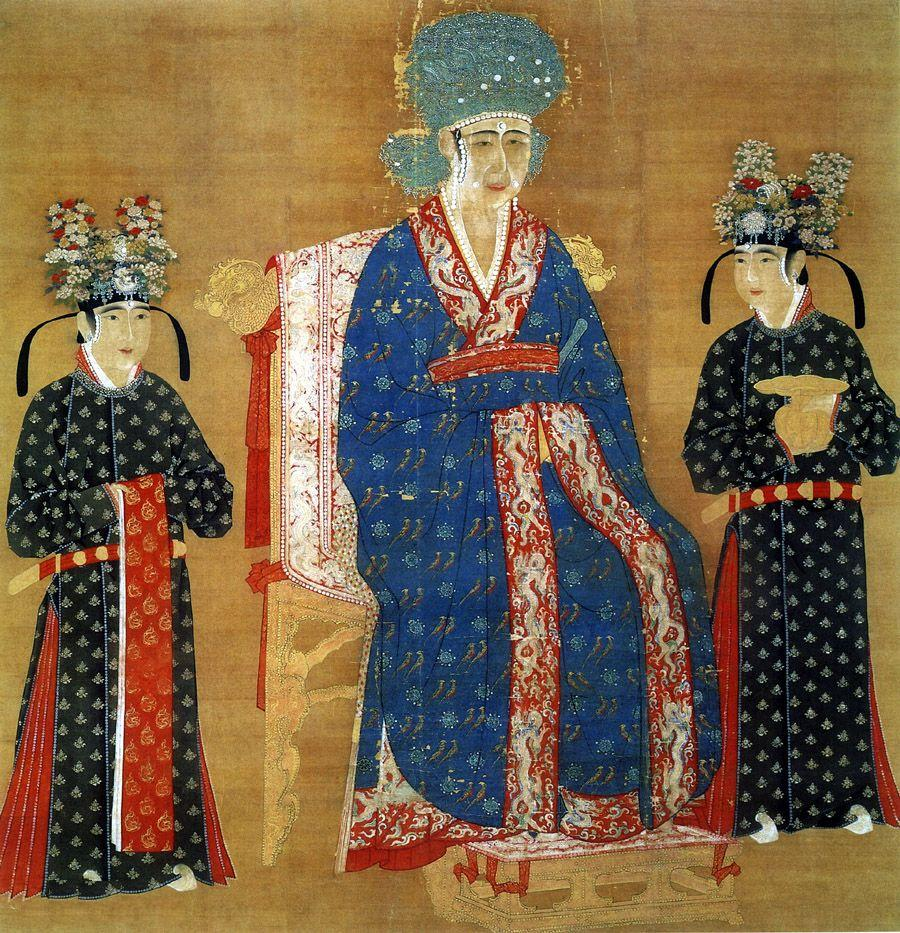
Chinese Empress Cao, wife of Emperor Renzong of Song.

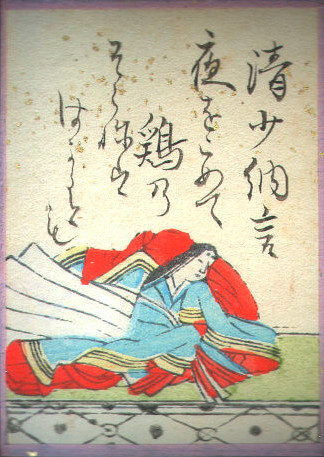
Lady Sei Shōnagon, wrote her Pillow Book about life in the Japanese court

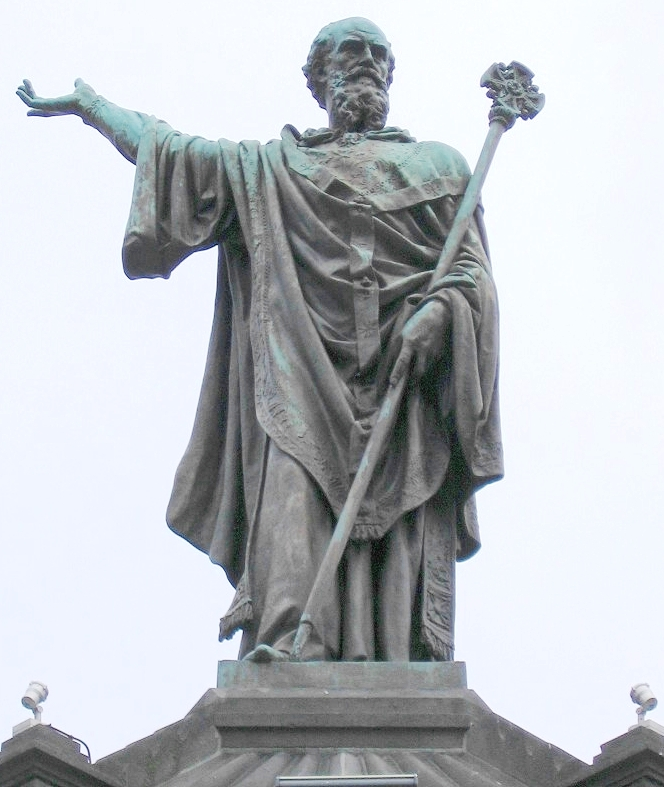
Pope Urban II of Rome

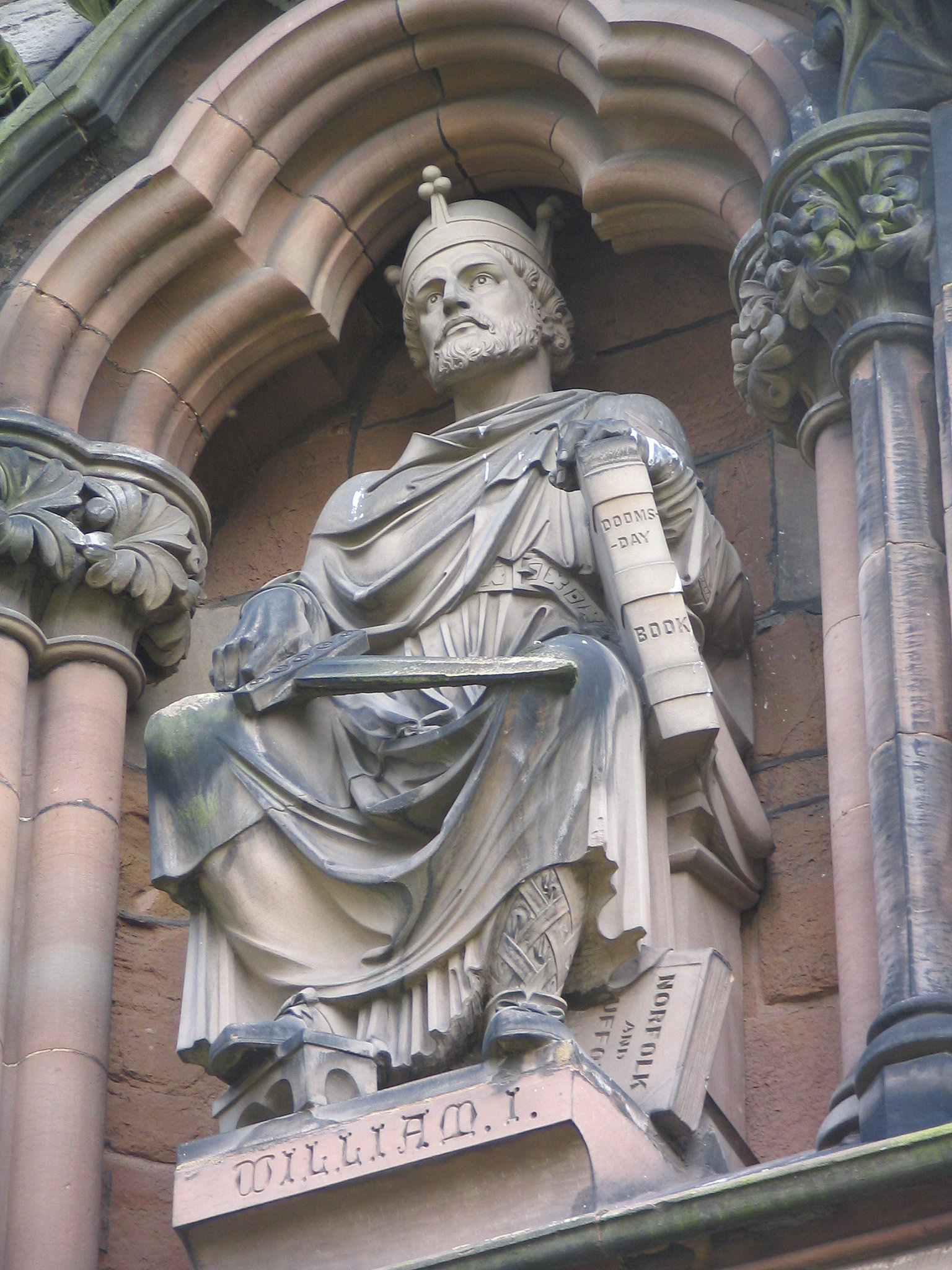
Statue of William the Conqueror, holding Domesday Book on the West Front of Lichfield Cathedral.

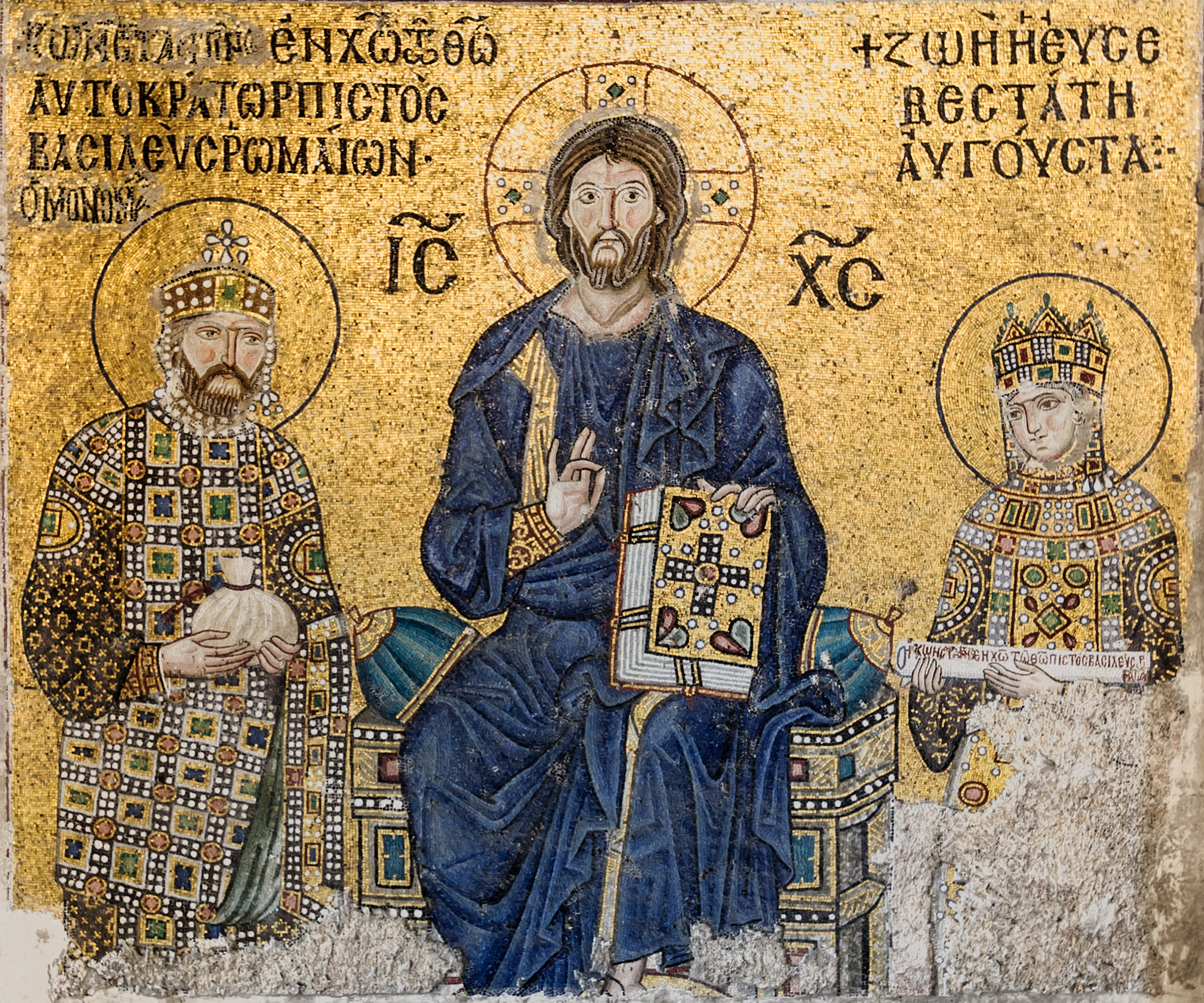
11th century mosaic of Constantine IX Monomachos, Empress Zoe, and Jesus Christ in the Hagia Sophia.

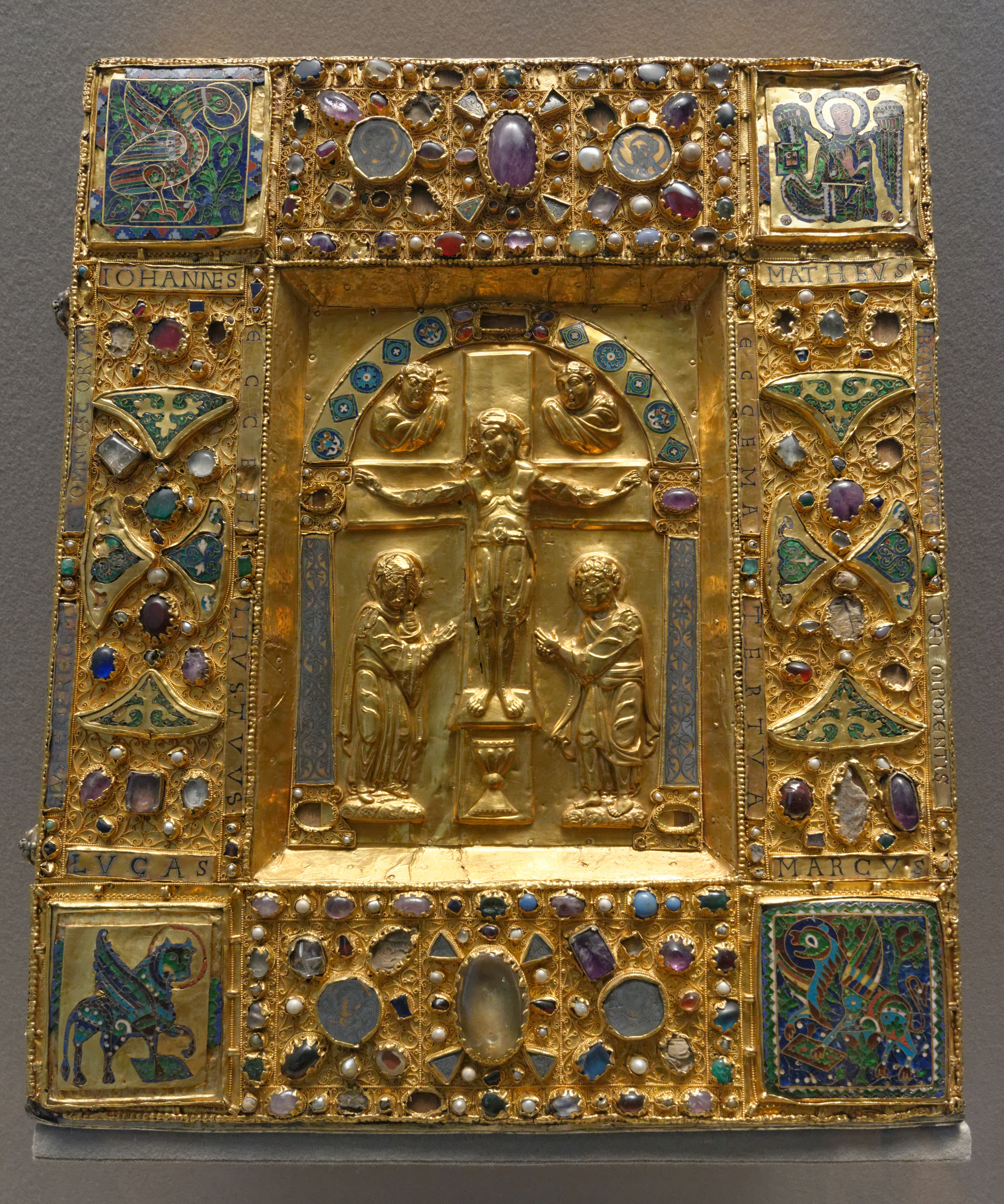
An 11th-century reliquary of gold and cloisonné over wood, from the Duchy of Brabant, Maastricht Cathedral, now housed in the Louvre.

== Architecture ==
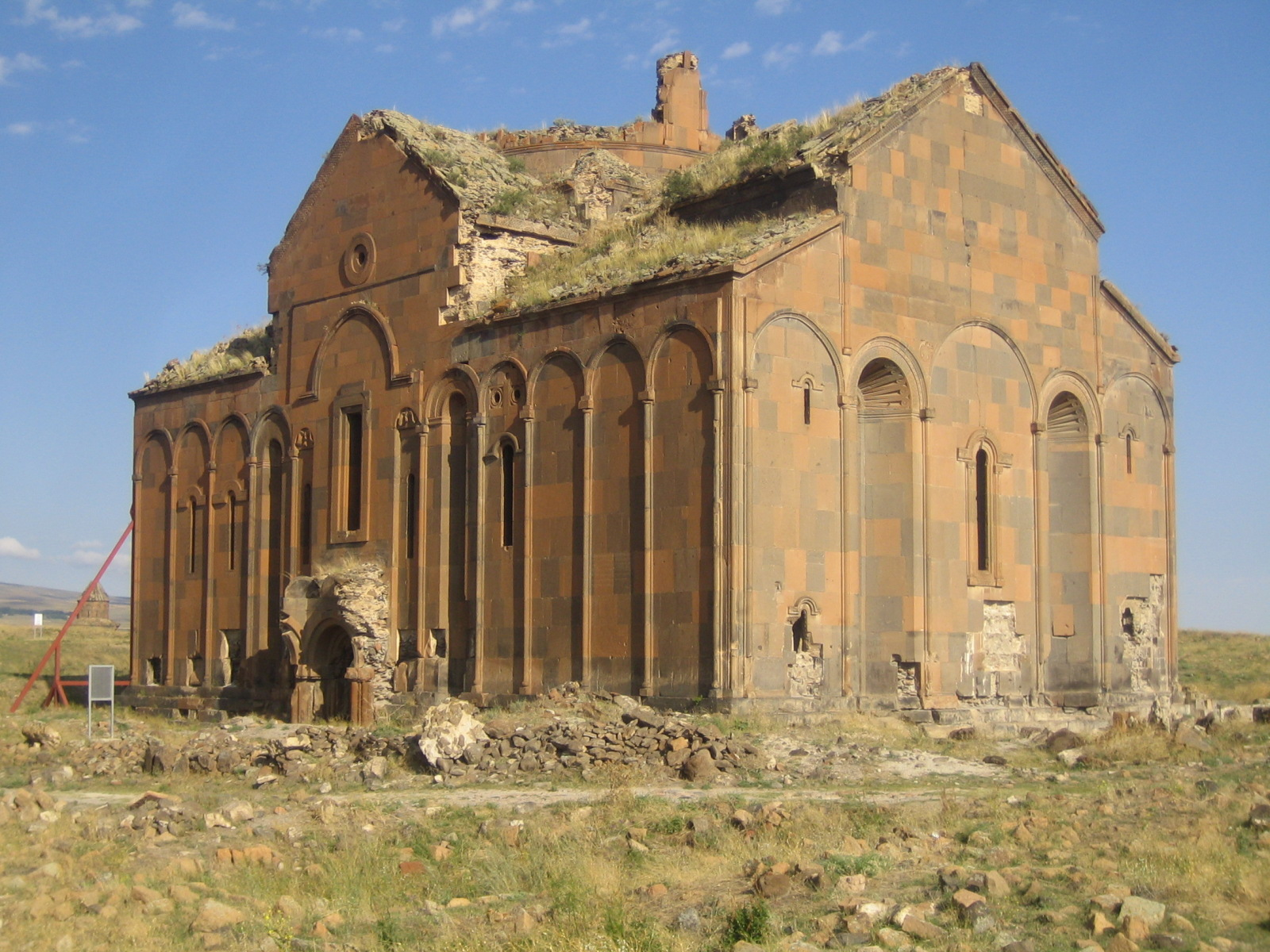
Ani Cathedral in Turkey, completed 1001 or 1010

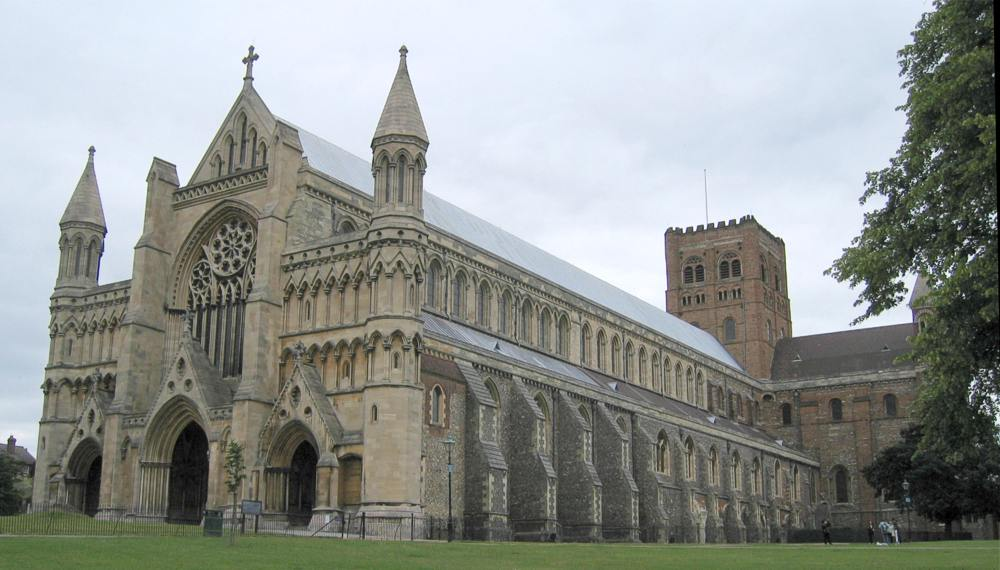
St Albans Cathedral of England, completed in 1089

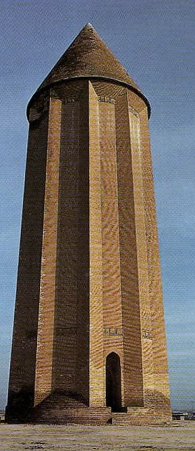
The Gonbad-e Qabus Tower, built in 1006 during the Ziyarid dynasty of Iran

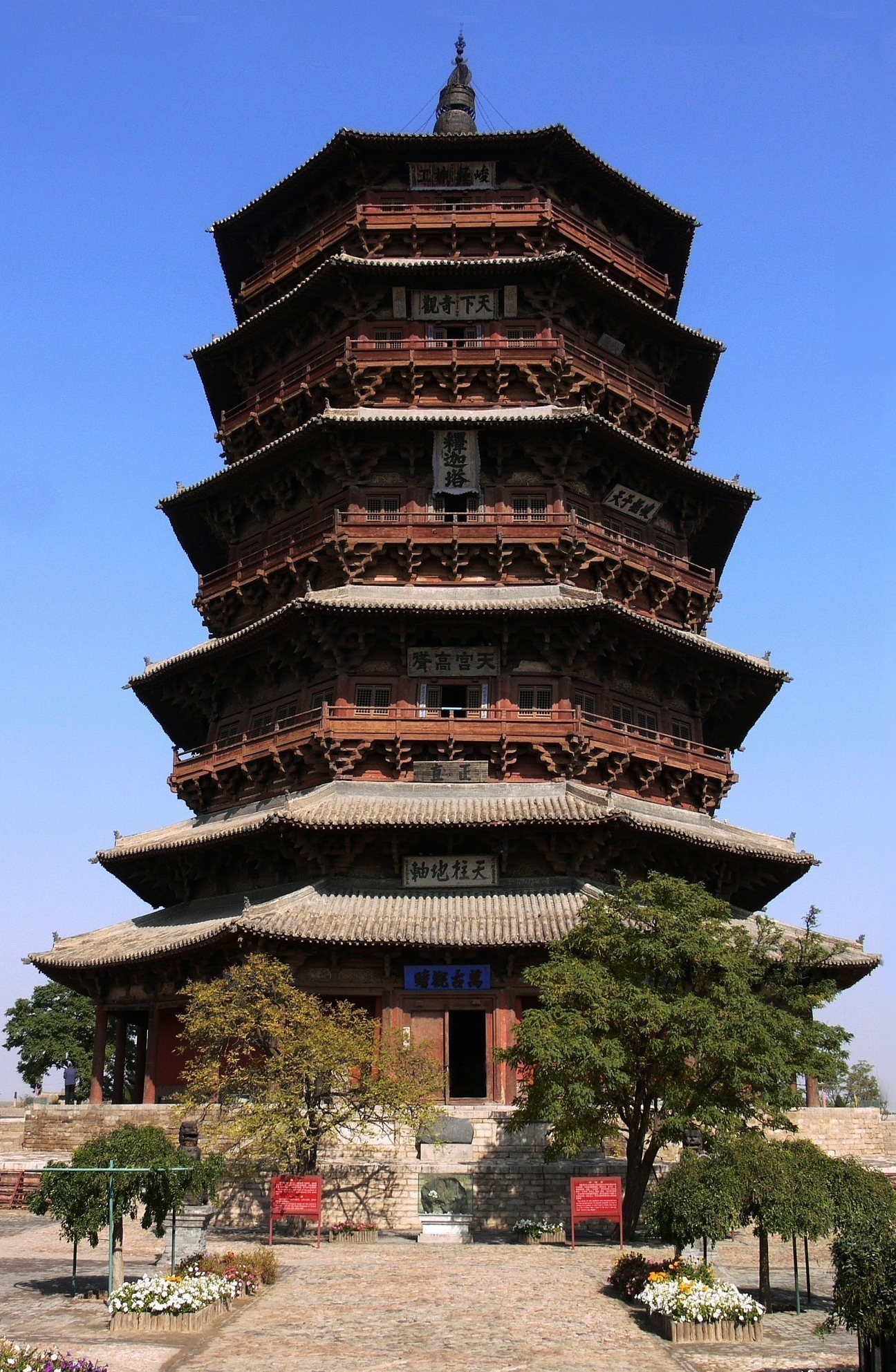
Pagoda of Fogong Temple, built in 1056 in Shanxi, China by the Khitan Liao dynasty in 1056

- Ani Cathedral, Kingdom of Armenia, built 1001 or 1010
- Svetitskhoveli Cathedral, Georgia, is entirely renewed in 1029
- The St Albans Cathedral of Norman-era England is completed in 1089.
- The Al-Hakim Mosque of Fatimid Egypt is completed in 1013.
- The Iron Pagoda of Kaifeng, China is built in 1049.
- The Phoenix Hall of Byōdō-in, Japan, is completed in 1053.
- The Brihadeeswarar Temple of India is completed in 1010 during the reign of Rajaraja Chola I.
- The Fruttuaria of San Benigno Canavese, Italy is completed in 1007.
- The Kedareshwara Temple of Balligavi, India, is built in 1060 by the Western Chalukyas.
- Construction work begins in 1059 on the Parma Cathedral of Italy.
- The Saint Sophia Cathedral in Novgorod is completed in 1052, the oldest existent church in Russia.
- Construction begins on the Saint Sophia Cathedral in Kiev, Kievan Rus, in 1037.
- The Byzantine Greek Hosios Loukas monastery sees the completion of its Katholikon (main church), the earliest extant domed-octagon church from 1011 to 1012.
- The Lingxiao Pagoda of Zhengding, Hebei province, China, is built in 1045.
- The Pagoda of Fogong Temple of Shanxi province, China, is completed under the Liao dynasty in 1056.
- The Nikortsminda Cathedral of Georgia is completed in 1014.
- The Speyer Cathedral in Speyer, Germany is completed in 1061.
- The Chinese official Cai Xiang oversaw the construction of the Wanan Bridge in Fujian.
- The Imam Ali Mosque in Iraq is rebuilt by Malik Shah I in 1086 after it was destroyed by fire.
- The Pizhi Pagoda of Lingyan Temple, Shandong, China is completed in 1063.
- Reconstruction of the San Liberatore a Maiella in Italy begins in 1080.
- Westminster Abbey, London, England, is completed in 1065.
- The Ananda Temple of the Myanmar ruler King Kyanzittha is completed in 1091.
- The Văn Miếu, or Temple of Literature, in Vietnam is established in 1070.
- Construction of Richmond Castle in England begins in 1071.
- The tallest pagoda tower in China's pre-modern history, the Liaodi Pagoda, is completed in 1055, standing at a height of 84 m (275 ft).
- The Tower of Gonbad-e Qabus in Iran is built in 1006.
- Construction begins on the Sassovivo Abbey of Foligno, Italy, in 1070.
- The Palace of Aljafería is built in Zaragoza, Spain, during the Al-Andalus period.
- The Rotonda di San Lorenzo is built in Mantua, Lombardy, Italy, during the late 11th century.
- Construction of the Ponte della Maddalena bridge in the Province of Lucca, Italy begins in 1080.
- The domes of the Jamé Mosque of Isfahan, Iran are built in 1086 to 1087.
- 11th–18th century – The courtyard of Jamé Mosque of Isfahan, Isfahan, Persia (Iran), is built.
- The Chester Castle in England was built in 1069.
- Construction begins on the Bagrati Cathedral in Georgia in 1003.
- The St. Michael's Church, Hildesheim in Germany is completed in 1031.
- The Basilica of Sant'Abbondio of Lombardy, Italy is completed in 1095.
- Construction begins on the Great Zimbabwe National Monument, sometime in the century.
- Construction begins on the San Pietro in Vinculis in Pisa, Italy, in 1072.
- The Tower of London in England is founded in 1078.
- The St. Grigor's Church of Kecharis Monastery in Armenia is built in 1003.
- The Martin-du-Canigou monastery on Mount Canigó in southern France is built in 1009.
- The St. Mary's Cathedral, Hildesheim in Germany is completed in 1020.
- The One Pillar Pagoda in Hanoi, Vietnam, is constructed in 1049.
- The St Michael at the Northgate, Oxford's oldest building, is built in Saxon England in 1040.
- Oxford Castle in England is built in 1071.
- The Florence Baptistry in Florence, Italy is founded in 1059.
- The Kandariya Mahadeva temple in India is built in 1050.
- St Mark's Basilica in Venice, Italy is rebuilt in 1063.
- Canterbury Cathedral in Canterbury, England is completed by 1077.
- Construction begins on the Cathedral of Santiago de Compostela in Spain in 1075.

== Inventions, discoveries, and introductions ==
Latin translation of the Book of Optics (1021), written by the Iraqi physicist, Ibn al-Haytham (Alhazen)

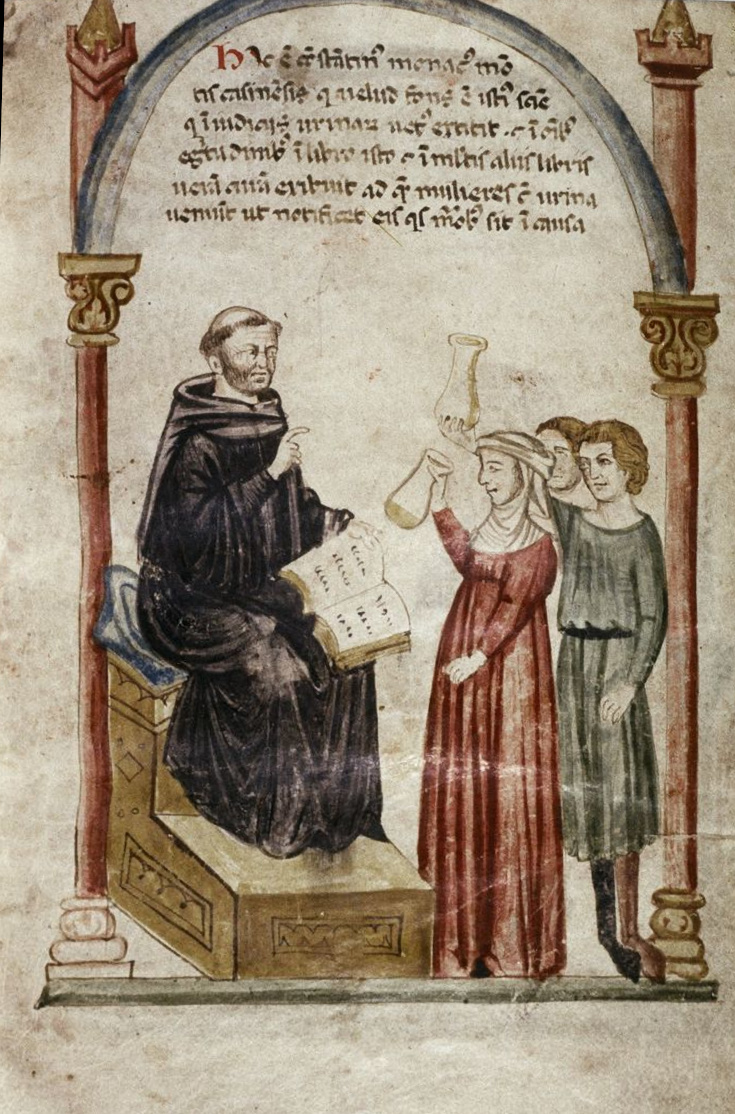
Constantine the African examines patients' urine; he taught ancient Greek medicine and Islamic medicine at the Schola Medica Salernitana.

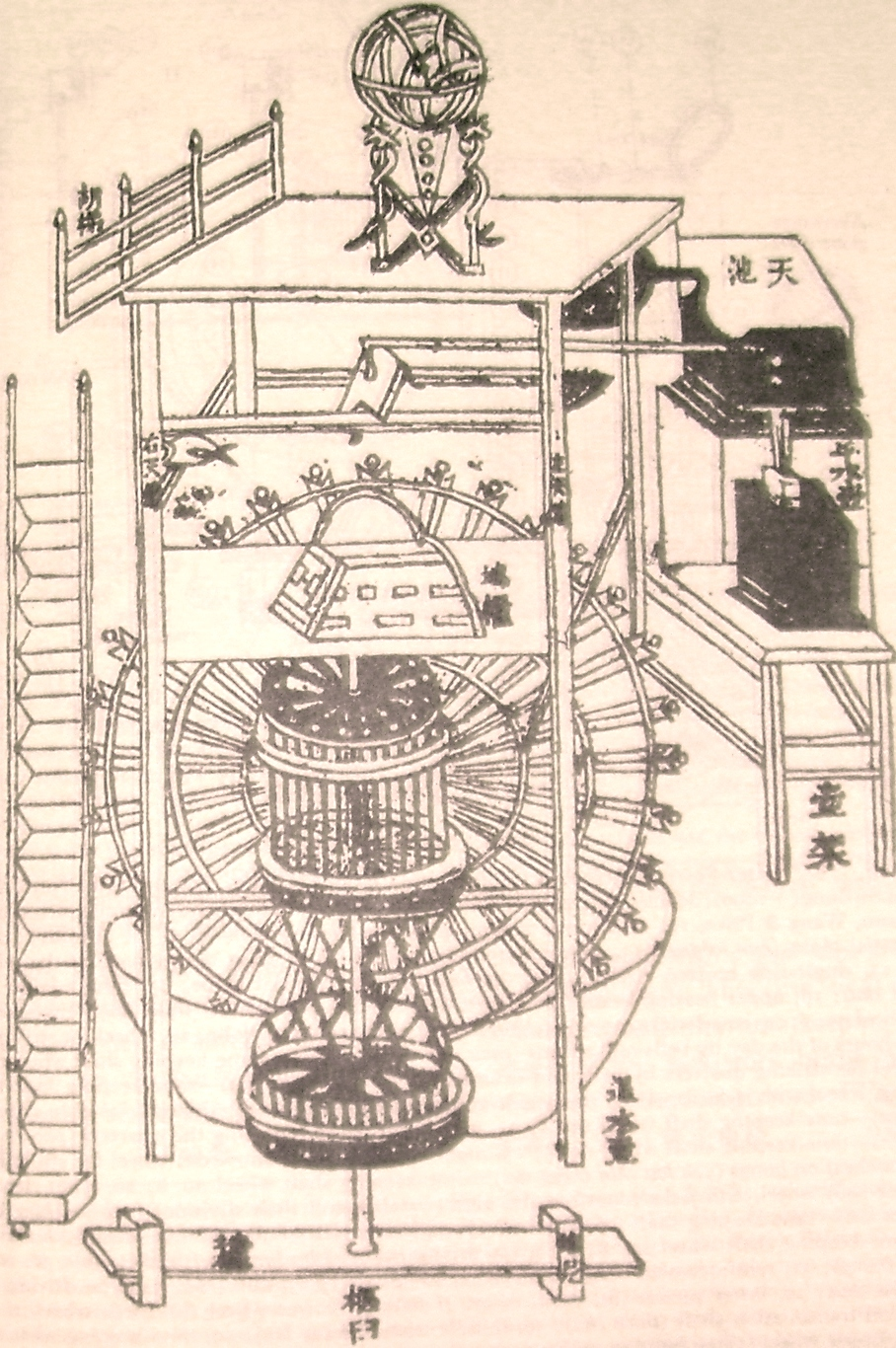
The original diagram of Su Song's book Xin Yi Xiang Fa Yao (published 1092) showing the clepsydra tank, waterwheel, escapement mechanism, chain drive, striking clock jacks, and armillary sphere of his clock tower

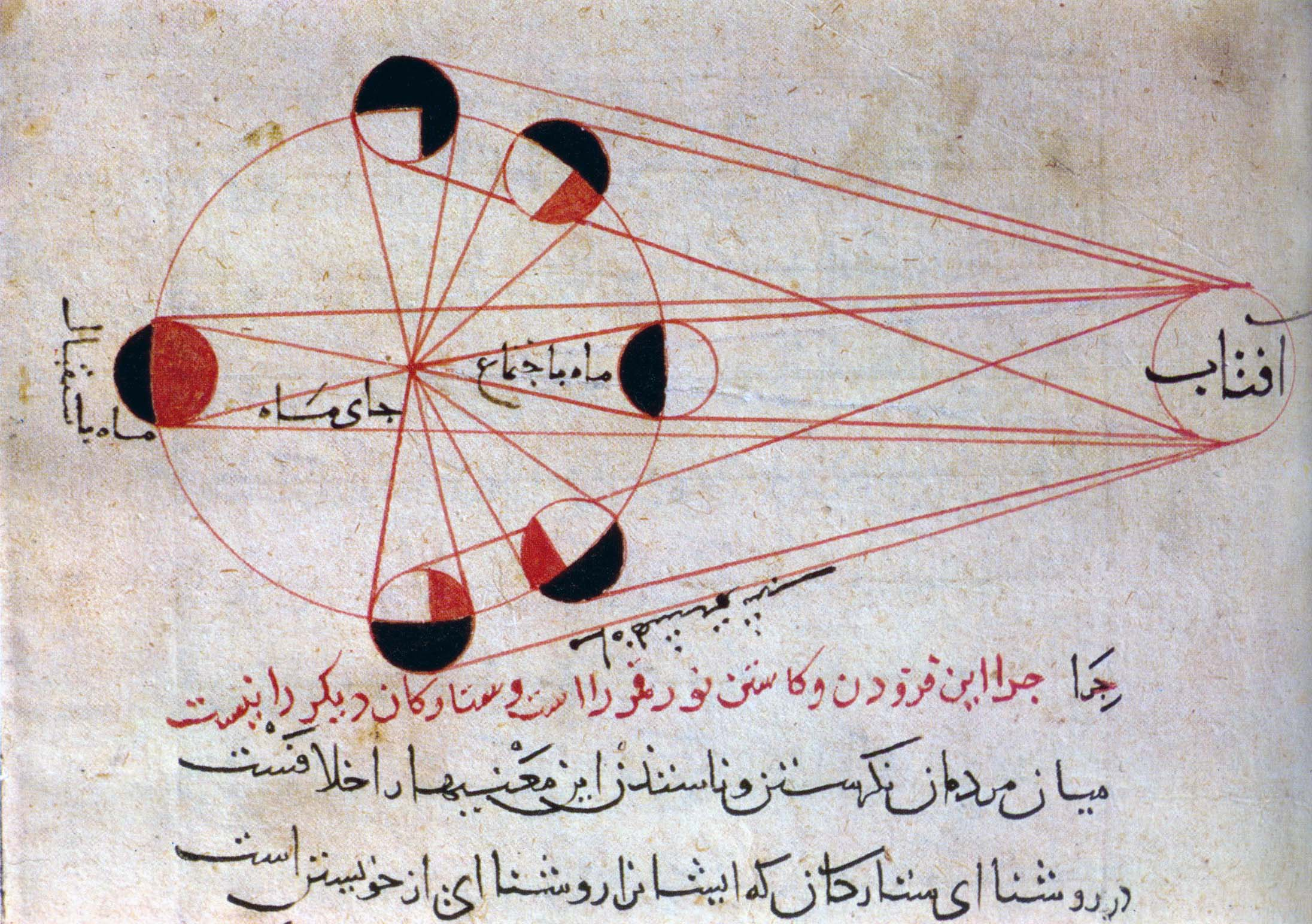
Diagram from al-Bīrūnī's book Kitab al-tafhim showing lunar phases and lunar eclipse

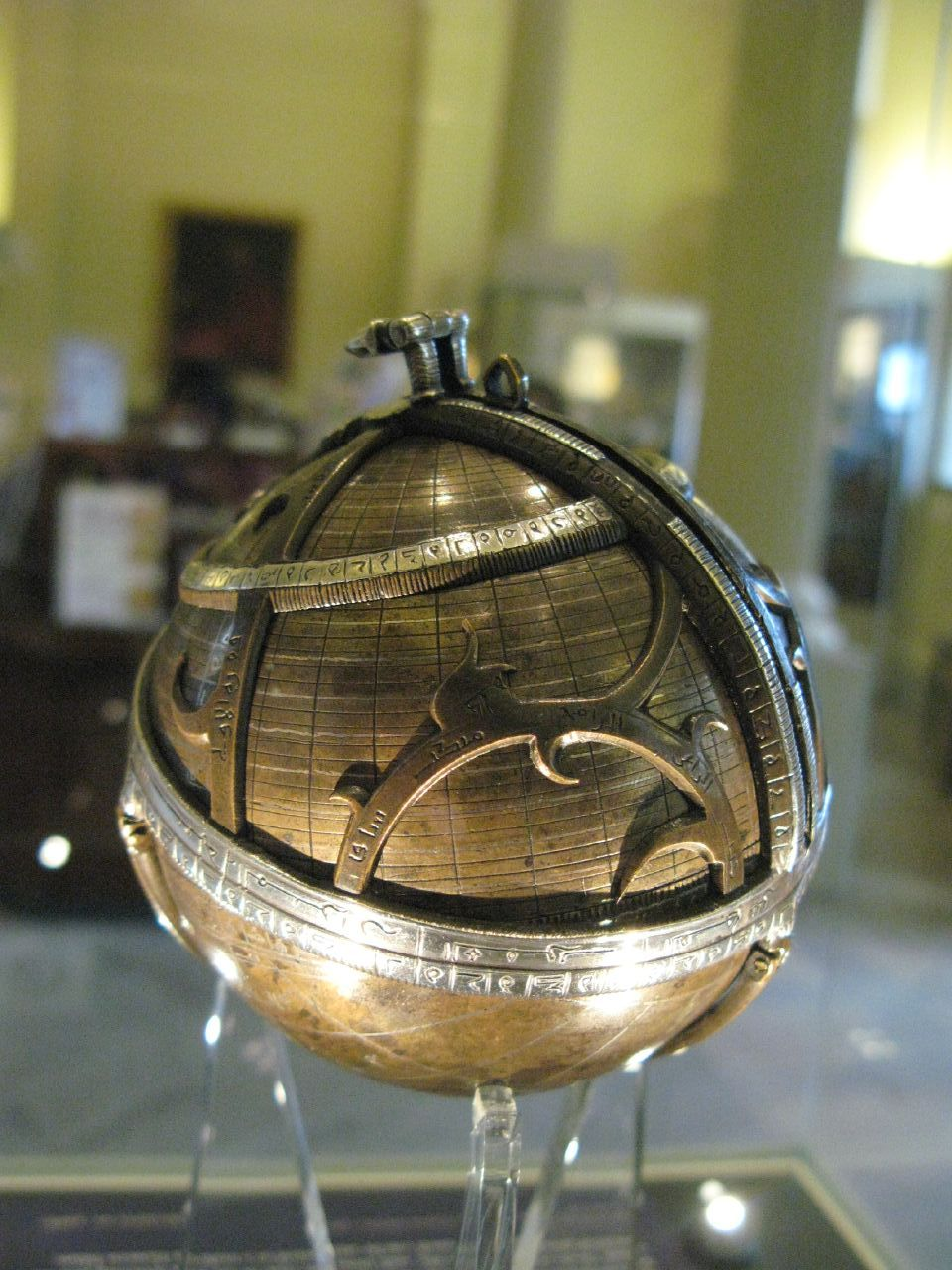
The spherical astrolabe, long employed in medieval Islamic astronomy, was introduced to Europe by Gerbert d'Aurillac, later Pope Sylvester II.

=== Science and technology ===
- Early 11th century – Fan Kuan paints Travelers among Mountains and Streams. Northern Song dynasty. It is now kept at National Palace Museum, Taipei, Taiwan (Republic of China).
- c. 1000 – Abu al-Qasim al-Zahrawi (Abulcasis) of al-Andalus publishes his influential 30-volume Arabic medical encyclopedia, the Al-Tasrif
- c. 1000 – Ibn Yunus of Egypt publishes his astronomical treatise Al-Zij al-Hakimi al-Kabir.
- c. 1000 – Abu Sahl al-Quhi (Kuhi)
- c. 1000 – Abu-Mahmud al-Khujandi
- c. 1000 – Law of sines is discovered by Muslim mathematicians, but it is uncertain who discovers it first between Abu-Mahmud al-Khujandi, Abu Nasr Mansur, and Abu al-Wafa.
- c. 1000 – Ammar ibn Ali al-Mawsili
- 1000–1048 – Abū Rayhān al-Bīrūnī of Persia writes more than a hundred books on many different topics.
- 1001–1100 – the demands of the Chinese iron industry for charcoal led to a huge amount of deforestation, which was curbed when the Chinese discovered how to use bituminous coal in smelting cast iron and steel, thus sparing thousands of acres of prime timberland.
- 1003 – Pope Sylvester II, born Gerbert d'Aurillac, dies; however, his teaching continued to influence those of the 11th century; his works included a book on arithmetic, a study of the Hindu–Arabic numeral system, a hydraulic-powered organ, the reintroduction of the abacus to Europe, and a possible treatise on the astrolabe that was edited by Hermann of Reichenau five decades later. The contemporary monk Richer from Rheims described Gerbert's contributions in reintroducing the armillary sphere that was lost to European science after the Greco-Roman era; from Richer's description, Gerbert's placement of the tropics was nearly exact and his placement of the equator was exact. He reintroduced the liberal arts education system of trivium and quadrivium, which he had borrowed from the educational institution of Islamic Córdoba. Gerbert also studied and taught Islamic medicine.
- 1013 – One of the Four Great Books of Song, the Prime Tortoise of the Record Bureau compiled by 1013 was the largest of the Song Chinese encyclopedias. Divided into 1000 volumes, it consisted of 9.4 million written Chinese characters.
- 1020 – Ibn Samh of Al-Andalus builds a geared mechanical astrolabe.
- 1021 – Ibn al-Haytham (Alhacen) of Basra, Iraq writes his influential Book of Optics from 1011 to 1021 (while he was under house arrest in Egypt),
- 1024 – The world's first paper-printed money can be traced back to the year 1024, in Sichuan province of Song dynasty China. The Chinese government would step in and overtake this trend, issuing the central government's official banknote in the 1120s.
- 1025 – Avicenna of Persia publishes his influential treatise, The Canon of Medicine, which remains the most influential medical text in both Islamic and Christian lands for over six centuries, and The Book of Healing, a scientific encyclopedia.
- 1027 – The Chinese engineer Yan Su recreates the mechanical compass-vehicle of the south-pointing chariot, first invented by Ma Jun in the 3rd century.
- 1028–1087 – Abū Ishāq Ibrāhīm al-Zarqālī (Arzachel) builds the equatorium and universal latitude-independent astrolabe.
- 1031 – Abū Rayhān al-Bīrūnī writes Kitab al-qanun al-Mas'udi
- 1031–1095 – Chinese scientist Shen Kuo creates a theory for land formation, or geomorphology, theorized that climate change occurred over time, discovers the concept of true north, improves the design of the astronomical sighting tube to view the pole star indefinitely, hypothesizes the retrogradation theory of planetary motion, and by observing lunar eclipse and solar eclipse he hypothesized that the sun and moon were spherical. Shen Kuo also experimented with camera obscura just decades after Ibn al-Haitham, although Shen was the first to treat it with quantitative attributes. He also took an interdisciplinary approach to studies in archaeology.
- 1041–1048 – Artisan Bi Sheng of Song dynasty China invents movable type printing using individual ceramic characters.
- Mid-11th century – Harbaville Triptych, is made. It is now kept at Musée du Louvre, Paris.
- Mid-11th century – Xu Daoning paints Fishing in a Mountain Stream. Northern Song dynasty.
- 1068 – First known use of the drydock in China.
- 1070 – With a team of scholars, the Chinese official Su Song also published the Ben Cao Tu Jing in 1070, a treatise on pharmacology, botany, zoology, metallurgy, and mineralogy. Some of the drug concoctions in Su's book included ephedrine, mica minerals, and linaceae.
- 1075 – the Song Chinese innovate a partial decarbonization method of repeated forging of cast iron under a cold blast that Hartwell and Needham consider to be a predecessor to the 18th century Bessemer process.
- 1077 – Constantine the African introduces ancient Greek medicine to the Schola Medica Salernitana in Salerno, Italy.
- c. 1080 – the Liber pantegni, a compendium of Hellenistic and Islamic medicine, is written in Italy by the Carthaginian Christian Constantine the African, paraphrasing translated passages from the Kitab al-malaki of Ali ibn Abbas al-Majusi as well as other Arabic texts.
- 1088 – As written by Shen Kuo in his Dream Pool Essays, the earlier 10th-century invention of the pound lock in China allows large ships to travel along canals without laborious hauling, thus allowing smooth travel of government ships holding cargo of up to 700 tan (49 1/2 tons) and large privately owned-ships holding cargo of up to 1600 tan (113 tons).
- 1094 – The Chinese mechanical engineer and astronomer Su Song incorporates an escapement mechanism and the world's first known chain drive to operate the armillary sphere, the astronomical clock, and the striking clock jacks of his clock tower in Kaifeng.

=== Literature ===
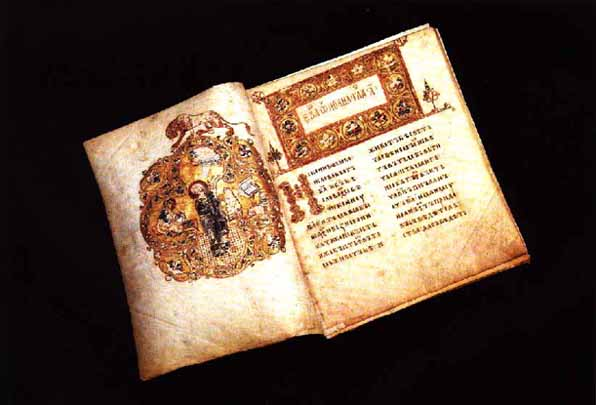
The Ostromir Gospels of Novgorod, 1057

- 1000 – The Remaining Signs of Past Centuries is written by Abū Rayhān al-Bīrūnī.
- c. 1000 – The Al-Tasrif is written by the Andalusian physician and scientist Abu al-Qasim al-Zahrawi (Abulcasis).
- c. 1000 – The Zij al-Kabir al-Hakimi is written by the Egyptian astronomer Ibn Yunus.
- 1002–1003 – Book of Lamentations is written by Gregory of Narek, one of the Doctors of the Church.
- 1000–1037 – Hayy ibn Yaqdhan is written by Ibn Tufail.
- 1008 – The Leningrad Codex, one of the oldest full manuscripts of the Hebrew Bible, is completed.
- c. 1010 – The oldest known copy of the epic poem Beowulf was written around this year.
- 1013 – The Prime Tortoise of the Record Bureau, a Chinese encyclopedia, is completed by a team of scholars including Wang Qinruo.
- 1020 – The Bamberg Apocalypse commissioned by Otto III is completed.
- 1021 – Lady Murasaki Shikibu writes her Japanese novel, The Tale of Genji.
- 1021 – The Book of Optics by Ibn al-Haytham (Alhazen or Alhacen) is completed.
- 1037 – The Jiyun, a Chinese rime dictionary, is published by Ding Du and expanded by later scholars.
- 1037 – Birth of the Chinese poet Su Shi, one of the renowned poets of the Song dynasty, who also penned works of travel literature.
- 1044 – The Wujing Zongyao military manuscript is completed by Chinese scholars Zeng Gongliang, Ding Du, and Yang Weide.
- 1048–1100 – The Rubaiyat of Omar Khayyam is written by Omar Khayyam sometime after 1048.
- 1049 – The Record of Tea is written by Chinese official Cai Xiang
- 1052 – The Uji Dainagon Monogatari, a collection of stories allegedly penned by Minamoto-no-Takakuni, is written sometime between now and 1077.
- 1053 – The New History of the Five Dynasties by Chinese official Ouyang Xiu is completed.
- 1054 – Russian legal code of the Russkaya Pravda is created during the reign of Yaroslav I the Wise.
- 1057 – The Ostromir Gospels of Novgorod are written.
- 1060 – compilation of the New Book of Tang, edited by Chinese official Ouyang Xiu, is complete.
- 1060 – the Mugni Gospels of Armenia are written in illuminated manuscript form.
- 1068 – The Book of Roads and Kingdoms is written by Abū 'Ubayd 'Abd Allāh al-Bakrī.
- 1070 – William I of England commissioned the Norman monk William of Jumièges to extend the Gesta Normannorum Ducum chronicle.
- 1078 – The Proslogion is written by Anselm of Canterbury.
- 1080 – The Chinese poet Su Shi is exiled from court for writing poems criticizing the various reforms of the New Policies Group.
- c. 1080 – the Liber pantegni is written by Constantine the African.
- 1084 – The Zizhi Tongjian history is completed by Chinese official Sima Guang.
- 1086 – The Domesday Book is initiated by William I of England.
- 1088 – The Dream Pool Essays is completed by Shen Kuo of Song China.
- The roots of European Scholasticism are found in this period, as the renewed spark of interest in literature and Classicism in Europe would bring about the Renaissance. In the 11th century, there were early Scholastic figures such as Anselm of Canterbury, Peter Abelard, Solomon ibn Gabirol, Peter Lombard, and Gilbert de la Porrée.
