= Tarchaneiotes =

Byzantine aristocratic family

Tarchaneiotes (Greek: Ταρχανειώτης), feminine form Tarchaneiotissa (Ταρχανειώτισσα), also attested in the variant forms Trachaneiotes, Trachaniates, Tarchoniates, was the name of a Byzantine aristocratic family from Adrianople, active from the late 10th to the 14th century, mostly as military commanders. From the 15th century on some of its members were active in Italy, while a branch of the family migrated to Russia, where their name was russified to Trakhaniot (Траханиот). They are attested until the 17th century.

The origin of the family is unknown. It has been suggested that their name derives from the village of Tarchaneion in Thrace, but alternatives have also been suggested, such a derivation from Mongol targan, "smith", suggested by Gyula Moravcsik, or the Georgian origin ascribed to them by Claude Cahen. No hypothesis can be conclusively proven.

The family first appear with Gregory Tarchaneiotes, catepan of Italy in 998–1006. Other members of the family occupied high military posts in the course of the 11th century. In the conflict between the Anatolian military aristocracy and the Constantinopolitan civil bureaucracy, the Tarchaneiotai sided with the latter. As a result, they were distrusted by the Komnenoi after 1081 and lost in prominence in the 12th century. They regained their position in the Empire of Nicaea, where Nikephoros Tarchaneiotes long served as grand domestic (commander-in-chief of the army). He and his sons became closely connected to the Palaiologos dynasty through ties of marriage.

== Notable members ==
- Gregory Tarchaneiotes, first catepan of Italy in 998–1006
- Basil Tarchaneiotes, stratelates of the West in ca. 1057
- Joseph Tarchaneiotes (died 1074), general who played a dubious role in the Battle of Manzikert, later doux of Antioch
- John Tarchaneiotes, protos of the monastic community of Mount Athos in the early 12th century
- Katakalon Tarchaneiotes, 11th-century Byzantine official
- Nikephoros Tarchaneiotes (died before 1266), grand domestic of the Empire of Nicaea, married to Maria, the sister of Michael VIII Palaiologos (r. 1259–1282)
  - Andronikos Tarchaneiotes, son of Nikephoros, megas konostaulos
  - John Tarchaneiotes, son of Nikephoros, leader of the Arsenites and general
  - Michael Tarchaneiotes (died 1284), son of Nikephoros, grand domestic from 1278 until his death, defeated the Angevins at Berat
- Michael Doukas Glabas Tarchaneiotes (ca. 1235 – after 1304), protostrator and one of the most distinguished Byzantine generals of the late 13th century
  - Tarchaneiotissa, whose first name is not known, spouse of Andronikos Asen, daughter of Glabas and his wife Maria Doukaina Komnene Palaiologina Branaina and great-great-grandmother of Byzantine emperors John VIII Palaiologos and Constantine XI Palaiologos
- Constantine Tarchaneiotes, admiral in 1352
- Michael Tarchaniota Marullus (c. 1458–1500), Renaissance scholar in Italy
- Yuri Trakhaniot, Muscovite ambassador to Milan in 1486

== Sources ==
- Kazhdan, Alexander, ed. (1991). The Oxford Dictionary of Byzantium. Oxford and New York: Oxford University Press. pp. 2011–2012. ISBN 0-19-504652-8.
- Vougiouklaki, Penelope (2003). "Tarchaneiotes family". Encyclopedia of the Hellenic World, Asia Minor. Foundation of the Hellenic World.
