= Alexios Xiphias =

Catepan of Italy

Alexios Xiphias (Greek: Ἀλέξιος Ξιφίας, Latin: Alexius Xifea) was a Byzantine protospatharios and catepan of Italy from 1006 to 1007, following the long term of office of Gregory Tarchaneiotes. In March 1007, he promulgated a diploma in favour of Alexander, abbot of San Giovanni in Lamis.

He arrived at Bari in July 1006. He died sometime between April and August of 1007. His successor, John Kourkouas, did not arrive in Bari until May 1008.

== Sources ==
- Lilie, Ralph-Johannes; Ludwig, Claudia; Pratsch, Thomas; Zielke, Beate (2013). Prosopographie der mittelbyzantinischen Zeit Online. Berlin-Brandenburgische Akademie der Wissenschaften. Nach Vorarbeiten F. Winkelmanns erstellt (in German). Berlin and Boston: De Gruyter.

Preceded by Gregory Tarchaneiotes	Catepan of Italy; 1006–1007	Succeeded by John Kourkouas
