= John Kourkouas (catepan) =

John Kourkouas or Curcuas (Greek: Ἰωάννης Κουρκούας) was the Byzantine catepan of Italy from 1008 to 1010.

John belonging to the Kourkouas family of Armenian descent. According to a deed of grant to the monastery of San Giovanni in Lamis, he bore the titles of anthypatos and patrikios. Kourkouas arrived at Bari in May 1008, as a replacement for Alexios Xiphias, who had died sometime between April and August of the previous year. He served as catepan of Italy until some time before March 1010, when his successor, Basil Mesardonites, is attested in office. According to the Italian chronicles of Lupus Protospatharius and Anonymus Barensis, he died in office in 1010.

Nothing is known of his tenure, as the only information about him comes from deeds confirmed by his successors, and brief references in Italian sources. John's government coincided with the first revolt of the Lombards in Greek Apulia, under Melus of Bari.

A possible descendant or relative, the notary John Kourkouas, is attested in southern Italy some time before 1054.

== Sources ==
- Andriollo, Lisa (2012), "Les Kourkouas (IXe-XIe siècle)", in Cheynet, Jean-Claude; Sode, Claudia (eds.), Studies in Byzantine Sigillography (in French), vol. 11, Berlin: De Gruyter, pp. 57–88, ISBN 978-3-11-026668-9
- Lilie, Ralph-Johannes; Ludwig, Claudia; Pratsch, Thomas; Zielke, Beate (2013). Prosopographie der mittelbyzantinischen Zeit Online. Berlin-Brandenburgische Akademie der Wissenschaften. Nach Vorarbeiten F. Winkelmanns erstellt (in German). Berlin and Boston: De Gruyter.

Preceded by Alexios Xiphias	Catepan of Italy; 1008–1010	Succeeded by Basil Mesardonites
