= Gregory Tarchaneiotes =

Byzantine general

Gregory Tarchaneiotes or Trachan[e]iotes (Greek: Γρηγόριος Ταρχανειώτης/Τραχαν[ε]ιώτης, in Latin sources Trachaniota and Trachamoti) was an imperial protospatharios and the long-reigning catepan of Italy from 998 to 1006.

He assumed his office sometime after 1 September 998, in succession to John Ammiropoulos. Soon after, still in the same year, he confirmed the grant of a village to the abbot of Santa Maria del Rifugio in Tricarico. In the first year of his tenure, he captured the town of Gravina, which had risen in revolt, and took its leader, a certain Theophylact, prisoner.

In December 999, and again on February 2, 1002, he reinstituted and confirmed the possessions of the abbey and monks of Monte Cassino in Ascoli. In 1004, he fortified and expanded the castle of Dragonara on the Fortore. He gave it three circular towers and one square one. He also strengthened Lucera.

== Sources ==
- Lilie, Ralph-Johannes; Ludwig, Claudia; Pratsch, Thomas; Zielke, Beate (2013). Prosopographie der mittelbyzantinischen Zeit Online. Berlin-Brandenburgische Akademie der Wissenschaften. Nach Vorarbeiten F. Winkelmanns erstellt (in German). Berlin and Boston: De Gruyter.

Preceded by John Ammiropoulos	Catepan of Italy; 998–1006	Succeeded by Alexios Xiphias
