= 1041 =

Calendar year

1041 in various calendars
- Gregorian calendar: 1041; MXLI
- Ab urbe condita: 1794
- Armenian calendar: 490; ԹՎ ՆՂ
- Assyrian calendar: 5791
- Balinese saka calendar: 962–963
- Bengali calendar: 447–448
- Berber calendar: 1991
- English Regnal year: N/A
- Buddhist calendar: 1585
- Burmese calendar: 403
- Byzantine calendar: 6549–6550
- Chinese calendar: 庚辰年 (Metal Dragon); 3738 or 3531 — to — 辛巳年 (Metal Snake); 3739 or 3532
- Coptic calendar: 757–758
- Discordian calendar: 2207
- Ethiopian calendar: 1033–1034
- Hebrew calendar: 4801–4802
- Hindu calendars
- Vikram Samvat: 1097–1098
- Shaka Samvat: 962–963
- Kali Yuga: 4141–4142
- Holocene calendar: 11041
- Igbo calendar: 41–42
- Iranian calendar: 419–420
- Islamic calendar: 432–433
- Japanese calendar: Chōkyū 2 (長久２年)
- Javanese calendar: 944–945
- Julian calendar: 1041; MXLI
- Korean calendar: 3374
- Minguo calendar: 871 before ROC 民前871年
- Nanakshahi calendar: −427
- Seleucid era: 1352/1353 AG
- Thai solar calendar: 1583–1584
- Tibetan calendar: ལྕགས་ཕོ་འབྲུག་ལོ་ (male Iron-Dragon); 1167 or 786 or 14 — to — ལྕགས་མོ་སྦྲུལ་ལོ་ (female Iron-Snake); 1168 or 787 or 15

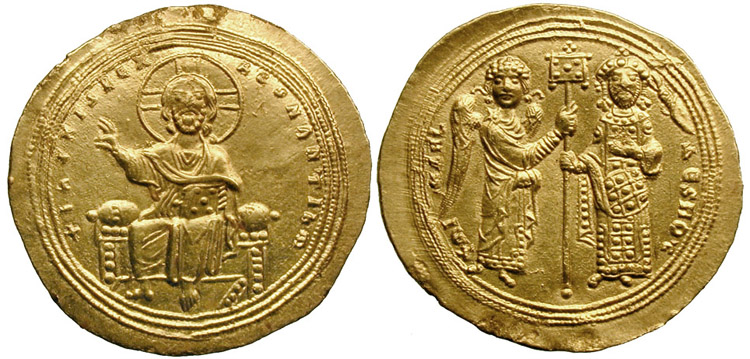
Michael V Kalaphates (c. 1015–1042)

Year 1041 (MXLI) was a common year starting on Thursday of the Julian calendar.

== Events ==
=== By place ===
==== Byzantine Empire ====
- December 10 – Emperor Michael IV the Paphlagonian dies after a 6-year reign. His wife, Empress Zoë, elevates (on the advice of her lover John the Orphanotrophos) her adoptive son to the throne of the Byzantine Empire, as Michael V Kalaphates. Shortly after, Michael comes into conflict with his uncle John, and banishes him to a monastery.

==== Europe ====
- March 17 – Battle of Olivento: Norman troops and their Lombard allies, led by William Iron Arm, are victorious against the Byzantines at the feet of the Monte Vulture, near the River Olivento in Apulia.
- May 4 – Battle of Montemaggiore: Lombard-Norman rebel forces, led by William, are again victorious, and defeat a Byzantine army (18,000 men) on the hill of Montemaggiore, near the River Ofanto.
- September 3 – Battle of Montepeloso: Lombard-Norman rebel forces, led by William, defeat the Byzantines at Montepeloso. During the battle, Boioannes, governor of the Catepanate of Italy, is captured.
- September – Peter, King of Hungary is deposed by a palace coup. The Hungarian magnates elect Samuel Aba as their king.
- Winter – Battle of Ostrovo: The Byzantines, with the help of the Varangian Guard, led by Harald Hardrada (future king of Norway), defeat the Bulgarian troops, near Lake Ostrovo in Greece.

==== England ====
- King Harthacnut invites his half-brother Edward the Confessor to return to England from exile in Normandy as his heir as king of England, with the support of Godwin, Earl of Wessex.
- The city of Worcester rebels against the naval taxes of Harthacnut. He reduces the navy from 60 to 32 ships.

==== Africa ====
- The Zirid dynasty rejects Shi'ite obedience and Fatimid domination, and recognizes the Abbasids as their overlords.

==== Asia ====
- At about this time, the number of enlisted soldiers in the Song dynasty Chinese military reaches well over 1,250,000 troops, an increase since 1022, when there were a million soldiers.

== Births ==
- Ōe no Masafusa, Japanese poet (d. 1111)
- Raymond IV of Toulouse (Raymond of Saint-Gilles), French nobleman (d. 1105) (approximate date)

== Deaths ==
- February 4 – Fujiwara no Kintō, Japanese poet (b. 966)
- September – Budo, Hungarian courtier
- December 10 – Michael IV the Paphlagonian, Byzantine emperor (b. 1010)
- Adolf II of Lotharingia, German nobleman (b. 1002)
- Akazome Emon, Japanese waka poet (approximate date)
- Eadwulf IV of Bamburgh, Northumbrian ruler
- Edmund of Durham (or Eadmund), English bishop
- Gangeyadeva, Indian ruler of the Kalachuris of Tripuri
- Mac Beathaidh mac Ainmire, Irish poet and Chief Ollam
- Muhammad of Ghazni, sultan of the Ghaznavids (b. 998)
- Muhammad ibn Rustam Dushmanziyar, Buyid emir
- Peter Delyan, Bulgarian rebel leader and ruler (tsar)
- Sampiro, Spanish bishop, politician and intellectual
- Tancred of Hauteville, Norman nobleman (b. 980)
- Vikramabahu, Prince of Ruhuna (or Kassapa), ruler of Sri Lanka (b. 1017)
