= Italy runestones =

Clickable map of the geographic distribution of the Italy Runestones in southern Sweden (modern administrative borders and cities are shown)

The Italy runestones are three or four Varangian runestones from 11th-century Sweden that tell of warriors who died in Langbarðaland ("Land of the Lombards"), the Old Norse name for south Italy. On these rune stones it is southern Italy that is referred to (Langobardia), but the Rundata project renders it rather anachronistically as Lombardy (see the translations of the individual stones, below).

The rune stones are engraved in Old Norse with the Younger Futhark, and two of them are found in Uppland and one or two in Södermanland.

The memorials are probably raised in memory of members of the Varangian Guard, the elite guard of the Byzantine Emperor, and they probably died while fighting in southern Italy against the local Lombard principalities or the invading Normans. Many of their brothers-in-arms are remembered on the 28 Greece runestones most of which are found in the same part of Sweden.

The young men who applied for a position in the Varangian guard were not uncouth roughnecks, as in the traditional stereotype, but instead, it appears that they were usually fit and well-raised young warriors who were skilled in weapons. They were the kind of warriors who were welcome as the elite troops of the Byzantine Emperor, and whom the rulers of Kievan Rus' requested from Scandinavia when they were under threat.

== Interpretations ==
The 10th century Longobardia region in southern Italy, before the creation of the Catepanate; The Battles of Olivento, Montemaggiore and Montepeloso were all fought in the region of Longobardia

Johan Peringskiöld (d. 1720) considered the Fittja stone and the Djulefors stone to refer to the Lombard migration from Sweden, whereas Celsius (1727) interpreted them in a strikingly different manner. He noted that the name Longobardia was not applied to Italy until after the destruction of the Kingdom of the Lombards in 774. He claimed that the kingdom had been taken over by Varangians from Byzantium in the 11th and 12th centuries, and noted that in Barbarossa's campaign in Italy there were many Scandinavian warriors. The stones would have commemorated Swedish warriors who died in Barbarossa's war. This view was also espoused by Brocman (1762) who considered Holmi to have died in the 12th century for either the Byzantine Emperor or ruler of the Holy Roman Empire.

Von Friesen (1913) noted that it is not Lombardy in northern Italy that is intended but Langobardia in southern Italy, which was ruled by the Byzantine Emperor during the 11th century. The Greeks had to fight several battles against the Normans in Southern Italy during the mid-11th century. It is likely that Holmi, who is mentioned on two stones, took part in these battles as a member of the Byzantine Emperor's elite unit, the Varangian Guard since they use a name based on the Greek name for the region.

== The runestones ==
Below follows a presentation of the Italy Runestones, organised according to location. The transcriptions from runic inscriptions into standardised Old Norse are in Old East Norse (OEN), the Swedish and Danish dialect, to facilitate comparison with the inscriptions, while the English translation provided by Rundata give the names in the standard dialect, Old West Norse (OWN), the Icelandic and Norwegian dialect.

=== Transliteration and transcription ===
There is a long-standing practice to write transliterations of the runes into Latin characters with boldface and transcribe the text into a normalized form of the language with italic type. This practice exists because the two forms of rendering a runic text have to be kept distinct. By not only showing the original inscription, but also transliterating, transcribing and translating, scholars present the analysis in a way that allows the reader to follow their interpretation of the runes. Every step presents challenges, but most Younger Futhark inscriptions are considered easy to interpret.

In transliterations, *, :, ×, ' and + represent common word dividers. Parentheses, ( ), represent damaged runes that cannot be identified with certainty, and square brackets, [ ], represent sequences of runes that have been lost, but can be identified thanks to early descriptions by scholars. A short hyphen, -, indicates that there is a rune or other sign that cannot be identified. A series of three full stops ... shows that runes are assumed to have existed in the position, but have disappeared. The two dividing signs | | divide a rune into two Latin letters, because runemasters often carved a single rune instead of two consecutive ones.

Angle brackets, < >, indicate that there is a sequence of runes that cannot be interpreted with certainty. Other special signs are þ and ð, where the first one is the thorn letter which represents a voiceless dental fricative as th in English thing. The second letter is eth which stands for a voiced dental fricative as th in English them. The ʀ sign represents the yr rune.

=== Nomenclature ===
Every runic inscription is shown with its ID code that is used in scholarly literature to refer to the inscription, and it is only obligatory to give the first two parts of it. The first part is one or two letters that represent the area where the runic inscription appears, e.g. U for the Uppland, Sö for Södermanland and DR for Denmark. The second part represents the order in which the inscription is presented in the official national publications (e.g. Sveriges runinskrifter). Thus U 133 means that the runestone was the 133rd runic inscription in Uppland that was documented in Sveriges runinskrifter. If the inscription was documented later than the official publication, it is listed according to the publication where it was first described, e.g. Sö Fv1954;22, where Sö represents Södermanland, Fv stands for the annual publication Fornvännen, 1954 is the year of the issue of Fornvännen and 22 is the page in the publication.

=== Uppland ===
There are two rune stones in Uppland that mention Italy. They were raised by the same lady in memory of her son.

==== U 133 ====
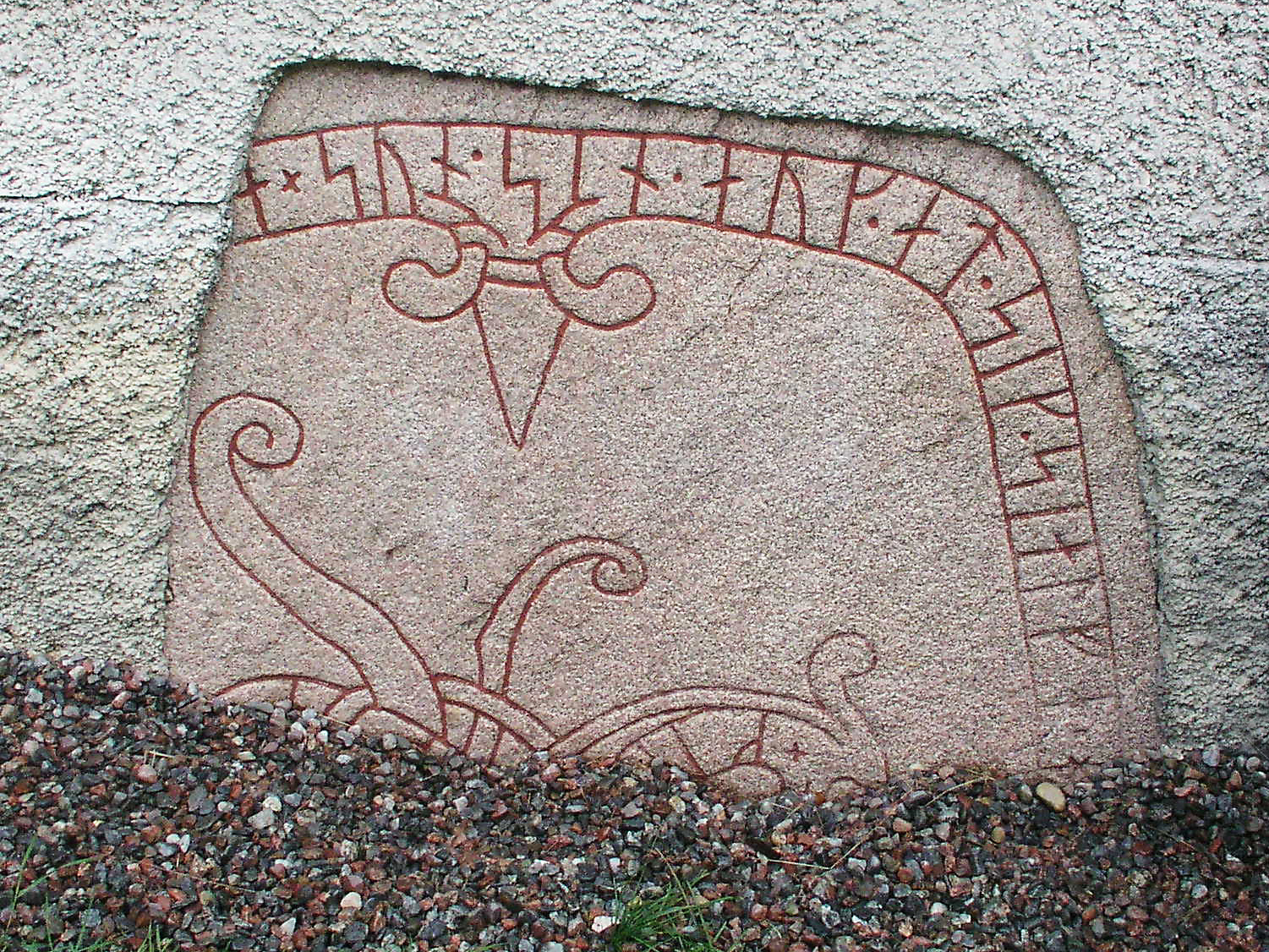
Runestone U 133, first fragment

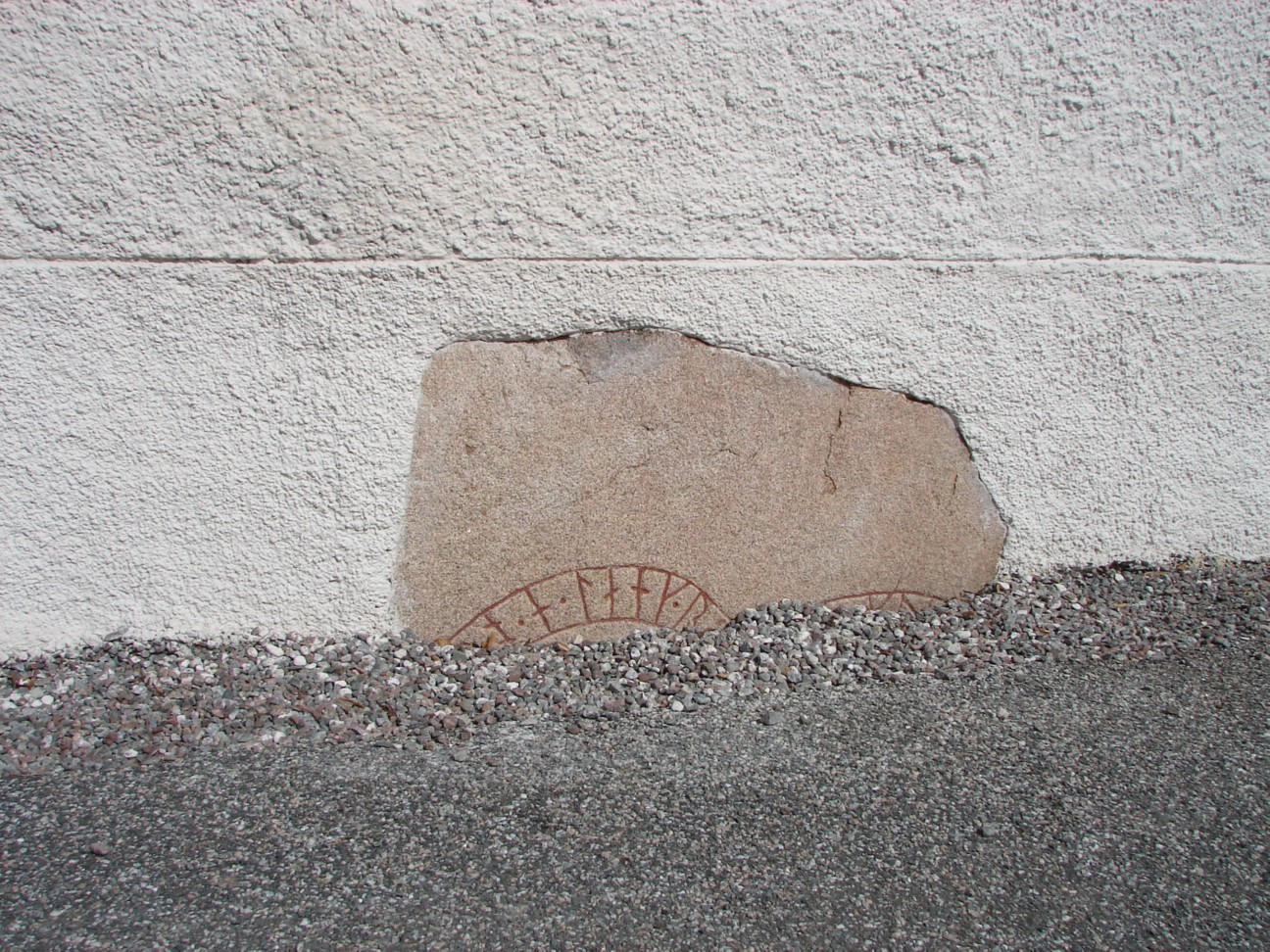
Runestone U 133, second fragment

Runestone U 133 (location) is in style Pr3, part of the more general Urnes style. The stone has been split into two parts that are walled into the southern exterior wall of Täby church, near the ground. The larger fragment, which was originally the upper part of the runestone, is in the western wall of the old porch which is constructed at the church's southern side. The smaller fragment is upside-down in the southern wall of the porch. Both fragments are partly in the soil which means that it is necessary to remove some soil in order to read the entire inscriptions. The larger part was known as early as Johannes Bureus (1568–1652) and it was also studied by Johan Peringskiöld during the national search for historic monuments (1667–84) and by Olof Celsius in 1727. However, the smaller part was not noticed by scholars until 1857, when it was documented by Richard Dybeck, who initially believed that the parts did not belong together. He corrected this interpretation in his Sverikes runurkunder (1865) where he made a depiction of how they would have looked before they were split.

The fragments are in reddish granite and larger part measures 1.02 m (3 ft 4 in) in height and 0.86 m (2 ft 10 in)–1 m (3 ft 3 in) in width, while the smaller one is 0.45 m (1 ft 6 in) tall and 1.23 m (4 ft 0 in) wide. It probably formed a twin monument together with U 141 on the estate of Fittja, before it was moved to the church to be used as building material in the mid-15th century.

Both this runestone and U 141 are identified by von Friesen and Erik Brate as the production of the runemaster Fot. They were commissioned by Guðlaug in memory of her son Holmi who had died in Langbarðaland. Peterson (2002) identifies Guðlaug with the one who commissioned Sö 206 and Sö 208, while Pritsak (1981) identifies her as Ónæmr's daughter who is mentioned on U 328. He further considers Holmi's father to be Özurr who is mentioned on U 328 and U 330.

+ kuþluk * lit ... ... ... ...a × sun * sin * auk * at * sik * sialfa * han * to * a lank*barþa*l--ti *
{} Guðlaug {} let [ræisa stæina at Holm]a, {} sun {} sinn, {} ok {} at {} sik {} sialfa. {} Hann {} do {} a Langbarðal[an]di. {}
"Guðlaug had the stones raised in memory of Holmi, her son, and in memory of herself. He died in Lombardy."

==== U 141 ====
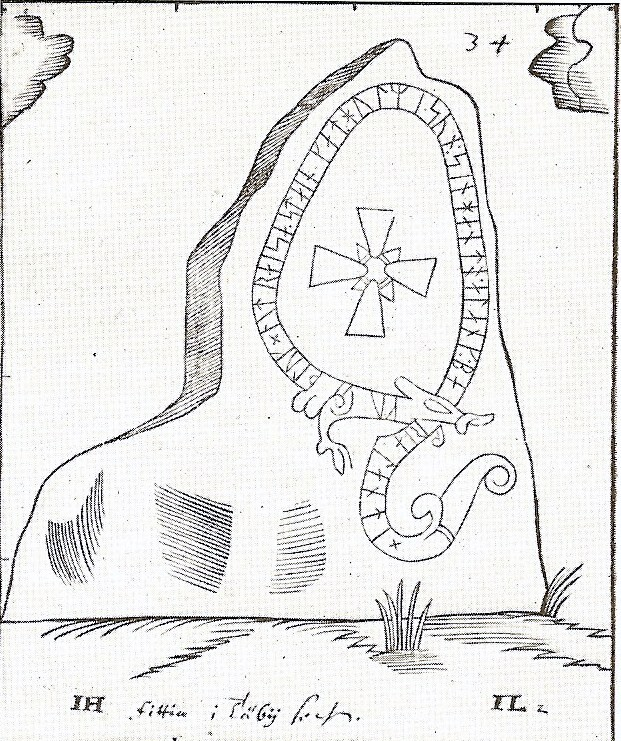
Runestone U 141 in a 17th-century drawing by Johan Hadorph

Runestone U 141 (former location) formed a monument together with U 133, and it was raised by the same grieving mother in memory of her son. It was first documented by Johannes Messenius, in 1611. He appears to have learnt about the runestone from Johannes Bureus as both of them misspelt the name Holmi by letting the m precede the l. Aschaneus (1575–1641) made a note that the runestone was to be seen at the estate of Fittja near Täby. It was also documented by Peringskiöld in his Monumenta, and visited by Celsius in 1727. However, it later disappeared and both Richard Dybeck and later Erik Brate searched for it in vain. However, in 1933, a fragment with the final three runes were discovered during the installation of heating equipment in the cellar of the estate. The granite fragment, which measures 0.45 m (1 ft 6 in) in height and 0.38 m (1 ft 3 in) in width, has been raised in the garden of Fittja.

[kuþluk × lit * raisa * staina * at * hulma * sun * sin * han * to * a * lank*barþa*la(n)ti ×]
Guðlaug {} let {} ræisa {} stæina {} at {} Holma, {} sun {} sinn. {} Hann {} do {} a {} Langbarðalandi. {}
"Guðlaug had the stones raised in memory of Holmi, her son. He died in Lombardy."

=== Södermanland ===
There are two rune stones that mention Italy in Södermanland. However, one of them only says La-, having lost the series of runes that followed. However, the rune stone informs that the location was on the Eastern route, and Langbarðaland is the only known Old Norse place name on the Eastern route that begins with these two runes.

==== Sö Fv1954;22 ====
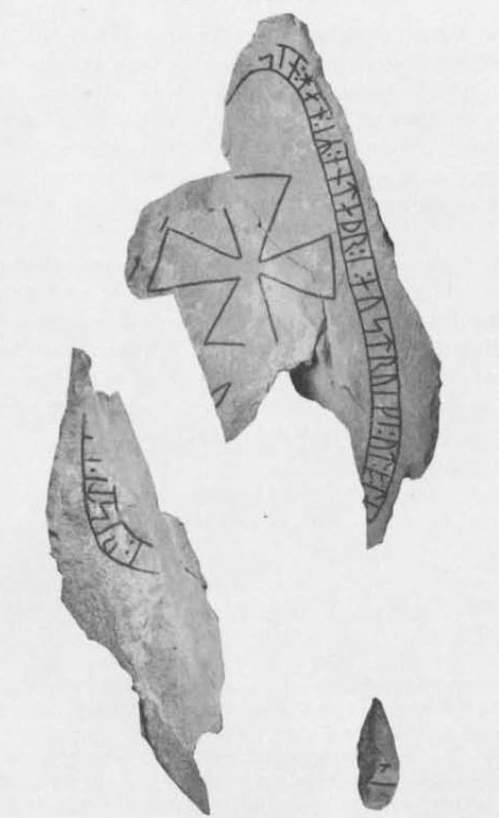
Runestone Sö Fv1954;22

Runestone Sö Fv1954;22 (original location) is in reddish grey and fine grained granite, and it was found in 11 pieces on a small hill about 300 m (980 ft) south-west of the village Lagnö, in 1949. At the location, the land slopes towards the former sailing route Eldsundet, where there once was a medieval assembly location. A house had once been in the same spot and it is likely that the runestone had been used as material in its stone foundation, or in a stove. The stone was moved to a conservation institute in Stockholm where it was mended but it was impossible to make a complete runestone out of it. In 1953, Jansson visited the location and he managed to retrieve some more fragments, adding up to a total of fifteen pieces. However, only twelve could be put together. The largest fragment is 1.40 m (4 ft 7 in) high, 0.65 m (2 ft 2 in) wide and 0.33 m (1 ft 1 in) thick, whereas the second largest one is 1.30 m (4 ft 3 in) high, 0.25 m (9.8 in) m wide and 0.33 m (1 ft 1 in) thick. The expression i austrvegi ("on the eastern route") also appears on the runestones Sö 34 and Sö 126 in the same province, where it figures in poems in fornyrðislag. The last word in the inscription, which tells where the commemorated man died, is partly lost, but Jansson (1954) notes that it was probably Langbarðaland as it begins with La-. The fragments are presently stored inside the Swedish History Museum in Stockholm.

...i : risti : ---... ... ...in... ... sin : han : iʀ : entaþr : i : austruiki : ut : o : la-...
... {} ræisti {} ... ... ... ... sinn. {} Hann {} eʀ {} ændaðr {} i {} austrvegi {} ut {} a {} La[ngbarðalandi](?).
"... raised ... ... ... ... his. He met his end on the eastern route abroad in Lombardy(?)."

==== Sö 65 ====
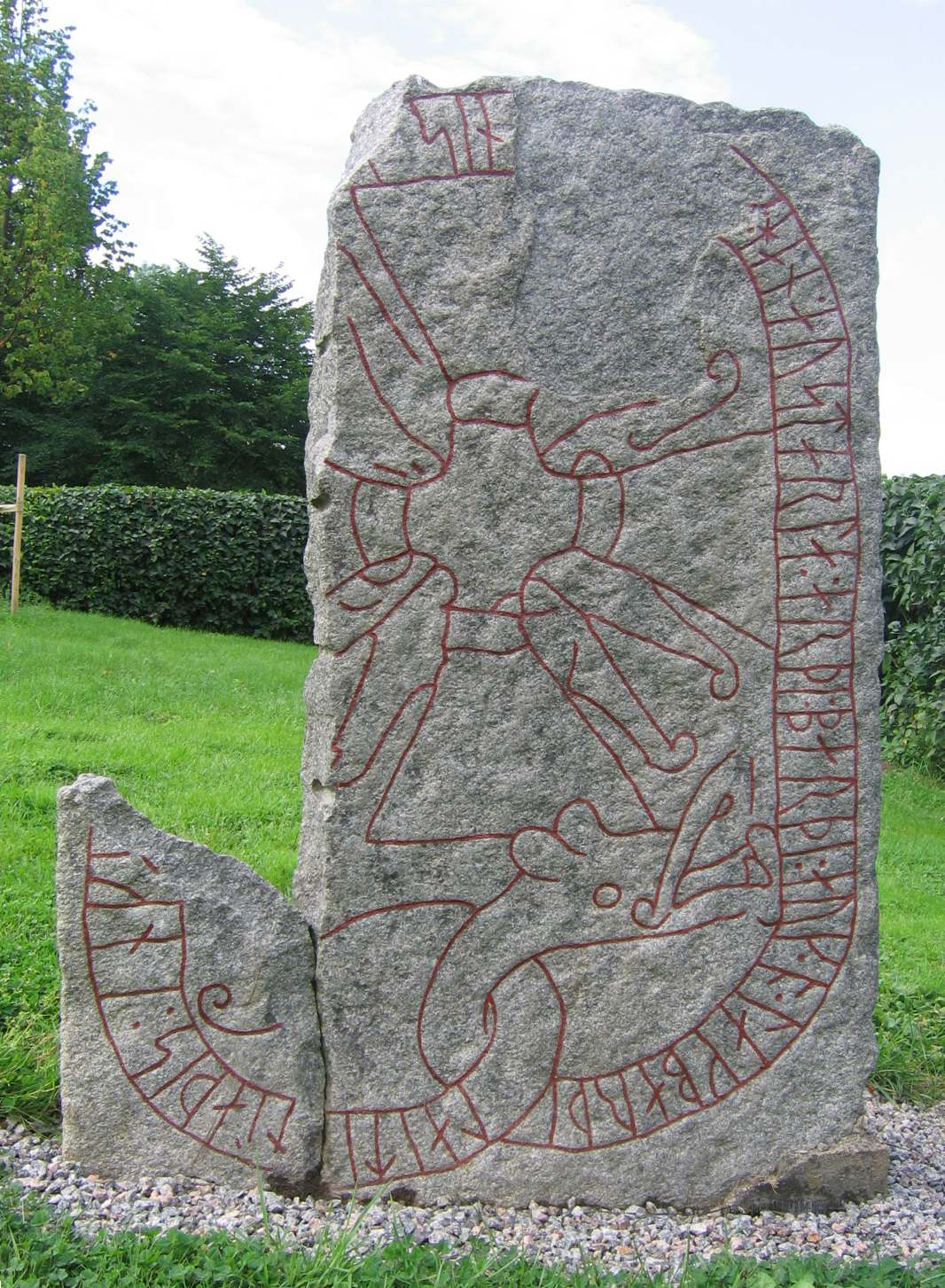
Runestone Sö 65

Runestone Sö 65 is in style Pr1 (Ringerike style) and it was documented at the farm Djul(e)fors during the national search for historic monuments (1667–84). It is nowadays in the south-eastern end of the park of Eriksberg palace (location). It measures c. 1.50 m (4 ft 11 in) in height. Brate & Wessén commented (1924–1936) that a third of the stone had been lost to its left and that it was 0.71 m (2 ft 4 in) wide at its base and 0.63 m (2 ft 1 in) wide at the top. The 2008 edition of the Scandinavian Runic-text Database reports that a missing part was discovered in 1934, and Swedish National Heritage Board includes the rediscovered part in the stone's dimensions reporting its width to be 1.06 m (3 ft 6 in).

Sophus Bugge noted in his Runverser that the expression arði barði ("ploughed his stern") also appears in the Icelandic Third Grammatical Treatise by Óláfr Þórðarson, and as well in a verse by the Orkney jarl Rögnvald Brusason. He also commented that the epitaph is in the meter that Snorri Sturluson called hinn skammi háttr. Furthermore, he added that since seafaring played an important role in the lives of all Norse peoples, it would only be natural if they had many poetic expressions like arði barði in common (cf. Sö 198).

[inka : raisti : stain : þansi : at : ulai](f) : sin : [a...k] : han : austarla : arþi : barþi : auk : o : lakbarþilanti : [anlaþis +]
Inga {} ræisti {} stæin {} þannsi {} at {} Olæif {} sinn {} ... {} Hann {} austarla {} arði {} barði {} ok {} a {} Langbarðalandi {} andaðis. {}
"Inga raised this stone in memory of Óleifr, her ... He ploughed his stern to the east, and met his end in the land of the Lombards."

== See also ==
- List of runestones

== Sources ==
- Brate, Erik; Wessen, Elias (1924–1936). "Sveriges Runinskrifter: III. Södermanlands Runinskrifter". Sveriges Runinskrifter (in Swedish). Stockholm: Kungl. Vitterhets Historie och Antikvitets Akademien. ISSN 0562-8016.
- Jansson, Sven B. F. (1954). "Uppländska, Småländska och Sörmländska Runstensfynd" (PDF). Fornvännen (in Swedish). 49. Swedish National Heritage Board: 1–25. ISSN 1404-9430.
- (in Swedish) Larsson, Mats G (2002). Götarnas Riken : Upptäcktsfärder Till Sveriges Enande. Bokförlaget Atlantis AB ISBN 978-91-7486-641-4
- (in Swedish) Nordisk runnamslexikon by Lena Peterson at the Swedish Institute for Linguistics and Heritage (Institutet för språk och folkminnen).
- Pritsak, Omeljan. (1981). The Origin of Rus'. Cambridge, Mass.: Distributed by Harvard University Press for the Harvard Ukrainian Research Institute. ISBN 0-674-64465-4
- Wessén, E.; Jansson, Sven B. F. (1940–1943). "Sveriges Runinskrifter: VI. Upplands Runinskrifter del 1". Sveriges Runinskrifter (in Swedish). Stockholm: Kungl. Vitterhets Historie och Antikvitets Akademien. ISSN 0562-8016.
- Peterson, Lena; Elmevik, Lennart; Williams, Henrik, eds. (2008-12-03). Scandinavian Runic-text Database (2008 ed.). Department of Scandinavian Languages, Uppsala University.
- (in Swedish) ''2. Runriket - Täby Kyrka'', an online article of the Stockholm County Museum, retrieved July 1, 2007.
