= Argyrus (catepan of Italy) =

Byzantine general

Argyrus (or Argyros, Greek: Αργυρός; c. 1000–1068) was a Lombard nobleman and Byzantine general, son of the Lombard hero Melus. He was born in Bari.

Upon the defeat of Melus, who had rebelled against the Byzantines, at the battle of Cannae in 1018, Argyrus and his mother were captured and taken to Constantinople as prisoners. He was out of confinement by 1038, when he returned to Apulia, then in an uproar over being pressed into service during the Byzantine invasion of Sicily. The Lombard troops returned with their Norman and Varangian comrades in 1039, alienated by General George Maniaches.

In 1040, the Lombards of southern Italy revolted against their Greek overlords, with the support of Norman mercenaries, and slew the catepan Nikephoros Dokeianos. In March, the rebels scored a first victory, against the new catepan, Michael Dokeianos, near the Olivento. On 3 September 1041, they defeated another Byzantine catepan, Exaugustus, the son of Basil Boioannes, and took him captive. Soon they were joined by the Lombards and Normans of Melfi under Arduin. In February 1042, the original nominal leader, Atenulf, brother of the prince of Benevento, defected with the catepan's ransom money to the Greeks and was replaced by Argyrus. After some early successes, Argyrus also defected to the Byzantines. It is assumed that he received a bribe of money from Constantine IX, who certainly wrote him letters offering it, and the title of catepan of Italy.

When the revolt in Apulia was suppressed, the Byzantines, under advice from Argyrus, who travelled to Constantinople and received the title of "Duke of Italy, Calabria, Sicily, and Paphlagonia", formed an alliance with the Papacy to counter the emergence of the Norman menace in the area. One Sico, a protospatharios, was sent to assist him. Argyrus commanded the Byzantine army, which did not join the papal army at the Battle of Civitate, in which their forces were routed and Pope Leo IX was captured.

Argyrus was catepan until 1058. Little is known about him after that date: he perhaps died in 1068 at Bari, Vieste or Atella. Before his death he gave the Abbey of Farfa a rich silk garment which still exists.

Preceded by John Raphael	Catepan of Italy; 1050–1058	Succeeded by Miriarch
