= Battle of Montepeloso =

- Part of the Norman conquest of southern Italy
Date	3 September 1041
Location	Monte Siricolo, near Montepeloso, Byzantine Italy 40°45′00″N 16°14′00″E
Result	Lombard-Norman victory

Belligerents
Byzantine Empire: Varangian Guard	Lombards; Normans

Commanders and leaders
Exagustus (POW)	William Iron Arm
- Location within Italy

The Battle of Montepeloso was fought on 3 September 1041 between Lombard-Norman rebel forces and the Byzantine Empire, near Montepeloso in southern Italy. The Byzantines, led by Exaugustus Boioannes, were forced into battle by the rebels, and after a day-long fight the rebels defeated the Byzantine army and captured Boioannes. The decisive rebel victory forced the Byzantines to retreat to the coastal cities, leaving the Normans and Lombards in control of the whole interior of southern Italy.

== Background ==
The battle of Montepeloso was part of a Lombard-Norman revolt against the Byzantine Empire in southern Italy, with preceding battles at Olivento in March, and at Montemaggiore in May, both rebel victories. Before the battle, the Normans and Lombards agreed on choosing Atenulf, brother of Pandulf III of Benevento, as their new leader, while the Byzantine Catepan Michael Dokeianos was replaced by Exaugustus Boioannes.

The new overall leader of the revolt, Atenulf, was part of the ruling Beneventan family and a rival to the Norman sponsor Guaimar IV of Salerno, but although the rebel army was led by Norman military leaders, the Normans could not yet afford to break with their Lombard allies.

== Battle ==
After the battle of Montemaggiore, Boioannes made an attempt to lay siege to Melfi, which had been captured by the rebels. In response, the Normans and Lombards counter-attacked Boioannes' camp at Monte Siricolo, near Montepeloso (modern Irsina) on the Bradano river. The Byzantine army under Boioannes had been safe within the stronghold of Montepeloso, but as the rebels wanted to avoid the strains associated with a siege, they forced the Byzantines and the Varangian Guard into battle by stealing their cattle. The battle went on to last most of the day with intense fighting, but the Norman cavalry, led by William Iron Arm, managed to secure a decisive victory for the rebels. Boioannes was captured by the rebels during the battle and held for ransom.

== Aftermath ==
The rebel victory forced the Byzantine army to retreat to the coastal cities, leaving the entire interior of southern Italy to the Norman and Lombard rebels. Following the victory, the town of Matera switched its support to the revolt, while the coastal cities Bari, Monopoli and Giovinazzo relinquished their allegiance to the Byzantine Empire in order to avoid Norman raids.

After the battle, the rebel leader Atenulf was sent back home after it was found that he had kept the money received for Boioannes ransom for himself. Although the Norman knights pushed for the next leader to be a Norman, they were in the end outvoted by the Lombards and had to settle for Argyrus from Bari.

The battle of Montepeloso was the last pitched battle fought between Normans and Byzantines in the Italian peninsula.

== Sources ==
- Brown, Gordon S. (2003). The Norman Conquest of Southern Italy and Sicily. Jefferson, NC: McFarland & Company Inc., Publishers. ISBN 978-0-7864-1472-7.
- Jacques, Tony (2007). Dictionary of Battles and Sieges: A Guide to 8,500 Battles from Antiquity through the Twenty-first Century. Westport, CT: Greenwood Press. ISBN 978-0-313-33538-9.
- Rogers, Clifford J. (2010). The Oxford Encyclopedia of Medieval Warfare and Military Technology. Vol. 1. New York, NY: Oxford University Press. ISBN 978-0-19-533403-6.
