= New England (medieval) =

Reputed 11th-century Byzantine colony on the Black Sea

The New England (Latin: Nova Anglia) of Eastern Europe was a colony allegedly founded either in the 1070s or the 1090s by Anglo-Saxon refugees fleeing the Norman invasion of England. Its existence is attested in two sources, the French Chronicon Universale Anonymi Laudunensis (which ends in 1219) and the 14th-century Icelandic Játvarðar Saga. They tell the story of a journey from England to Constantinople through the Mediterranean Sea, where the English refugees fought off a siege by heathens and were rewarded by the Byzantine Emperor Alexius I Comnenus. A group of them were given land to the north-east of the Black Sea, reconquering it and renaming their territory "New England".

The hypothesis of an Anglo-Saxon settlement on the Black Sea coast was put forward by Jonathan Shepard in the 1970s. No archaeological evidence of such a settlement has been discovered.

== Sources ==
There are two extant sources which give an account of the foundation of "New England". The first account is the Chronicon Universale Anonymi Laudunensis. This was written by an English monk at the Premonstratensian monastery in Laon, Picardy, and covers the history of the world until 1219. The Chronicon survives in two 13th-century manuscripts, one in the Bibliothèque Nationale, Paris (Lat. 5011), and the other in the Staatsbibliothek, Berlin (Phillipps 1880). The second is the text known as the Játvarðar Saga (Saga Játvarðar konungs hins helga), an Icelandic saga about the life of King of England Edward the Confessor. It was compiled in the 14th century in Iceland, probably using the Chronicon Universale Anonymi Laudunensis (or common ancestor) as a source.

== Account ==
Játvarðar Saga relates that when the English, fighting against William the Conqueror, became sure that the Danish king Sveinn Ástríðarson would no longer help them, they agreed to leave England for Constantinople (Miklagarðr). The English force consisted of 350 ships, a "great host" and "three earls and eight barons", all led by one "Siward earl of Gloucester" (Sigurðr jarl af Glocestr). They sailed past Pointe Saint-Mathieu (Matheus-nes), Galicia (Galizuland), through the Strait of Gibraltar (Nörvasundz) to Ceuta (Septem). They captured Ceuta, killing its Muslim defenders and plundering its gold and silver. After Ceuta, they seized Mallorca and Menorca, before embarking to Sicily, where they heard that Constantinople was being besieged by infidels.

The English sailed to Constantinople, vanquishing the besieging fleet and clearing the heathen army. The ruler of Constantinople, Alexios I Komnenos (Kirjalax), offered to take the English into service, allowing them to live in Constantinople as his bodyguards, "as was the wont of the Varangians who went into his pay". While some of the English liked this idea, Siward and some others desired a realm of their own to rule over into old age. Alexius told them of a land over the sea that had formerly been under the emperor of Constantinople but was now occupied by heathens. The emperor granted this land to the English, and a party led by Siward sailed for this land while another party of English remained in the service of Alexius. The land lay "6 days north and north-east of Constantinople", and was won by Siward, who after many battles drove away the heathens. They called it "England" and the territory's main towns were called "London", "York", and "by the names of other great towns in England". The English did not adopt "St Paul's law" (the Eastern rite liturgy) but instead sought bishops and other clergymen from the Kingdom of Hungary. The descendants of these English are said to have remained in the region ever since.

The story told by the Chronicon Universale Anonymi Laudunensis is largely the same in summary but has a few variant details. It does not name the Danish king (Sveinn Ástríðarson), named as "Sveinn son of Ulf" by the Játvarðar Saga. Likewise, it does not mention the route taken by the English to the Mediterranean, a route added by the Icelandic author(s) probably from "general knowledge". There are other small variants, like, for instance, "William king of England" (Willelmus rex Anglie) in the Chronicon is called by the Játvarðar Saga "William the Bastard" (Viljálmr bastharðr), "Sicily" in the saga is "Sardinia" in the Chronicon, the names of the cities (London and York) are not given by the Chronicon, and the "New England" (Nova Anglia) of the Chronicon is called only "England" by the saga. A bigger variant is that the Earl "Siward" (Sigurðr) of the saga is called Stanardus by the Chronicon. Most of the narrative however is largely the same, the numbers and ranks of the earls and barons, their ships, as is the sailing distance from Constantinople to the colony. The Chronicon, after its account of the foundation of New England, adds that when Alexius sent an official to take tribute from them, the "eastern English" (Angli orientales) killed the official; the English who remained in Constantinople, fearing that Alexius would take his revenge upon them, are said to have fled to New England and to have taken up piracy.

== Historicity ==
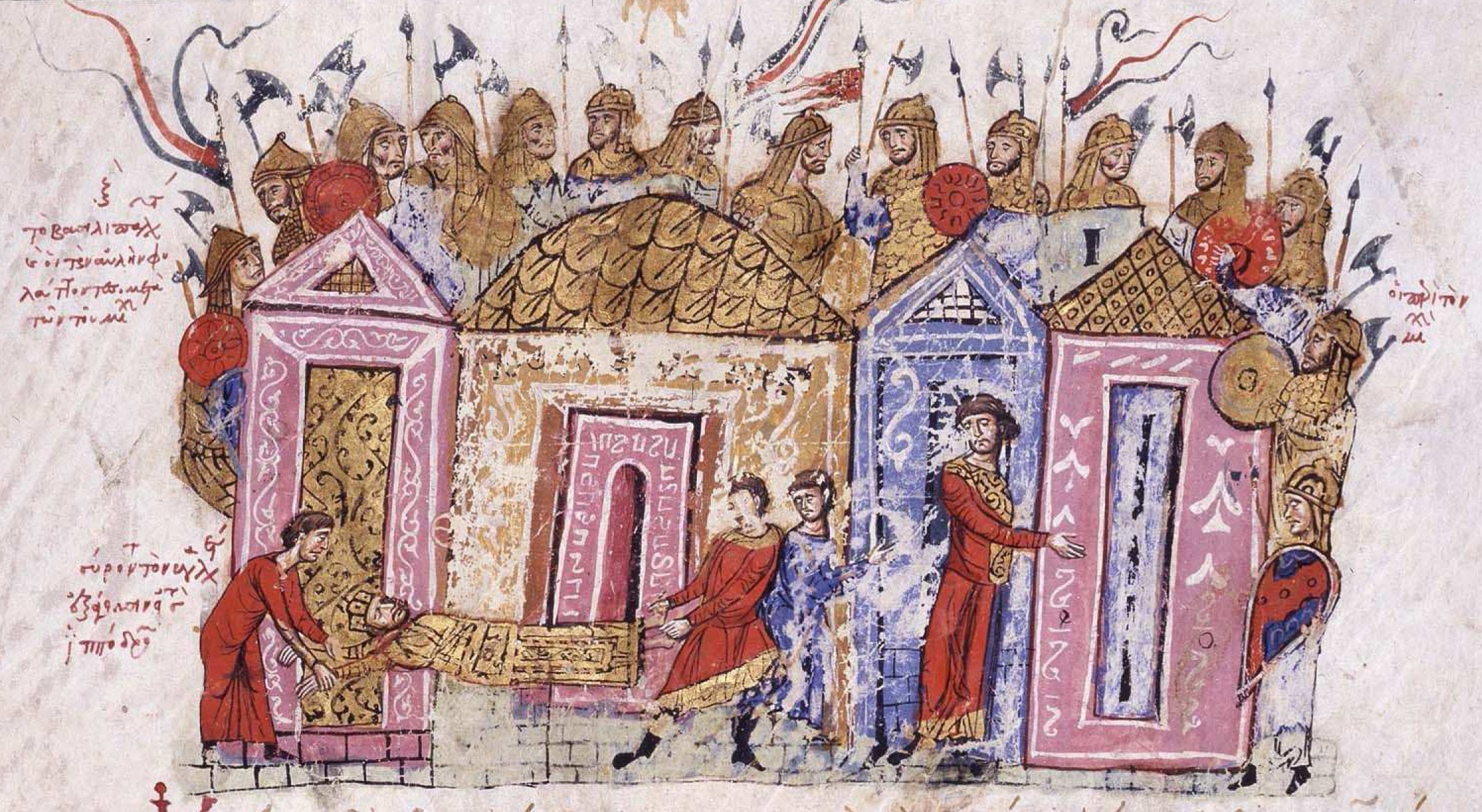
Varangian Guard, an illumination from the Skylitzes Chronicle; many if not most members of the Varangian Guard were English after the 11th century.

It is generally agreed among historians that English Anglo-Saxons did migrate to Constantinople in these years and joined the Varangian Guard, something which can be shown from other sources. A more reliable source, closer to the events in question, is the Ecclesiastical History of Orderic Vitalis. Orderic, after an account of the Norman Conquest of England and the failure of the northern rebellion, summarised the responses of the defeated English as follows:

And so the English groaned aloud for their lost liberty and plotted ceaselessly to find some way of shaking off a yoke that was so intolerable and unaccustomed. Some sent to Sveinn, king of Denmark, and urged him to lay claim to the kingdom of England ... Others went into voluntary exile so that they might either find in banishment freedom from the power of the Normans or secure foreign help and come back and fight a war of vengeance. Some of them who were still in the flower of their youth travelled into remote lands and bravely offered their arms to Alexius, emperor of Constantinople, a man of great wisdom and nobility. Robert Guiscard, duke of Apulia, had taken up arms against him in support of Michael whom the Greeks—resenting the power of the Senate—had driven from the imperial throne. Consequently the English exiles were warmly welcomed by the Greeks and were sent into battle against the Norman forces, which were too powerful for the Greeks alone. The Emperor Alexius laid the foundations of a town called Civitot for the English, some distance from Byzantium; but later when the Norman threat became too great he brought them back to the imperial city and set them to guard his chief palace and royal treasures. This is the reason for the exodus of the English Saxons to Ionia; the emigrants and their heirs faithfully served the holy empire, and are still honoured among the Greeks by the Emperor, nobility, and people alike.

Beyond this account, the details of the story of New England cannot be verified; the sources in question are late, and many of the elements are, in the words of one historian, "fantastic". Many historians have nevertheless embraced the historicity of the colony. Among them are Jonathan Shepard, Christine Fell, and Răzvan Theodorescu. Shepard argues that the Siward of the account is Siward Barn, a high-ranking English rebel last heard of in 1087 when he had been released from prison by the dying King William. Siward is the only significant English magnate of the time to have held land in Gloucestershire, but as this Siward was imprisoned from 1071 to 1087, he could not have been in Constantinople in 1075, the year the Chronicon has the English arrive in Constantinople. Shepard thus reinterprets the account to match certain historical events, arguing that the voyage of these English Varangians took place after Alexius's call for help in 1091, and that the English fleet is the same one as that operated by Edgar the Ætheling.
