= Battle of Olivento =

Battle in Italy in 1041

- Part of the Norman conquest of southern Italy
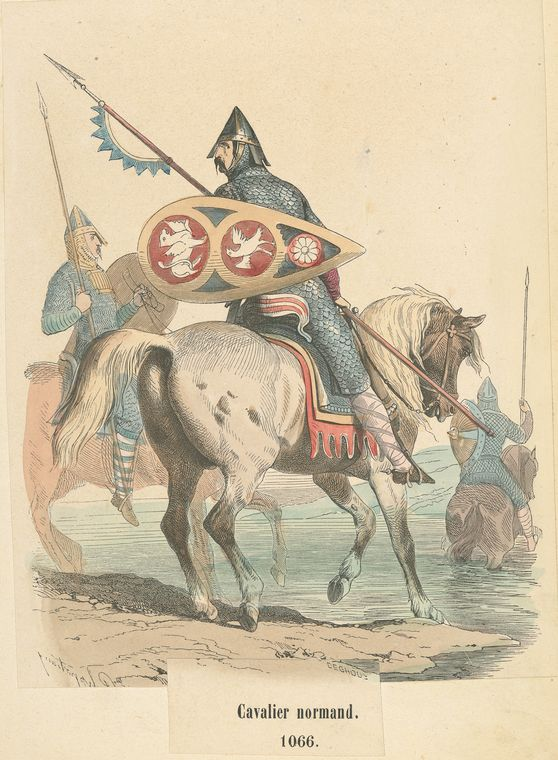
- England Normand cavalier 1066
Date	17 March 1041
Location	Olivento river, Apulia, Byzantine Italy
Result	Norman victory

Belligerents
Byzantine Empire: Varangian Guard	Normans; Lombards

Commanders and leaders
Michael Dokeianos; Harald Hardrada	William Iron Arm

Strength
Several thousand troops	300 Norman knights 600 foot soldiers

Casualties and losses
Unknown	Unknown

The Battle of Olivento was fought on 17 March 1041 between the Byzantine Empire and the Normans of southern Italy and their Lombard allies near the Olivento river, between the actual Basilicata and Apulia, southern Italy.

== History ==
The battle had its origin in the decision of Arduin the Lombard, a Greek-speaking Lombard who had fought for the Byzantines, to change sides and form a coalition with the Normans Rainulf Drengot and the Hauteville brothers (William Iron Arm, Drogo, Humphrey), and the Lombards Atenulf of Benevento and Argyrus of Bari. Once having defeated the imperial armies, they would take for themselves the conquered lands.

The Byzantine catepan of Italy, Michael Dokeianos, moved from Bari with the few troops he could muster, including some Varangians (most notably Harald Hardrada, the future king of Norway), troops from the Opsikion tagma and several Thracesians. He was able to defeat the first rebel troops he met, and he pursued them at Ascoli Satriano. Here he was met by an army of 300 Norman Knights and 600 infantry under Rainulf Drengot, Arduin and William Iron Arm. Prior to the battle Dokeianos sent an envoy to the Lombard-Norman army to give them a choice of returning to Lombard territory or to fight the numerically superior Byzantine Army. Once the envoy was done giving the terms, Hugh Touboeuf, the Norman knight who had been holding the reins to the envoy's mount-killed the horse by hitting it in the back of the head with his gauntlet. After the envoy was given another horse he was sent back to Dokeianos with the Normans' reply choosing battle.

The rebels had deployed the cavalry in the centre, with the infantry on the wings. The Byzantines launched several waves of attacks against the Norman cavalry. However, the Normans resisted and counter-attacked, defeating the Byzantines with a decisive cavalry charge. The Greek troops fled, and many of them drowned in the river. The catepan himself was barely able to escape alive, as was Hardrada. According to the Annals of Bari, Dokeianos and the surviving Byzantine troops retreated to Montepeloso.

The battle of Olivento was the first of the numerous successes scored by the Normans in their conquest of southern Italy. After the battle, they conquered Ascoli, Venosa, Gravina di Puglia. It was followed by other Normans victories over the Byzantines in the battles of Montemaggiore and Montepeloso, leading to the Normans occupying the interior of southern Italy.

== Bibliography ==
- De Blasiis, Giuseppe (1869–1873). L'insurrezione Pugliese e la conquista normanna nel secolo XI. Naples.
- Brown, Gordon S. (2003). The Norman Conquest of Southern Italy and Sicily. McFarland & Company Inc. ISBN 978-0-7864-1472-7.
- Stroock, William (2011). "How to fight and win like a Norman: Strategy and tactics of the Norman". Medieval Warfare. 1 (4): 13–15 – via JSTOR.
