= Sico Protospatharios =

Byzantine general

Sico (Italian: Sicone) (died 1054) was a Byzantine protospatharios leading troops in Italy from about 1052. He had a Lombard name, though he was a Greek official. He was an official under Argyrus.

Sico was killed in battle outside the walls of Matera fighting the Normans of Humphrey of Hauteville.

== Sources ==
- Gay, Jules. L'Italie méridionale et l'empire Byzantin: Livre II. Burt Franklin: New York, 1904.
