= Battle of Montemaggiore =

Battle in 1041 in Italy

- Part of the Norman conquest of southern Italy
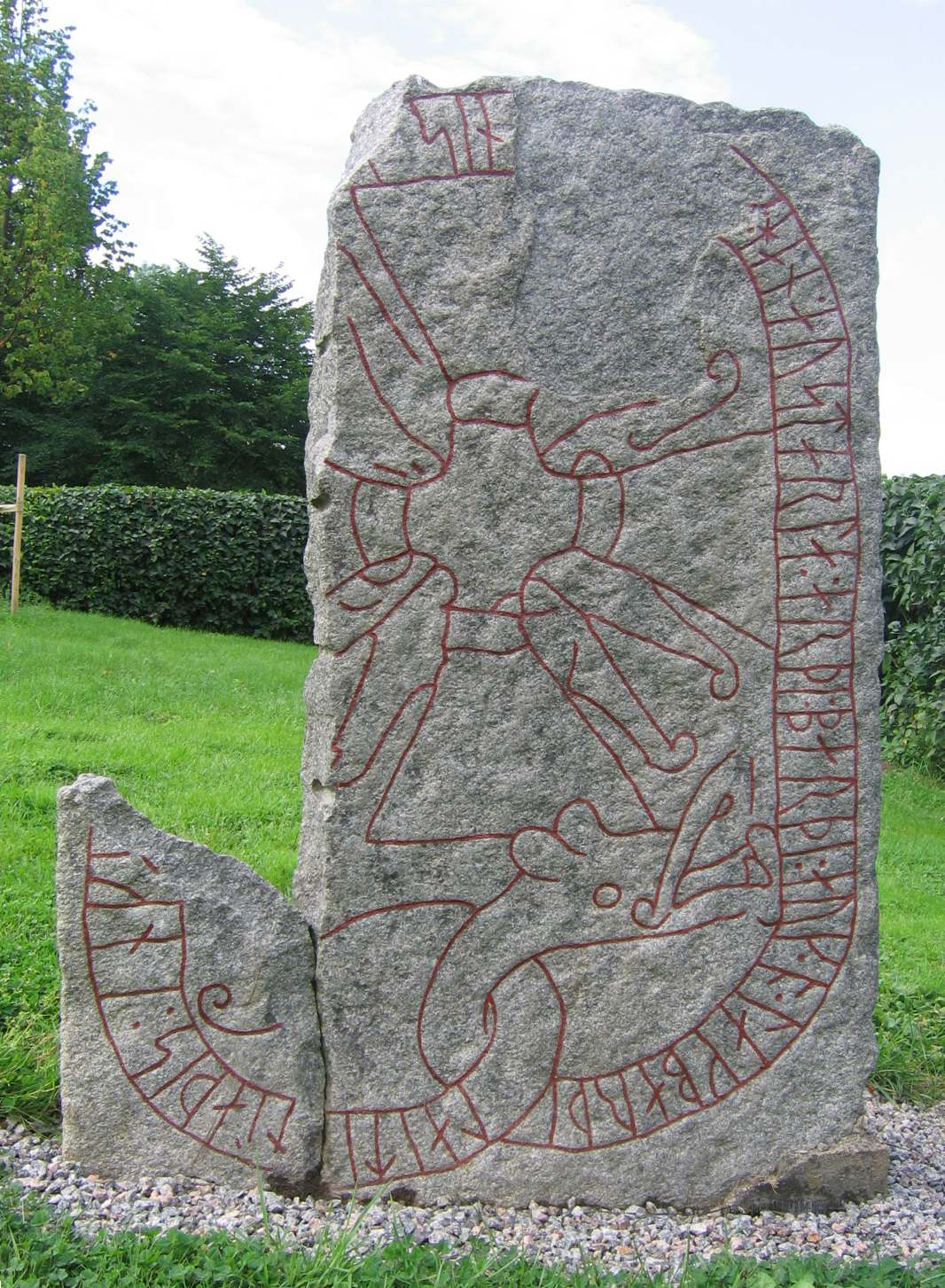
- A runestone from Södermanland, Sweden, in contemporary Ringerike style commemorating a Varangian Guard fallen in Langbarðalandi
Date	4 May 1041
Location	Ofanto river, near Cannae, Byzantine Italy 41°21′00″N 16°13′00″E
Result	Norman victory

Belligerents
Byzantine Empire: Varangian Guard	Normans: Lombard auxiliaries (Note: ... who had now allied with themselves a considerable host of Italians living around the river Po and in the foothills of the Alps)

Commanders and leaders
Michael Dokeianos; Harald Hardrada	William Iron Arm; Rainulf Drengot

Strength
Several thousand (Brown); 18,000 (Bari Annals)	700 Norman knights 1,300 infantry soldiers (Humble)

Casualties and losses
Heavy	Unknown
- Location within Italy

The Battle of Montemaggiore (or Monte Maggiore) was fought on 4 May 1041, on the river Ofanto near Cannae in Byzantine Italy, between Lombard-Norman rebel forces and the Byzantine Empire. The Norman William Iron Arm led the offence, which was part of a greater revolt, against Michael Dokeianos, the Byzantine Catepan of Italy. Suffering heavy losses in the battle, the Byzantines were eventually defeated, and the remaining forces retreated to Bari. Dokeianos was replaced and transferred to Sicily as a result of the battle. The victory provided the Normans with increasing amounts of resources, as well as a renewed surge of knights joining the rebellion.

== Background ==
The battle was fought on 4 May 1041, less than two months after the Battle of Olivento, the first battle of a renewed revolt of Lombard-Norman forces against the Byzantine Empire instigated by Arduin the Lombard. The battle at Olivento was the first battle between Normans and Byzantines since the Battle of Cannae in 1018, but the outcome shifted this time from Byzantine victory to defeat.

While the Normans originally only fought as mercenaries in Italy, they took increasing control during the 1041 revolt, and started to carve out territory for themselves after the Battle of Montemaggiore. The site of the battle was the river Ofanto near Cannae, but the name of the mountain Montemaggiore is usually used to refer to the 1041 battle.

== Battle ==
The Norman offence at Montemaggiore was led by William Iron Arm, who was elected the leader of the Normans. Also present were William's two younger brothers, Drogo and Humphrey. The Norman contingent gained considerable strength following the previous battle at Olivento, as new Lombard auxiliaries from the northern part of Italy and Norman mercenaries from Salerno and Aversa, led by Rainulf Drengot, bolstered their ranks. The Norman army is said to have included 2,000 Norman knights, considered an inflated number by modern historians, in addition to Lombard infantry and heavy cavalry formations. Historian Richard Humble has put the army's numbers at 700 Norman knights and about 1,300 foot soldiers, roughly double the number estimated by Gordon S. Brown for the preceding battle, in Olivento.

The Byzantine catepan, Michael Dokeianos, met the Normans with a numerically greater army. His army is claimed to have included 18,000 men in the Bari Annals (Annales barenses), but estimated by Brown as "several thousand" (at Olivento). The army was divided into two lines, and consisted of fresh troops from Asia and returning soldiers from Sicily. The Byzantine forces also included the Norse-dominated Varangian Guard, led by the future Norwegian king Harald Hardrada, and was morally bolstered by the presence of two Greek Rite bishops from Troia and Ofanto.

The Normans attacked the Byzantines in a spearhead formation, which led the first line to be driven into the second, and in turn causing confusion among the Byzantines. William suffered from fever and initially watched the fight from a hill, but eventually joined the battle as he was overcome with excitement. A great number of Byzantine soldiers, including the two bishops, drowned in the Ofanto attempting to flee. A particularly great number of Varangians also fell in battle, and the Byzantines were eventually defeated in the battle. The Norman victory has been attributed in particular to the addition of the Norman heavy cavalry.

== Aftermath ==
With the Byzantine army crushed, Michael Dokeianos fell back to the port of Bari, requesting new reinforcements from Sicily. Instead, Dokeianos was transferred to Sicily and replaced by Exaugustus Boioannes. The victory at Montemaggiore provided the Normans with their first significant acquisition of war booty, including military equipment, horses, tents, precious fabrics, as well as gold and silver vessels. The enrichment of the soldiers in turn attracted more knights to join the rebellion. The 1041 Lombard-Norman revolt was followed by a third and final battle, the Battle of Montepeloso in September.

== Sources ==
- Beeler, John (1971). Warfare in Feudal Europe: 730-1200. Ithaca, NY: Cornell University Press. ISBN 978-0-8014-9120-7.
- Blöndal, Sigfús; Benedikz, Benedikt S. (2007) [1978]. The Varangians of Byzantium. Cambridge, NY: Cambridge University. ISBN 978-0-521-21745-3.
- Bradbury, Jim (2004). The Routledge Companion to Medieval Warfare. New York, NY: Routledge. ISBN 978-0-415-22126-9.
- Brown, Gordon S. (2003). The Norman Conquest of Southern Italy and Sicily. Jefferson, NC: McFarland & Company Inc., Publishers. ISBN 978-0-7864-1472-7.
- Gravett, Christopher; Nicolle, David (2007). The Normans: Warrior Knights and Their Castles. Oxford, UK and New York, NY: Osprey Publishing Limited. ISBN 978-1-84603-218-9.
- Humble, Richard (1989). Warfare in the Middle Ages. United States: Mallard Press. ISBN 978-0-7924-5089-4.
- Jaques, Tony (2007). Dictionary of Battles and Sieges: A Guide to 8,500 Battles from Antiquity through the Twenty-first Century. Westport, CT: Greenwood Press. ISBN 978-0-313-33538-9.
- Jansen, Katherine L.; Drell, Joanna; Andrews, Frances (2010). Medieval Italy: Texts in Translation. Philadelphia, PA: University of Pennsylvania Press. ISBN 978-0-8122-2058-2.
- Kleinhenz, Christopher (2004). Medieval Italy: An Encyclopedia. Vol. 2. New York and London: Routledge. ISBN 978-0-415-93931-7.
- Rogers, Clifford J. (2010). The Oxford Encyclopedia of Medieval Warfare and Military Technology. Vol. 1. New York, NY: Oxford University Press. ISBN 978-0-19-533403-6.
- Wortley, John, ed. (2010). John Skylitzes: A Synopsis of Byzantine History, 811–1057. Cambridge: Cambridge University Press. ISBN 978-0-521-76705-7.
