= Michael Dokeianos =

Byzantine catepan of Italy

- Μιχαήλ Δοκειανός
- Died: 1050; Basilike Libas, near Adrianople (modern-day Edirne, Turkey)
- Relatives: Isaac I Komnenos, John Komnenos (brothers-in-law)
- Military career
- Conflicts: Lombard-Norman revolt of 1041, Battle of Basilike Libas

Michael Dokeianos (Greek: Μιχαήλ Δοκειανός), erroneously called Doukeianos by some modern writers, was a Byzantine nobleman and military leader, who married into the Komnenos family. He was active in Sicily under George Maniakes before going to Southern Italy as Catepan of Italy in 1040–41. He was recalled after being twice defeated in battle during the Lombard-Norman revolt of 1041, a decisive moment in the eventual Norman conquest of southern Italy. He is next recorded in 1050, fighting against a Pecheneg raid in Thrace. He was captured during battle but managed to maim the Pecheneg leader, after which he was put to death and mutilated.

== Biography ==
The family name of Dokeianos is considered to derive from Dok[e]ia in the Armeniac Theme. The family only came into prominence in the mid-11th century, with Michael one of the first to be mentioned. He is generally considered as the Dokeianos who married an unnamed daughter of Manuel Erotikos Komnenos and sister of the future emperor Isaac I Komnenos (reigned 1057–59), probably ca. 1030. Together, they had a son, Theodore Dokeianos. According to the near-contemporary official and historian John Skylitzes, Michael Dokeianos was a simple man and not suited for command, and according to the modern scholar Konstantinos Varzos he owed his rise to high office to his family ties with the Komnenoi. It is known that he was wealthy, and possessed estates in Paphlagonia, possibly adjacent or part of the Komnenos family estates in the same region.

=== In Italy ===
Southern Italy ca. 1000, with the Byzantine provinces in yellow

Michael Dokeianos is first mentioned in 1040, as protospatharios and doux, when he was sent to southern Italy to assume command of the local Byzantine province as Catepan of Italy. Prior to that, he was apparently a member of George Maniakes' expeditionary force sent to conquer Sicily in 1038. Dokeianos arrived in the mainland in November 1040, and the situation he found was critical: his predecessor Nikephoros Dokeianos, probably a relative, had been killed in January at Ascoli in a mutiny of his troops, which was followed by a revolt in Taranto and the capture of the capital, Bari, by Argyrus, son of the Lombard leader Melus. Dokeianos hanged or blinded the ringleaders of the various revolts, but he failed to address the underlying cause, the widespread resentment at the oppressive taxation imposed by the Empire as part of the preparations for the Sicilian expedition under Maniakes. Dokeianos also offered the rule of strategic fortress of Melfi to the Milanese mercenary Arduin, with the title of topoteretes. Arduin had served under previous Byzantine commanders as part of a Norman contingent, but had been flogged in a dispute about the distribution of booty taken from the Muslims in Sicily (William of Apulia claims this was done by Dokeianos, but it is possible that it was done by one of his predecessors, perhaps George Maniakes). Arduin's grudge against the Byzantines now bore fruit. He sought the aid of the Normans who had been established at nearby Aversa since 1030, and received a contingent of 300 men, upon a promise to share his gains equally with them. Thus in March 1041 he and his men seized Melfi. The inhabitants initially opposed him, but eventually were won over by Arduin.

The rebels quickly extended their control over the neighbouring towns of Venosa, Ascoli, and Lavello. Dokeianos, who had just reimposed order in Bari and the surrounding region, marched to meet them with a hastily assembled and incomplete force: most of the imperial army was still in Sicily, so that Skylitzes writes that Dokeianos only took the Opsician and part of the Thracesian contingents with him, while other sources also add that his army comprised elements of the Varangian Guard. The two armies met at the Olivento river, where Dokeianos was defeated in a battle fought on 17 March. The rebels then moved south towards the coast, and on 4 May defeated another Byzantine force under Dokeianos in another battle near Cannae, a field that had served as the site for the famous battle of 216 BC and the first Norman engagement in southern Italy in 1018. The Annales Barenses claims, with obvious exaggeration, that 2,000 Normans defeated 18,000 Byzantines, but whatever the true numbers it does appear that the Byzantines considerably outnumbered the rebel forces. Dokeianos himself fell from his horse during the battle and was almost captured, until rescued by a squire. In the aftermath of the battle, both sides remained quiescent. The Lombards and Normans were probably exhausted and may have suffered heavy casualties, while the Byzantines regrouped: Dokeianos was recalled and replaced by Exaugustus Boioannes, while the garrisons in Sicily were withdrawn to the Italian mainland to face the rebel threat.

The withdrawal of the imperial forces from Sicily resulted in the rapid collapse of the imperial position there. Under Maniakes, the Byzantines had conquered the eastern portion of the island, but by 1042, only Messina remained in Byzantine hands. On the mainland, Boioannes did not fare better than his predecessor, as he was defeated and taken prisoner at the Battle of Montepeloso in September. This succession of defeats signalled the beginning of the end for Byzantine rule in southern Italy, a process which was completed three decades later with the fall of Bari to the Normans under Robert Guiscard.

=== In Thrace ===
Dokeianos re-appears in 1050, when he held the titles of patrikios and vestarches, as part of an imperial expedition against the Pechenegs who had revolted in Thrace. The imperial commander-in-chief, the eunuch praipositos Constantine, a militarily inexperienced court favourite of Emperor Constantine IX (r. 1042–55), listened to his advice on fortifying the army's encampment, but when the Pechenegs appeared before Adrianople, he refused to heed the opinion of the magistros Constantine Arianites to wait and attack the Pechenegs on their return journey, and instead marched to meet them in the open field of Basilike Libas, resulting in a devastating defeat: Arianites fell, while Dokeianos was taken prisoner. As he was brought before the Pecheneg leader, however, Dokeianos seized a sword from one of his guards and slashed at the leader, cutting off one of his arms, whereupon the enraged Pechenegs killed him and, according to Michael Attaleiates, opened his belly, cut off his arms and legs and placed them in it.

== Sources ==
- Chalandon, Ferdinand (1907). Histoire de la domination normande en Italie et en Sicile (in French). Paris: Paris, Librairie A. Picard et fils.
- Kaldellis, Anthony; Krallis, Dimitris, eds. (2012). The History - Michael Attaleiates. Cambridge, Mass.: Harvard University Press. ISBN 978-0-674-05799-9.
- Kazhdan, Alexander, ed. (1991). The Oxford Dictionary of Byzantium. Oxford and New York: Oxford University Press. ISBN 0-19-504652-8.
- Loud, Graham (2013). The Age of Robert Guiscard: Southern Italy and the Northern Conquest. New York: Routledge. ISBN 978-0-582-04529-3.
- Norwich, John Julius (1967). The Other Conquest. New York: Harper & Row.
- Ravegnani, Giorgio (2010). "MICHELE Dokeianos". Dizionario Biografico degli Italiani (in Italian). Vol. 74: Messi–Miraglia. Rome: Istituto dell'Enciclopedia Italiana. ISBN 978-88-12-00032-6.
- Varzos, Konstantinos (1984). Η Γενεαλογία των Κομνηνών [The Genealogy of the Komnenoi] (PDF) (in Greek). Vol. A1. Thessaloniki: Centre for Byzantine Studies, University of Thessaloniki.
- Wortley, John, ed. (2010). John Skylitzes: A Synopsis of Byzantine History, 811–1057. Cambridge: Cambridge University Press. ISBN 978-0-521-76705-7.

Preceded by Nikephoros Dokeianos	Catepan of Italy; 1040–1041	Succeeded by Exaugustus Boioannes
