= Yr rune =

Yr rune may be:

- ᛦ, a historical rune of the Younger Futhark, see Yr rune (Younger Futhark)
- ᚣ, a variant of the u rune to express the Old English /y/ phoneme in Anglo-Saxon runic manuscript tradition, see Ur (rune)
- a rune in the Armanen Futharkh of Guido von List
- a rune in the rune row of Karl Maria Wiligut
