= Atenulf, brother of Pandulf III of Benevento =

Atenulf was the son of Prince Landulf V of Benevento and brother of Prince Pandulf III. In 1040, Benevento still had the prestige of being the first of the independent Lombard principalities of the Mezzogiorno. So, when the Lombard Arduin, topoterites of Melfi, and his Norman mercenaries rebelled against Byzantine authority, they elected the brother of Pandulf as their leader, calling him "prince of Benevento."

After the assassination of the Catepan Nicephorus Doukeianos, the Normans planned to elect a leader from amongst their own, but William of Apulia notes that Atenulf had "perhaps given them gold or silver and thus led them to renege on a prior agreement." Thus was he elected leader.

On 3 September 1041, the rebels defeated the new Byzantine catepan, Exaugustus, the son of the great Boioannes, and took him captive. The catepan was taken captive to Benevento. At about that time, the prince of Salerno, Guaimar IV, began to draw the Normans under his banner with myriad promises. In February 1042, probably feeling abandoned, and perhaps bribed by the Greeks, Atenulf negotiated the ransom of Exaugustus and then fled with the ransom money to Greek territory, where he died in obscurity (but probably wealthy). He was replaced as leader by Argyrus.
