= Nikephoros Dokeianos =

Nikephoros Dokeianos (Greek: Νικηφόρος Δοκειανός, Italian: Nikeforo Dulchiano; died 1040) was the catepan of Italy from 1039 until 1040. He saw the early rebellion of Arduin the Lombard, but not its completion. He was killed at Ascoli Satriano early in 1040. With his death, the insurrection accelerated.

== Sources ==
- Chalandon, Ferdinand. Histoire de la domination normande en Italie et en Sicile. Paris, 1907.

Preceded by Michael Spondyles	Catepan of Italy; 1039–1040	Succeeded by Michael Dokeianos
