= Játvarðar Saga =

Icelandic saga about the life of English king Edward the Confessor

The Játvarðar Saga (in full Saga Játvarðar konungs hins helga) is an Icelandic saga about the life of Edward the Confessor, King of England (reigned 1042–1066). It was compiled in the 14th century, in Iceland, using a number of earlier English sources as well as the French Chronicon Universale Anonymi Laudunensis (or a source common with it). It was translated into English in 1894 by George Webbe Dasent. Among the various details contained in the saga, there is an account of the origin of an English colony in the Black Sea founded by one "Siward earl of Gloucester" (Sigurðr jarl af Glocestr), a refugee from the Norman Conquest of England.

== Historical Importance ==
The Jatvardar Saga is a 14th century production that is situated in the Anglicization of Iceland. The 14th century was a period of significant religious and cultural change in Iceland. Discussed below is the Icelandic context relevant to the saga. The Jatvardar Saga could be warning from the church against improper piety practiced by the elite magnates of Iceland, according to historian Nicole Marafioti. Edward the Confessor is an English monarch who may have been used persuasively in favor of Anglicization. Below is both the context relevant to Iceland, and the context relevant to the Saga including England.

== Post-Norman Conquest and Anglo-Saxon Migration to Byzantium ==
The Anglo-Saxon migration was prompted by the Norman Conquest and the unwillingness of a group of English noblemen to accept their new ruler after Edward's death. According to the Icelandic author of Jatvardar saga, some Anglo-Saxons were determined that they did not want to live under William's rule following the Norman Conquest. In response they fled the country, being led by 3 earls, 8 barons, 350 ships and just as many people. Similar events are foretold in the Chronicon Laudunensis giving reason to believe that this event did truly happen. The migration began taking place by this Anglo-Saxon group around the year 1066, the same year that William would take control of England.

=== The Varangian Guard ===
Prior to reaching Byzantium the group was aware that they needed to work to survive in this new land. Furthermore, based on the cultural and trade links between England and Scandinavia, many Anglo-Saxons were likely aware of the Varangian Guard and opportunities it presented. Prior to 1066 a majority of members of the Varangian Guard were of Scandinavian descent. After the Norman Conquest of England that trend began to shift, and by the 1070's, the Varangian Guard became predominantly English. The Varangian Guard can be viewed in two different manners, the first being a distinct group of soldiers set to serve the emperors of Byzantium, the other is to view them as a group of peoples. At one point a majority of the Guard consisted of Anglo-Saxons and many of the others Scandinavians, all outsiders of the kingdom. This position thusly conjoined the two into a single entity or group of people. Furthermore, during this time there was a large amount of Scandinavians in England causing the two to be viewed in likeness to one another. The Varangian Guard prior to 1066 was commonly viewed as Scandinavians who travelled to Byzantium to serve in the emperor’s bodyguard, generally referred to as Varangians. Scandinavians have been present in the imperial service as early as the mid-9th century. and were only replaced after the Norman invasion of England in 1066 where more large groups of Anglo-Saxons began to enter the Varangian Guard. “From the 1070’s onwards, the Varangian Guard became predominantly English,” becoming a majority within the Guard within years.

== Historical Figures ==
The saga focuses on historical figures such as Edward the Confessor, Harold Godwinson, William of Normandy primarily but features several others. Figures such as Mathilda of Flanders, Saint Dunstan, Saint Becket, Earl of Godwine, and King Cnut all being featured or referenced briefly. The use of historical figures, such as Saint Dunstan and Becket, has been used by historians like Nichole Marafioti as support that the saga was written as a political piece of writing in support of the church and clergy.

=== Edward the Confessor ===
Edward the Confessor (c. 1003 – 5 January 1066) was an Anglo-Saxon English king and saint. Usually considered the last king of the House of Wessex, he ruled from 1042 until his death in 1066. Although the four sections of the Játvarðar Saga are focused on different subject matter, the saga is primarily focused on Edward himself with the first two sections being devoted mostly to Edward. The first contains a small genealogy of Edward in addition to his saintly characteristics, then moves on to legends of William of Normandy’s parentage and marriage to Mathilda of Flanders. The second contains material on Edward’s government and moves onto a description of Edward’s miracles, such as his vision of the Danish king drowning as he came to invade England, Edward giving of his ring to a pilgrim that turns out to have been St. John the Evangelist, a vision of one of the sleepers of the Evangelist, another vision of the sacrament as the body of Christ, and a description of two miracles of healing Edward conducted. The last two sections deviate from a focus on Edward, instead mostly concerning themselves with English History with Edward's only direct involvement in these last two sections being a description of Edward's death with the rest focusing on the aftermath.

=== William of Normandy ===
William the Conqueror (c. 1028 – 9 September 1087), sometimes called William the Bastard, was the first Norman king of England (as William I), reigning from 1066 until his death. A descendant of Rollo, he was Duke of Normandy (as William II) from 1035 onward. By 1060, following a long struggle, his hold on Normandy was secure. In 1066, following the death of Edward the Confessor, William invaded England, leading a Franco-Norman army to victory over the Anglo-Saxon forces of Harold Godwinson at the Battle of Hastings, and suppressed subsequent English revolts in what has become known as the Norman Conquest. Although the Játvarðar Saga is primarily focused on Edward, William can be argued to be the second most prominent figure in the saga, with his genealogy being described in the first section alongside Edward in addition to his conquest of England and the results of his rule being the central topics of the third and fourth sections.

=== Harold Godwinson ===
Harold Godwinson (c. 1022 – 14 October 1066), also called Harold II, was the last crowned Anglo-Saxon King of England. Harold reigned from 6 January 1066 until his death at the Battle of Hastings on 14 October 1066, the decisive battle of the Norman Conquest. He was succeeded by William the Conqueror, the victor at Hastings. Harold Godwinson was a member of the most powerful noble family in England, his father Godwin having been made Earl of Wessex by Cnut the Great and he was the brother-in-law of Edward the Confessor through his marriage to Edith of Wessex. Although the Játvarðar Saga is primarily focused on Edward, Harold is still a prominent figure in the saga with his establishment as king of England and the Battle of Hastings being described throughout the third section.

== Synopsis ==
The most widely available version of the Jatvardar is George Webbe Dasent's translation. The following synopsis is based wholly on Dasent’s work.

=== Genealogy ===
The saga begins with the genealogy of Edward the Confessor and William the Bastard. First, Edward is proclaimed the saint king and the son of Ethelred. He was a pious figure who enjoyed praying and visiting cloisters in his youth. Edward took Holy Mary as his Lady, Peter the Apostle as his father, and John the Evangelist as his guardian, and used them as guides. Edward’s piety extended into his three marriages where he convinced his three wives to remain virgin. Next, the saga focuses on William the Bastard before the Norman Invasion. After William became the Duke of Normandy he married Matilda, daughter to the Count of Flanders.

=== Hagiography ===
The second section highlights a few of Edward’s visions and miracles. In the first vision, when attending a mass at the Church of Peter at Westminster, Edward saw the death of the Danish King (unspecified) who came to invade England. In the next vision, Edward saw St. John the Evangelist as a pilgrim who sought out Edward asking for a gift. It was confirmed to have been St. John when the gift was sent back to Edward by St. John. After this, Edward has another Vision at Westminster that the Seven Sleepers on the Caelian Hill had rolled onto their left side after 200 years. In the Church of Peter was Edwards first miracle; he healed a person who was unable to walk and paralyzed. Later back at Edward’s lodging, he performed another miracle, curing the blindness of multiple men.

=== Norman Conquest ===
The third section focuses on the Norman Conquest of England and the death of Edward. When Edward’s brother dies, Edward is inspired to name and heir. Edward names William the Bastard to be the next English king after his death. Next, while Edward was on his deathbed his wish for William to become the English king was ignored by Harold. Harold took the English crown for himself. When William is informed about Edward’s death and Harolds ascension, he begins his invasion plans of England, starting the Norman Conquest. At the Battle of Hastings, Harold is defeated. Although Harold wasn’t executed, he was exiled, and William became the English king.

=== Byzantine Emigration ===
The final section of the Jatvardar refers to the migration of English nobles to Byzantium under William’s rule. This series of events is also referred to as the Anglo-Saxon migration to Byzantium, prompted by the Norman Conquest and unwillingness of a group of English noblemen to accept their new ruler, William, after the death of Edward. In response, a group of English nobles, unhappy with William’s reign began to migrate to the Mediterranean after learning that the Danish King, Cnut, wouldn't conquer England. These Anglo-Saxon men, women and children along their journeys attacked numerous cities, slaying the men but also acquiring large amounts of gold and silver to supplement their journey and ambitions. Later arriving in Sicily, Italy, the group became known of issues occurring in a city named Micklegarth. This city was run by the Byzantine Emperor Kirijalax and the Englishmen saw an opportunity to gain favor with the emperor. The Englishmen for a long time had heard of “the Northmen (who) had very great honor who went into service there,” and they were inspired to do the same. After defeating this group, the Englishmen met with the emperor who thanked them for their victory and asked of the emperor to let them reside in Micklegarth. Emperor Kirijalax agreed and soon the English nobles settled in Micklegarth, becoming further acquainted with the Byzantine Emperor. When Emperor Kirijalax took the Byzantine throne, he requested help from the migrants, offering them their own dominion on the Black Sea. The saga ends promptly after that.

== Analysis of Saga ==
The relevance and relation of the saga to hagiographies has been under debate by historians. Nicole Marafioti, mentioned above, describes the saga as “patchwork,” for its use of numerous unconfirmed sources and blending of styles that indicate that the saga was written in the 14th century. Gabrielle Turville-Peter, an English philologist who specialized in Old Norse studies, has made the widely respected analysis that those Icelandic clerics and scholar who wrote hagiographical pieces of work such as Icelandic sagas wrote in the interest of ecclesiastical and secular powers. Marafioti believes that the deviations in writing style in comparison to other examples of Old Norse hagiographical writings saga, with the text focusing extensively on political history and lacking the hallmarks of hagiographical literature, indicate that this saga was written to provide a model of lay piety that supported the church and clergy for Icelandic magistrates to follow during the 13th or 14th century instead of devotional text. Tamar Drukker, another Icelandic Historian, believes the saga while containing some hagiographic motifs, isn’t When compared to literary narratives like Brut, Drukker notes that the Jatvardar doesn't The potentially confusing structure and focus of the Jatvardar has led several historians like Drukker and Marafioti to question purpose of the saga.
