= Varangian Guard =

Elite unit of the Byzantine Army

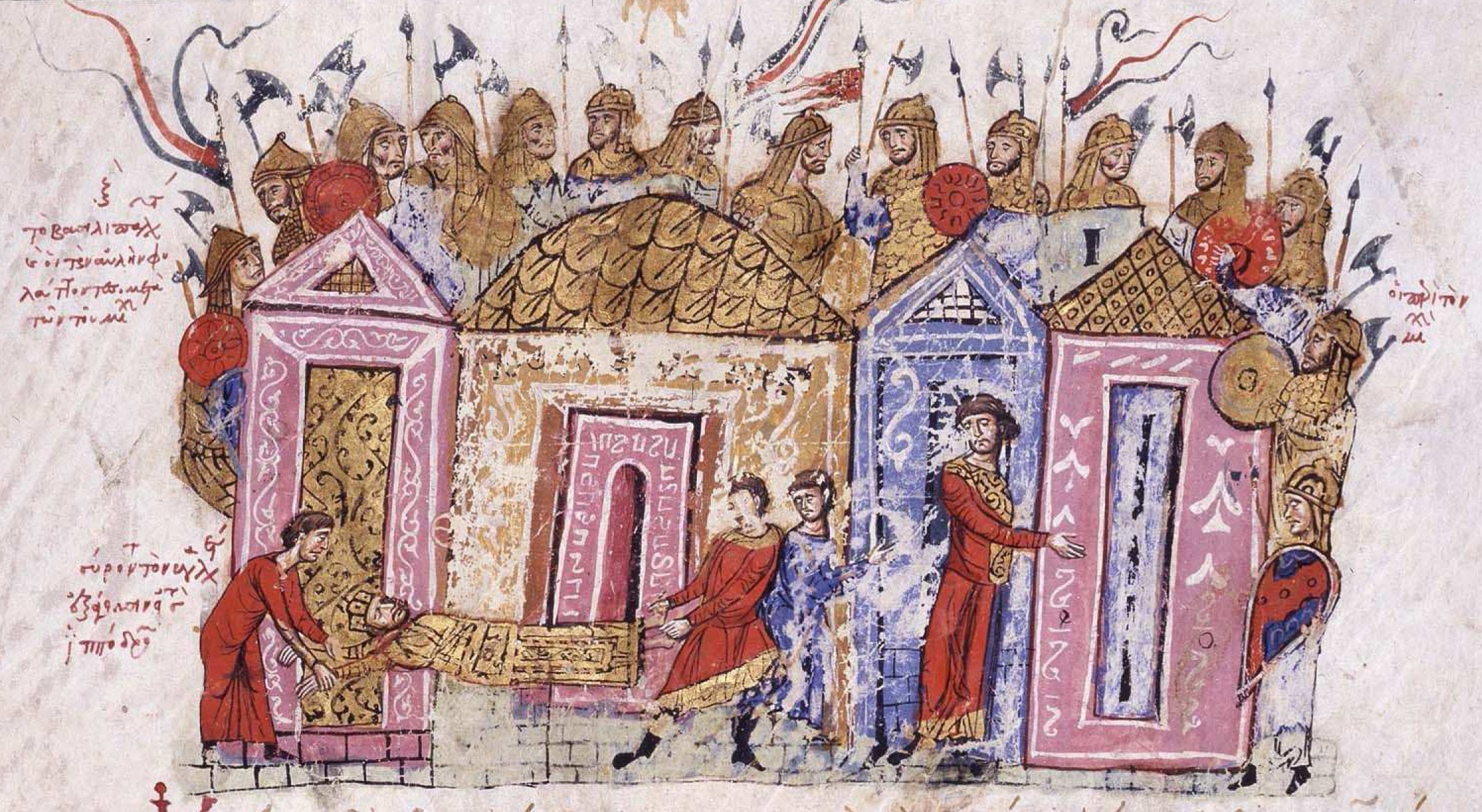
Depiction of the Varangian Guard (above) in the 11th century chronicle of John Skylitzes

The Varangian Guard (Greek: Τάγμα τῶν Βαράγγων, romanized: Tágma tōn Varángōn) was an elite unit of the Byzantine army from the 10th to the 14th century who served as personal bodyguards to the Byzantine emperors. The Varangian Guard was known for being primarily composed of recruits from Northern Europe, including mainly Norsemen from Scandinavia but also Anglo-Saxons from England. The recruitment of distant fighters from outside Byzantium to serve as the emperor's personal guard was pursued as a deliberate policy, as they lacked local political loyalties and could be counted upon to suppress revolts by disloyal Byzantine factions.

The Rus' provided the earliest members of the Varangian Guard. They were in Byzantine service from as early as 874. The Guard was first formally constituted under Emperor Basil II in 988, following the Christianization of Kievan Rus' by Vladimir I of Kiev. Vladimir, who had recently taken control of Kiev with an army of Varangian warriors, sent 6,000 men to Basil as part of a military assistance agreement. Basil's distrust of the native Byzantine guardsmen, whose loyalties often shifted with fatal consequences, as well as the proven loyalty of the Varangians, many of whom had previously served in Byzantium, led the Emperor to employ them as his personal guardsmen.

Immigrants from Scandinavia (predominantly Sweden, but also Denmark and Norway) gave an almost entirely Norse composition to the organization until the late 11th century. During these years, Swedish men left to enlist in the Byzantine Varangian Guard in such numbers that a medieval Swedish law, Västgötalagen, from Västergötland declared no one could inherit while staying in "Greece"—then the Scandinavian term for the Byzantine Empire—to stop the emigration, especially as two other European courts simultaneously also recruited Scandinavians: Kievan Rus' c. 980–1060 and London 1013–1051 (the Þingalið).

Composed primarily of Norsemen and Rus' for the first 100 years, the Guard began to see increased numbers of Anglo-Saxons after the Norman conquest of England. By the time of the Emperor Alexios Komnenos in the late 11th century, the Varangian Guard was largely recruited from Anglo-Saxons and "others who had suffered at the hands of the Vikings and their cousins the Normans". The Anglo-Saxons and other Germanic peoples shared with the Vikings a tradition of faithful (to death if necessary) oath-bound service, and the Norman invasion of England resulted in many fighting men looking for positions elsewhere after having lost their lands and former masters.

The Varangian Guard not only provided security for the Byzantine emperors, but also participated in many wars, often playing a decisive role, since they were usually deployed at critical moments of a battle. By the late 13th century, Varangians were mostly ethnically assimilated by the Byzantine Greeks, though the Guard remained in existence until at least mid-14th century. In 1400, there were still people identifying themselves as "Varangians" in Constantinople. In 1453, up to 3,000 Varangians remained in the city. Together with their Byzantine Greek brethren, they fought in a last stand against the Ottoman Turks in the Fall of Constantinople.

== History ==
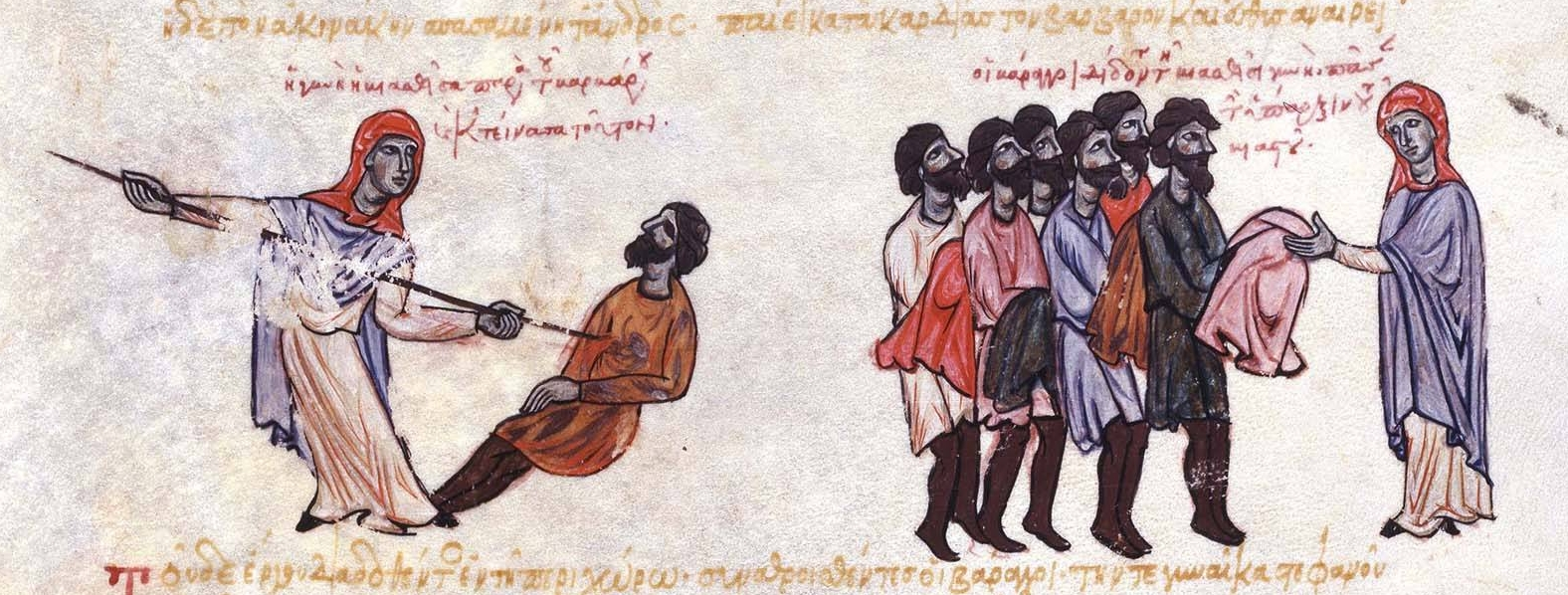
An illumination of a scene from the Skylitzes Chronicle, depicting a Thracesian woman killing a Varangian who tried to rape her, whereupon his comrades praised her and gave her his possessions.

The earliest members of the Varangian Guard came from Kievan Rus'. A treaty between Rus' and the Byzantine empire under Basil I was agreed in 874 after a period of hostilities. A clause in the treaty obliged Rus' to provide men for Byzantine service. Renewed hostilities between 907 and 911 ended with a new treaty under which any Rus' who chose could serve Byzantium as a right.

The scholarly consensus is that the Rus' people originated in what is currently coastal eastern Sweden around the eighth century and that their name has the same origin as Roslagen in Sweden (with the older name being Roden). According to the prevalent theory, the name Rus', like the Proto-Finnic name for Sweden (*Roocci), is derived from an Old Norse term for "the men who row" (rods-) as rowing was the main method of navigating the rivers of Eastern Europe.

As early as 911, Varangians are mentioned as fighting as mercenaries for the Byzantines. About 700 Varangians served along with Dalmatians as marines in Byzantine naval expeditions against the Emirate of Crete in 902 and a force of 629 returned to Crete under Constantine Porphyrogenitus in 949. A unit of 415 Varangians was involved in the Italian expedition of 936. It is also recorded that there were Varangian contingents among the forces that fought the Arabs in Syria in 955. During this period, the Varangian mercenaries were included in the Great Companions (Gk. Μεγάλη Εταιρεία).

In 988, Basil II requested military assistance from Vladimir I of Kiev to help defend his throne. In compliance with the treaty made by his father after the Siege of Dorostolon (971), Vladimir sent 6,000 men to Basil. Vladimir took the opportunity to rid himself of his most unruly warriors, whom in any case he was unable to pay. This is the presumptive date for the formal, permanent institution of an elite guard. In exchange for the warriors, Vladimir was given Basil's sister, Anna, in marriage. Vladimir also agreed to convert to Christianity and to bring his people into the Christian faith.

In 989, these Varangians, led by Basil II himself, landed at Chrysopolis to defeat the rebel general Bardas Phokas. On the field of battle, Phokas died of a stroke in full view of his opponent; upon the death of their leader, Phokas' troops turned and fled. The brutality of the Varangians was noted when they pursued the fleeing army and "cheerfully hacked them to pieces".

These men formed the nucleus of the Varangian Guard, which saw extensive service in southern Italy in the eleventh century, as the Normans and Lombards worked to extinguish Byzantine authority there. In 1018, Basil II received a request from his catepan of Italy, Basil Boioannes, for reinforcements to put down the Lombard revolt of Melus of Bari. A detachment of the Varangian Guard was sent and in the Battle of Cannae, the Byzantines achieved a decisive victory.

The Varangians also participated in the partial reconquest of Sicily from the Arabs under George Maniakes in 1038. Here, they fought alongside Normans recently arrived in Italy seeking adventure and Lombards from Byzantine-held Apulia. A prominent member of the Guard at this time was Harald Hardrada, later King of Norway as Harald III (1046–1066). However, when Maniakes ostracised the Lombards by publicly humiliating their leader, Arduin, the Lombards deserted and the Normans and Varangians followed them.

Not long after, the catepan Michael Doukeianos had a force of Varangians stationed at Bari. On 16 March 1041, they were called up to fight the Normans near Venosa; many drowned in the subsequent retreat across the Ofanto. In September, Exaugustus Boioannes was sent to Italy with only a small contingent of Varangians to replace the disgraced Doukeianos. On 3 September 1041, they were defeated in battle by the Normans.

Many of the last catepans were sent from Constantinople with Varangian units. In 1047, John Raphael was sent to Bari with a contingent of Varangians, but the Bariots refused to receive his troops and he spent his term at Otranto. Twenty years later, in 1067, the last Byzantine catepan in southern Italy, Mabrica, arrived with Varangian auxiliaries and took Brindisi and Taranto. At the disastrous Battle of Manzikert in 1071, virtually all the Emperor's Guards fell around him.

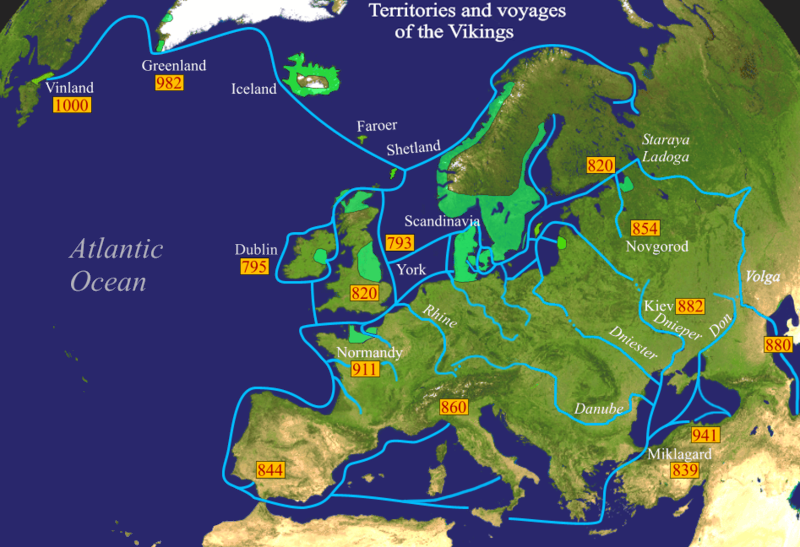
Viking expeditions (blue line): depicting the immense breadth of their voyages through most of Europe, the Mediterranean Sea, Northern Africa, Asia Minor, the Arctic, and North America. Lower Normandy, depicted as a ″Viking territory in 911″, was not part of the lands granted by the king of the Franks to Rollo in 911, but Upper Normandy.

Composed primarily of Scandinavians for the first 100 years, the guard began to see increasing numbers of Anglo-Saxons after the successful invasion of England by the Normans. In 1088, a large number of Anglo-Saxons and Danes emigrated to the Byzantine Empire by way of the Mediterranean. One source has more than 5,000 of them arriving in 235 ships. Those who did not enter imperial service settled on the Black Sea coast, building and garrisoning the town of Helenopolis for Alexios I. Those who did became so vital to the Varangians that the Guard was commonly called the Englinbarrangoi (Anglo-Varangians) from that point. In this capacity, they fought in Sicily against the Normans under Robert Guiscard, who unsuccessfully sought to invade the lower Balkans as well.

Writing about the unit as it was in 1080, the chronicler and princess Anna Komnene refers to these "axe-bearing barbarians" as being "from Thule", likely a reference to the British Isles or Scandinavia. Likewise, the Byzantine civil-servant, soldier and historian John Kinnamos calls these "axe-bearers" that guarded the Emperor "the British nation, which has been in service to the Romans' Emperors from a long time back". Kinnamos was writing in the later 12th century, indicating perhaps that the more Dane and Saxon composition of the guard continued to the point of the Fourth Crusade.

After the end of the Norwegian Crusade led by the Norwegian King Sigurd I Magnusson, the guard had an influx of Norwegian Warriors. The Norwegian King sold his ships in Constantinople and returned to Norway with only 100 men, out of an original army of around 6,000.

The Varangians relied on the broad-bladed Dane axe as their main weapon, although they were often also skilled swordsmen or archers. In some sources, such as Anna Komnene's The Alexiad, they are described as mounted; both Vikings and elite Anglo-Saxon warriors routinely used horses for strategic mobility even though they normally fought on foot. The guard was stationed primarily around Constantinople, and may have been barracked in the Bucoleon palace complex. The guard also accompanied armies into the field, and Byzantine chroniclers (as well as several notable Western European and Arab chroniclers) often note their battlefield prowess, especially in comparison to the local barbarian peoples. They were vital to the Byzantine victory under the emperor John II Komnenos at the Battle of Beroia in 1122. The Varangians hacked their way through the enemy's circle of Pecheneg wagons, collapsing the Pecheneg position and causing a general rout in their camp.

The Varangians were described by 11th-century Byzantine historian Michael Psellus as thus: "The whole group carry shields and brandish on their shoulders a certain single-edged, heavy-iron weapon", which is understood to have been the Dane axe (many Byzantine writers referred to them as "axe-bearing barbarians", pelekyphoroi barbaroi, rather than as Varangians). However, a mistranslation of the Greek text has led some to refer to the weapon as a rhomphaia, which most likely occurred as a product of Atticism in Byzantine literature.

They were prominent in the defence of Constantinople during the Fourth Crusade. Of the role of the guard, it is said that "the fighting was very violent and there was hand to hand fight with axes and swords, the assailants mounted the walls and prisoners were taken on both sides". The latest mention of the Varangian guard is in the Greek version of the Chronicle of the Morea, which states that this unit escorted the Prince of Achaia away to prison after the Battle of Pelagonia in 1259; historian D. J. Geanakoplos suggests they were reconstituted by Theodore I Laskaris to strengthen his claim as the rightful Emperor. Occasional mentions of the Varangians continued up until to the 1400s, with them still described as "Varangians with their axes" guarding the keys to any city where the emperor was staying in 1329. People identified as Varangians were to be found in Constantinople around 1400.

== Function ==
The duties and purpose of the Varangian Guard were similar—if not identical—to the services provided by the Kievan druzhina, the Swedish/Norwegian hird, and the Scandinavian and Anglo-Saxon housecarls. The Varangians served as the personal bodyguard of the emperor, swearing an oath of loyalty to him; they had ceremonial duties as retainers and acclaimers and performed some police duties, especially in cases of treason and conspiracy. They were headed by a separate officer, the akolouthos, who was usually a native Byzantine.

The Varangian Guard was only used in battle during critical moments, or where the battle was most fierce. Contemporary Byzantine chroniclers note with a mix of terror and fascination that the "Scandinavians were frightening both in appearance and in equipment, they attacked with reckless rage and neither cared about losing blood nor their wounds". The description probably refers to berserkers, since this state of trance is said to have given them superhuman strength and no sense of pain from their wounds. According to the 13th-century Icelandic chronicler Snorri Sturluson, when the Byzantine Emperor died, the Varangians had the unique right of running to the imperial treasury and taking as much gold and as many gems as they could carry, a procedure known in Old Norse as polutasvarf ("palace pillaging"). This privilege, says Sturluson, enabled many Varangians to return home as wealthy men, which encouraged even more Scandinavians to enlist in the Guard in Miklagarðr (Swedish = Miklagård = 'The Great City', i.e. Constantinople). However, polutasvarf is not mentioned in Byzantine sources and modern historians doubt its veracity.

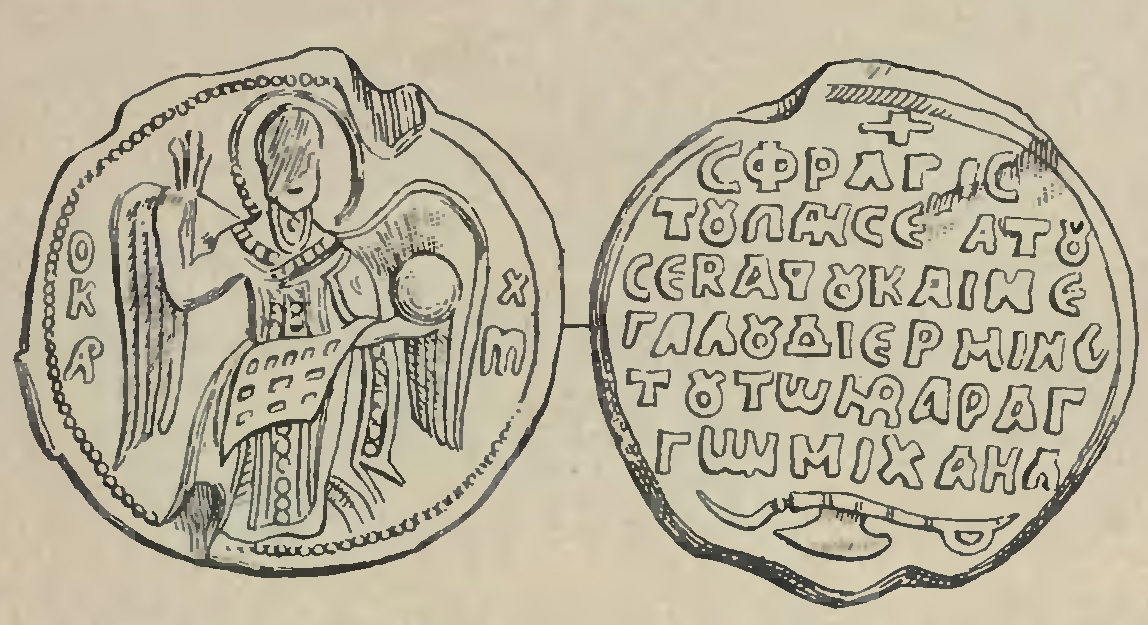
Seal of Michael, Grand Interpreter (megas diermeneutes) of the Guard

The loyalty of the Varangians became a trope of Byzantine writers. Writing about her father Alexius's seizing of the Imperial throne in 1081, Anna Komnene notes that he was advised not to attack the Varangians who still guarded the Emperor Nikephoros for the Varangians "regard loyalty to the emperors and the protection of their persons as a family tradition, a kind of sacred trust". This allegiance, she noted, "they preserve inviolate, and will never brook the slighted hint of betrayal". Unlike the native Byzantine guards so mistrusted by Basil II, the Varangian guards' loyalties lay with the position of Emperor, not the man who sat on the throne. This was made clear in 969 when the guards failed to avenge the death by assassination of Emperor Nikephoros II. A servant had managed to call for the guards while the Emperor was being attacked, but when they arrived he was dead. They immediately knelt before John Tzimiskes, Nikephoros' murderer and hailed him as Emperor. "Alive they would have defended him to the last breath: dead there was no point in avenging him. They had a new master now."

This reputation exceeds the truth in at least two recorded instances. In 1071, after Emperor Romanos IV Diogenes was defeated by Sultan Alp Arslan, a palace coup was staged before he could return to Constantinople. Caesar John Doukas used the Varangian guard to depose the absent emperor, arrest Empress Eudoxia, and proclaim his nephew, stepson of Diogenes Michael VII, as emperor. Thus, instead of defending their absent emperor, the Varangians were used by the usurpers—proving their loyalty to the throne, if not always the current occupier of that throne. In a more sinister episode, the historian Joannes Zonaras reports the guard revolting against Nikephoros III Botaneiates after the blinding of the general Nikephoros Bryennios in 1078, "planning to kill him" but being suppressed by loyal troops. They subsequently asked for and received a pardon.

== Runestones ==
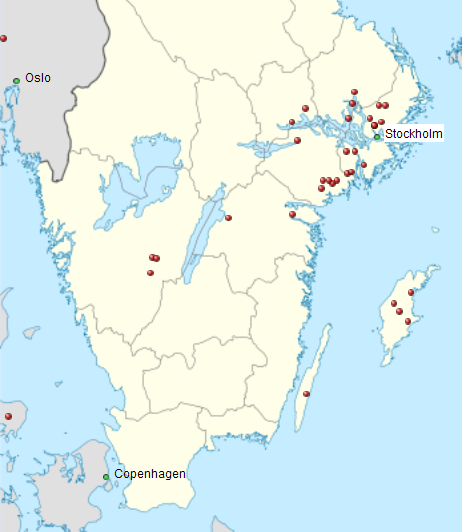
Map of geographic distribution of Varangian Runestones (almost all are found in present-day Sweden).

There are a number of raised stone memorials called runestones throughout Scandinavia. The runestones are unevenly distributed in Scandinavia: Denmark has 250 runestones, Norway has 50 while Iceland has none. Sweden has as many as between 1,700 and 2,500 depending on definition. The Swedish district of Uppland has the highest concentration with as many as 1,196 inscriptions in stone, whereas Södermanland is second with 391. Many date to the Viking Age, and there are many associated with the Varangian Guards.

These Varangian runestones commemorate various fallen warriors through carved runes, and mention voyages to the East (Austr) or the Eastern route (Austrvegr), or to more specific eastern locations such as Garðaríki (what is today Russia and Ukraine). The losses that the Varangian Guard suffered are reflected by the largest group of runestones that talk of foreign voyages, such as those termed the Greece Runestones. These were raised by former members of the Varangian Guard, or in their memory. A smaller group consists of the four Italy Runestones which were raised in memory of members of the Varangian Guard who died in southern Italy.

The oldest of the Greece runestones are six stones in the style RAK, a style which is dated to the period before 1015 AD. The group consists of Skepptuna runestone U 358, Västra Ledinge runestone U 518, Nälberga runestone Sö 170 and Eriksstad runestone Sm 46.

One of the more notable of the later runestones in the style Pr4 is Ed runestone U 112, a large boulder at the western shore of the lake of Ed. It tells that Ragnvaldr, the captain of the Varangian Guard, had returned home where he had the inscriptions made in memory of his dead mother.

The youngest runestones, in the style Pr5, such as Ed runestone U 104 (presently in the Ashmolean Museum in Oxford), are dated to the period 1080–1130, after which runestones became unfashionable.

The Varangians did not return home without being imprinted by Byzantine culture in one way or another, as exemplified by the Byzantine cross carved on the early eleventh century Risbyle runestone U 161, and which today is the coat-of-arms of Täby, a trimunicipal locality and the seat of Täby Municipality in Stockholm County, Sweden. The runes were made by the Viking Ulf of Borresta, see Orkesta runestone U 344, in memory of another Ulf, in Skålhamra, and at the request of the latter's father.

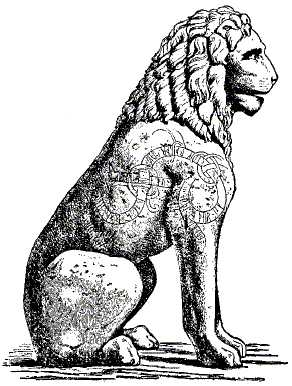
Piraeus Lion drawing of curved lindworm. The runes on the lion tell of Swedish warriors, likely Varangians, mercenaries in the service of the Byzantine (Eastern Roman) Emperor.

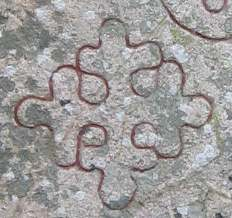
The Byzantine cross, on U 161, a cross which is today the coat of arms of the municipality of Täby, Sweden

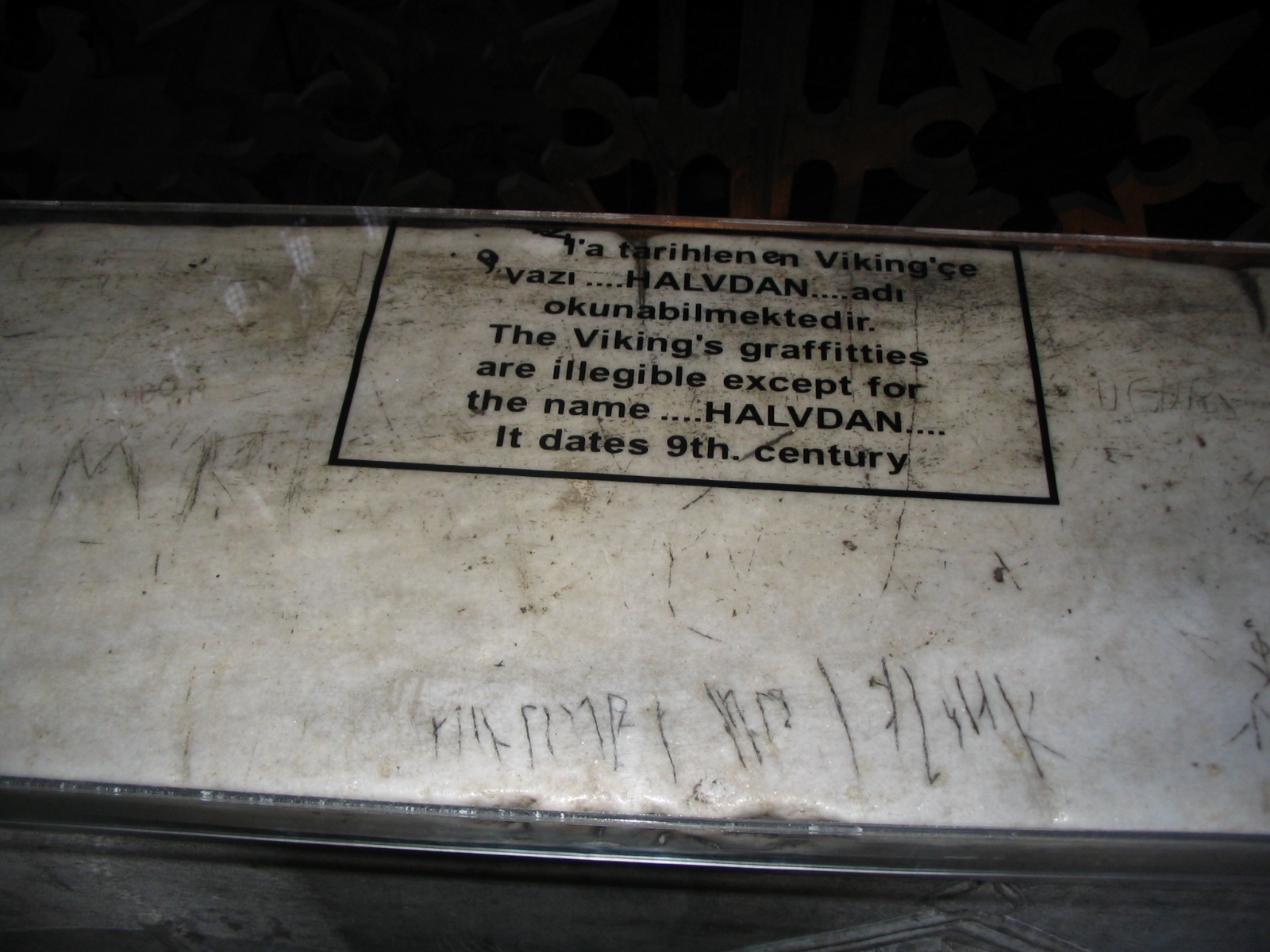
One of the runic inscriptions in Hagia Sophia, probably carved by members of the Varangian Guard

== Norse sagas ==
According to the sagas, the West Norse entered the service of the Guard considerably later than the East Norse. According to the Laxdœla saga, the Icelander Bolli Bollason (born c. 1006) was the first known Icelander in the Varangian Guard. Travelling to Constantinople via Denmark, he spent many years in the Varangian Guard, "and was thought to be the most valiant in all deeds that try a man, and always went next to those in the forefront." The saga also records the finery his followers received from the Emperor, and the influence he held after his return to Iceland:

Bolli rode from the ship with twelve men, and all his followers were dressed in scarlet, and rode on gilt saddles, and all were they a trusty band, though Bolli was peerless among them. He had on the clothes of fur which the Garth-king had given him, he had over all a scarlet cape; and he had Footbiter girt on him, the hilt of which was dight with gold, and the grip woven with gold, he had a gilded helmet on his head, and a red shield on his flank, with a knight painted on it in gold. He had a dagger in his hand, as is the custom in foreign lands; and whenever they took quarters the women paid heed to nothing but gazing at Bolli and his grandeur, and that of his followers.

The Varangian Guard is mentioned also in Njal's Saga in reference to Kolskegg—an Icelander said to have come first to Holmgard (Novgorod) and then on to Miklagard (Constantinople), where he entered the Emperor's service. "The last that was heard of him was, that he had wedded a wife there, and was captain over the Varangians, and stayed there till his death day."

One of the members of the Varangian Guard was the future king Harald Sigurdsson III of Norway, known as Harald Hardråde ("Hard-ruler"). Having fled his homeland, Harald went first to Gardariki and then on to Constantinople, where he arrived in 1035. He participated in eighteen battles and during his service fought against Arabs in Anatolia and Sicily under General George Maniakes, as well as in southern Italy and Bulgaria. An extensive account of Harald Sigurdsson's journeys is found in Harald Sigurdsson's Saga.

During his time in the Varangian Guard Harald earned the titles of manglavites and spatharokandidatos. But his service ended with his imprisonment for misappropriation of imperial plunder taken during his command. He was released upon the dethronement of the Emperor Michael V, and saga sources suggest he was the one sent to blind the Emperor when he and his uncle fled to the church of the Stoudios Monastery and clung to the altar.

Harald then sought to leave his post, but was denied this. He eventually escaped and returned home in 1043, becoming King of Norway before eventually dying at the Battle of Stamford Bridge while invading England in 1066.

The Varangian Guard regained some of its old Scandinavian flavour when Harald Hardråde's grandson, Sigurd I of Norway, went on the Norwegian Crusade to the Holy Land. After fighting battles against the Muslims, King Sigurd in 1110 let the rest of his force, who originally numbered 6,000 men, join the Varangian Guard. King Sigurd returned home with fewer than a hundred of his personal Guard.

Most of the Old Norse narratives which deals with Norwegians or Icelanders in the Varangian Guard are from the 13th century, and bear witness to a continued interest and generally positive views towards Byzantium within the West Norse cultural area.

== See also ==
- Byzantine army
- Byzantine bureaucracy
- Count Robert of Paris
- Druzhina
- German Guard
- Harald Hardrada
- Hird
- Housecarl
- Komnenian army
- Leidang
- Mamluk
- Manglabites
- New England (medieval)
- Optimatoi
- Piraeus Lion
- Swedes (Germanic tribe)
- Thingmen
- Trade route from the Varangians to the Greeks
- Varangian runestones
- Västgötalagen

== General bibliography ==
=== Primary sources ===
- Alexiad by Anna Komnena
- Chronicon universale anonymi Laudunensis
- Deeds of John and Manuel Comnenus by John Kinnamos
- Heimskringla
- Historia ecclesiastica by Ordericus Vitalis
- Játvarðar Saga
- Laxdœla saga
- Strategikon of Kekaumenos by Kekaumenos

=== Secondary sources ===
- Buckler, Georgina. Anna Komnena: A Study. Oxford: University Press, 1929.
- Blondal, Sigfus. Varangians of Byzantium: An Aspect of Byzantine Military History. Trans. by Benedikt S. Benedikz, Cambridge: 1978. ISBN 0-521-21745-8.
- D'Amato, Raffaele. The Varangian Guard 988–1453. Osprey Publishing, 2010. ISBN 1849081794.
- Davidson, H. R. Ellis. The Viking Road to Byzantium. London: 1976. ISBN 0-04-940049-5.
- Enoksen, Lars Magnar. (1998). Runor: historia, tydning, tolkning. Historiska Media, Falun. ISBN 91-88930-32-7.
- Jansson, Sven B. (1980). Runstenar. STF, Stockholm. ISBN 91-7156-015-7.
- Jakobsson, Sverrir (2008). "The Schism that never was: Old Norse views on Byzantium and Russia". Byzantinoslavica. Slovanský ústav Akademie věd ČR, v. v. i. and Euroslavica. pp. 173–88.
- Jakobsson, Sverrir, The Varangians: In God's Holy Fire (Palgrave Macmillan, 2020), ISBN 978-3-030-53796-8
- Theotokis, Georgios. "Rus, Varangian and Frankish Mercenaries in the Service of the Byzantine Emperors (9th–11th c.). Numbers, Organisation and Battle Tactics in the operational theatres of Asia Minor and the Balkans". Byzantine Symmeikta, vol. 22, Athens: 2012. ISSN 1105-1639
