= Exaugustus Boioannes =

Exaugustus Boiοannes (Italian: Exaugusto Bugiano, Greek: Εξακουστός Βοϊωάννης, fl. 1041), son of the famous Basil Boioannes, was also a catepan of Italy, from 1041 to 1042. He replaced Michael Dokeianos after the latter's disgrace in defeat at Montemaggiore on May 4. Boioannes did not have the levies and reinforcements that Doukeianos had had at his command. He arrived only with a Varangian contingent. Boioannes decided on trying to isolate the Lombard rebels in Melfi by camping near Montepeloso.

According to William of Apulia, prior to battle Exaugustus made a speech to the troops as follows:

Lads, have pride in your manhood, and don't allow yourselves to have the hearts of women! What cowardice makes you always run away? Remember your forefathers whose courage made the whole world subject to them. Hector, the bravest of men, fell before the arms of Achilles. Troy was reduced to flames by the Grecian fury. India knew of the gallantry of Philip. Did not his son Alexander through his bravery make the strongest of kingdoms submit to the Greeks? The west and indeed every part of the world was once in fear of us. What people, hearing the name of the Greeks, dared to stand before them in the field? Towns, fortresses and cities could scarcely render their enemies safe from their power. Be valiant, I pray you, remember the courage of your ancestors, and don't disgrace them by placing your trust in your feet [alone]! He who dares to fight like a man will overcome the strength of the enemy. Try to follow in the footsteps of your ancestors, and abandon now any idea of flight. All the world should know that you are men of courage. One should not fear the Frankish people in battle, for they are inferior both in numbers and in courage.

The Normans, however, sortied from Melfi and camped on the Monte Siricolo, near Montepeloso. They captured a convoy of livestock meant for the Greek camp and forced a battle, in which Boioannes was defeated and captured (September 3, 1041). The Normans, as mere mercenaries, turned the captive catepan over to the Lombard leader Atenulf in Benevento. The latter accepted a large payment in return for the catepan's liberation and promptly kept the entire ransom for himself. Boioannes was free, but not in command any longer.

== Sources ==
- Chalandon, Ferdinand. Histoire de la domination normande en Italie et en Sicile. Paris, 1907.
- Norwich, John Julius. The Normans in the South 1016-1130. Longmans: London, 1967.

Preceded by Michael Dokeianos	Catepan of Italy; 1041–1042	Succeeded by Synodianos
