= Banu Muhriz =

11th and 12th century Arab Dynasty

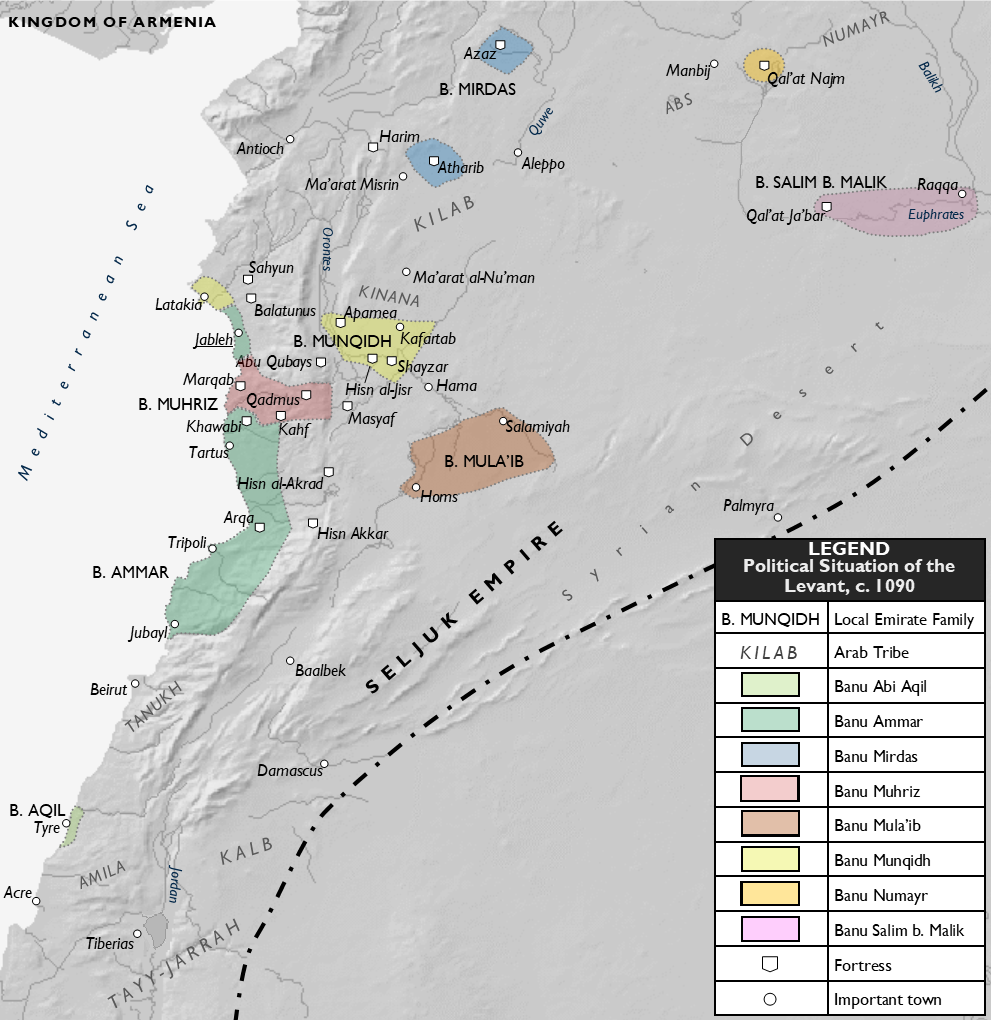
Political map of the Levant, c. 1090, with territory controlled by the Banu Muhriz shaded in red

The Banu Muhriz were an Arab princely family that controlled the fortresses of Marqab (Margat), Kahf and Qadmus in the late 11th and early 12th centuries.

The family is credited by a 13th-century Alawite treatise for patronizing the budding Alawite community in the southern Syrian Coastal Mountain Range, along with two other local families, the Banu'l-Ahmar and Banu'l-Arid. The former controlled the Balatunus (Mahalibeh) fortress until losing it to the Byzantines in 1031, while the latter were based in the mountains west of Homs. A member of the Banu Muhriz, the emir of Qadmus Abdallah ibn Ja'far ibn Muhriz, hosted the prominent Alawite missionary Abu'l-Khayr Ahmad ibn Salama al-Hadda (died 1065) in the fortress. An 11th-century poem by an Alawite religious figure celebrated the family. Alawite religious literature notes that another member of the family, the emir Nasih al-Dawla Jaysh ibn Muhammad ibn Muhriz, was a prominent Alawite scholar.

The Banu Muhriz lost control of Marqab to the Crusaders in 1117. From 1116, the area around Marqab had experienced scarcity and famine, compelling the Muhriz emir to offer control of the fortress to the Seljuk atabeg Toghtekin and the ruler of Jableh, Ibn al-Sulayha or Fakhr al-Mulk ibn Ammar, or threaten to hand it over to the Crusaders. Ibn al-Sulayha or Fakhr al-Mulk, with directions from Toghtekin, agreed to take possession of Marqab alongside the Banu Muhriz. In 1117–1118, a period marked by a poor harvest and food shortages in northern Syria, the Crusaders under Roger of Antioch moved toward Hama and Raphanea, both controlled by Toghtekin, and threatened to capture both towns unless Toghtekin ceded Marqab to them. Toghtekin acceded and instructed Ibn al-Sulayha to unconditionally hand over the fortress, but the Banu Muhriz ignored the orders, and Ibn al-Sulayha or Fakhr al-Mulk departed for Kahf. The Banu Muhriz refused to surrender Marqab to the Crusaders of Baniyas under Renaud I Masoiers, who had arrived to take possession of it, and entered negotiations to keep the family resident in Marqab under Crusader control. Although the Crusaders accepted and entered Marqab per the agreement, they soon after dislodged the Banu Muhriz and gave them the fortress of Maniqa instead. Not long after, Maniqa was captured from the family by the Crusaders.

The Banu Muhriz surrendered Qadmus to the Crusader lord Bohemond II of Antioch in 1129. It was captured by the Arab chieftain Sayf al-Mulk ibn Amrun with the assistance of the local Alawites in 1135. It was purchased from Ibn Amrun by the Isma'ilis in 1136. Kahf was lost to the Isma'ilis in 1137. Abdallah ibn Ja'far ibn Muhriz's tomb in Qadmus was venerated by local Alawite and Isma'ilis until it fell into disrepair in modern times.

== Bibliography ==
- Deschamps, Paul (1973). Les châteaux des Croisés en terre sainte III: la défense du comté de Tripoli et de la principauté d'Antioche (in French). Paris: Librairie Orientaliste Paul Geuthner.
- Friedman, Yaron (2010). The Nuṣayrī-ʻAlawīs: An Introduction to the Religion, History, and Identity of the Leading Minority in Syria. BRILL. ISBN 9004178929.
- Winter, Stefan (2016). A History of the 'Alawis: From Medieval Aleppo to the Turkish Republic. Princeton and Oxford: Princeton University Press. ISBN 9780691173894.
