= OPO =

"OPO" or "Opo" can refer to:

- OnePlus One, a smartphone model produced by the Chinese company OnePlus
- Optical parametric oscillator
- Francisco de Sá Carneiro Airport, known by IATA code OPO
- Organ procurement organization, which helps to arrange organ donation
- One-person operation in transport, where operation of a train, bus, or tram is by the driver alone, without a conductor
- Lagenaria siceraria, a squash commonly known as opo
- Opo the Dolphin, a famous dolphin in New Zealand
- Online Presence Ontology
- Orlando Philharmonic Orchestra
- Orlando Pops Orchestra
- Ovamboland People's Organization

== See also ==
- Opos (disambiguation)
- Oppo (disambiguation)
