= Beatrice of Saone =

Countess consort of Edessa, 1134 to 1150

Beatrice of Saone was countess consort of Edessa from 1134 to 1150 by marriage to Count Joscelin II of Edessa. She served as regent of the remnants of the County of Edessa in the absence of her spouse in 1150.

Her first husband, William of Zardana, died in 1132 or 1133, leaving her in the possession of the fortress of Saone in the Principality of Antioch. She soon married her late husband's close ally Count Joscelin II of Edessa. After her husband was captured by troops of Nur ad-Din, the atabeg (or governor) of Aleppo in May 1150, Beatrice became regent in the absence of her spouse. She entered into negotiations about the sale of the remnants of the County of Edessa to the Byzantine Empire. After the transfer was completed in August 1150, she and her children settled in Saone.

== Marriages ==
Born in a noble family, Beatrice first married William of Zardana, who was a powerful baron in the Principality of Antioch. After William perished in a battle in 1132 or 1133, Beatrice became a wealthy widow because she retained her dower possession—the castle of Saone—till the end of her life.

Count Joscelin II of Edessa married her most probably because he wanted to strengthen his position in northern Syria. Beatrice's first husband had been Joscelin's close ally.

Joscelin preferred to live in Turbessel, west of the river Euphrates, and charged mercenaries with the defence of Edessa. Imad ad-Din Zengi, the atabeg of Mosul and Aleppo, captured Edessa on 23 December 1144. He also conquered almost all Edessan fortresses to the east of the Euphrates.

== Regent ==
Joscelin was captured by troops of Zengi's son, Nur ad-Din, in early May 1150. He was taken to Aleppo where he was blinded. Beatrice sent new troops to the fortresses of the county to strengthen their defence, but both Nur ad-Din and the Seljuk sultan of Rum, Mesud I, invaded the county. Mesud persuaded the garrisons of Kesoun, Raban, Behesni and Marzban to surrender in return for a safe conduct to Turbessel, but he unsuccessfully besieged Turbessel before returned to Rum in June 1150. The Byzantine Emperor, Manuel I Komnenos, offered to pay an annual income to Beatrice and her children in return for the cession of the last fortresses of the county.

Baldwin III of Jerusalem who had led reinforcements from Jerusalem to northern Syria realized that the Franks were unable to defend the territory and authorized Beatrice to sell the county. The transfer was completed in Baldwin III's presence in August 1150. Beatrice ceded Turbessel, Aintab, Ravendel, Bira and Samosata to the Byzantines. She provisionally retained Qa'lat ar-Rum, but only to grant it to Grigor III Pahlavuni, the catholicos (or head) of the Armenian Church in Cilicia.

== In exile ==
Baldwin III put Beatrice and her family under her protection. Beatrice and her children, Joscelin III and Agnes, settled in Saone. Her husband died in captivity in Aleppo in May 1159.

== Sources ==
- Barber, Malcolm (2012). The Crusader States. Yale University Press. ISBN 978-0-300-11312-9.
- Buck, Andrew D. (2017). The Principality of Antioch and its Frontiers in the Twelfth Century. The Boydell Press. ISBN 978-1-78327-173-3.
- Hamilton, Bernard (2000). The Leper King and His Heirs: Baldwin IV and the Crusader Kingdom of Jerusalem. Cambridge University Press. ISBN 978-0-521-64187-6.
- Nicholson, Robert Lawrence (1973). Joscelyn III and the Fall of the Crusader States, 1134-1199. BRILL. ISBN 90-04-03676-8.
