= Nasr ibn Musharraf al-Rawadifi =

Arab chieftain of Maniqa

Nasr ibn Musharraf al-Rawadifi (Arabic: نصر بن مشرف الروادفي; died 1032) was an Arab chieftain of the Citadel of Maniqa and Jabal al-Rawadif near Antioch.

== Biography ==
In 1027 AD, the ruler of Aleppo, Salih ibn Mirdas, was able to defeat doux of Antioch, Michael Spondyles who was inexperienced in warfare. Nevertheless, Pothos Argyros succeeded in capturing Nasr ibn Musharraf al-Rawadifi, ruler of the disputed border area of Jabal Rawadif, who later succeeded in being set free after promising assistance to Michael Spondyles. Al-Rawadifi also managed to convince the doux of the necessity of building the Citadel of Maniqa to increase the control of the Byzantines in the region. The doux of Antioch was persuaded by al-Rawadifi's suggestion, and decided to build the castle from Byzantine financing, according to the historian John Skylitzes, and put 1,000 Roman soldiers to protect it. Emperor Romanos III Argyros also decided to promote al-Rawadifi to be the dignity of patrikios.

As the construction of the fortress was completed, al-Rawadifi sent news to the judge of Tripoli and the Fatimid commander of the region to attack the Byzantine garrison. After killing the guards and capturing it, al-Rawadifi succeeded in controlling Bikisrail as well. He then attempted to occupy Maraclea, but the doux of Antioch, Niketas of Mistheia, was able to repel the siege.

In 1031 AD, Niketas attempted to take control of Maniqa, but the army of al-Rawadifi managed to burn the siege equipment at night, forcing the Byzantines to withdraw. One year later, Niketas succeeded in capturing the castle after a 13-day siege, in addition to al-Rawadifi's wife and four daughters, meanwhile al-Rawadifi managed to escape.

In 1032 AD, al-Rawadifi was killed fighting the Byzantines near Tripoli.

== Sources ==
- Felix, Wolfgang (1981). Byzanz und die islamische Welt im früheren 11. Jahrhundert (in German). Vienna: Verlag der Österreichischen Akademie der Wissenschaften. ISBN 9783700103790.
- Wortley, John, ed. (2010). John Skylitzes: A Synopsis of Byzantine History, 811–1057. Cambridge: Cambridge University Press. ISBN 978-0-521-76705-7.
