= Christophoros Burgaris =

Byzantine catepan of Italy

Christopher or Christophoros Burgaris (Greek: Χριστόφορος Βούλγαρης) was an imperial protospatharios and the short-tenured successor of the famous Basil Boioannes as catepan of Italy.

The chronicler Lupus Protospatharius gives the date of Boioannes' departure as 1029, but modern historian Ferdinand Chalandon corrects this to 1027. This synchronises with the death of Guaimar III of Salerno, though other events associated with it are known to have occurred in 1028. Lupus, however, misplaces the election of Byzantius as archbishop of Bari, which occurred before 1025, in this year and therefore his whole chronology for the period seems to be in error, in our manuscripts at least.

Christophoros saw the recommencement of the Saracen incursions. In 1027, Obbiano capitulated and Bari had to repel and assault. Christophoros was out of power by 1029. He was replaced by Pothos, under whom the Saracen attacks continued.

== Family ==
A church inscription in Thessaloniki from Christophoros' time as catepan records that he had three children with his wife Maria:

- Nikephoros
- Anna
- Katakale

== Sources ==
- Chalandon, Ferdinand. Histoire de la domination normande en Italie et en Sicile. Paris, 1907.

Preceded by Basil Boioannes	Catepan of Italy; 1027–1029	Succeeded by Pothos Argyros
