= Michael Protospatharios =

Michael Protospatharios (Italian: Michele Protospatario) was the Byzantine catepan of Italy from 1031 to 1033. He was sent to Bari after his predecessor, Pothos Argyrus, was killed in battle with the Saracens who had taken Cassano allo Ionio in Calabria.

Protospatharios was a high official in the imperial court of Constantinople. He held several high-ranking titles. When he was at the zenith of his career, his full title was: ἐπὶ τῶν οἰκιακῶν, κατεπάνω Ἰταλίας, κριτὴς τοῦ βήλου καί τοῦ ἱπποδρόμου, that is, "Chamberlain, catepan of Italy, and kritēs of the vēlon and the Hippodrome". The kritēs was probably an officer in charge of processing requests for an audience with the emperor.

Protospatharios arrived in Italy early in 1032 with a new army comprising auxiliaries (recruits from the West) and elite troops from Asia Minor and Syria. It is unknown what became of this force.

Protospatharios was replaced in 1033 by Constantinos Opos.

== Sources ==
- Gay, Jules. L'Italie méridionale et l'empire Byzantin: Livre II. Burt Franklin: New York, 1904.

| Preceded by Pothos Argyros | Catepan of Italy; 1031–1033 | Succeeded by Constantine Opos |
