= 1280 =

1280 in various calendars
- Gregorian calendar: 1280; MCCLXXX
- Ab urbe condita: 2033
- Armenian calendar: 729; ԹՎ ՉԻԹ
- Assyrian calendar: 6030
- Balinese saka calendar: 1201–1202
- Bengali calendar: 686–687
- Berber calendar: 2230
- English Regnal year: 8 Edw. 1 – 9 Edw. 1
- Buddhist calendar: 1824
- Burmese calendar: 642
- Byzantine calendar: 6788–6789
- Chinese calendar: 己卯年 (Earth Rabbit); 3977 or 3770 — to — 庚辰年 (Metal Dragon); 3978 or 3771
- Coptic calendar: 996–997
- Discordian calendar: 2446
- Ethiopian calendar: 1272–1273
- Hebrew calendar: 5040–5041
- Hindu calendars
- Vikram Samvat: 1336–1337
- Shaka Samvat: 1201–1202
- Kali Yuga: 4380–4381
- Holocene calendar: 11280
- Igbo calendar: 280–281
- Iranian calendar: 658–659
- Islamic calendar: 678–679
- Japanese calendar: Kōan 3 (弘安３年)
- Javanese calendar: 1190–1191
- Julian calendar: 1280; MCCLXXX
- Korean calendar: 3613
- Minguo calendar: 632 before ROC 民前632年
- Nanakshahi calendar: −188
- Thai solar calendar: 1822–1823
- Tibetan calendar: ས་མོ་ཡོས་ལོ་ (female Earth-Hare); 1406 or 1025 or 253 — to — ལྕགས་ཕོ་འབྲུག་ལོ་ (male Iron-Dragon); 1407 or 1026 or 254

1280 (MCCLXXX) was a leap year starting on Monday in the Julian calendar. It was the 1280th year of the Common Era (CE) and Anno Domini (AD) designations, the 280th year of the 2nd millennium, the 80th year of the 13th century, and the first year of the 1280s decade.

== Events ==
- June 18 – Battle of al-Jassora: Syria attempts to secede from the Mamluk Sultanate of Egypt, but Al Mansur Qalawun defeats the rebels and keeps Syria within the Egyptian sultanate.
- June 23 – Reconquista: Battle of Moclín – Troops of the Emirate of Granada defeat those of the Kingdom of Castile and Kingdom of León.
- September 27 – King Magnus Ladulås of Sweden founds a Swedish nobility by enacting a law accepting a contribution of a cavalry member in lieu of ordinary tax payments.
- Tsar Ivan Asen III of Bulgaria flees from Tarnovo, ending the Asen dynasty in Bulgaria.
- Turin is conquered by Thomas III of Savoy, becoming the capital of the House of Savoy.
- Construction on the northern section of the Grand Canal of China has begun.
- The final expansion of Lincoln Cathedral in England is completed.
- The second of two main surveys of the Hundred Rolls, an English census seen as a follow-up to the Domesday Book (completed in 1086), is finished; it began in 1279.
- Approximate date
  - The ancestors of the Māori people from eastern Polynesia become the first human settlers of New Zealand.
  - The Wolf minimum of solar activity begins.

== Births ==
- Birger, King of Sweden, Swedish monarch (d. 1321)
- Wu Zhen, Chinese painter (d. 1354)
- Approximate date
  - Anna of Kashin, Russian princess consort and saint (d. 1368)
  - Mansa Musa, mansa of the Mali Empire (d. c.1337)

== Deaths ==
- February 10 – Countess Margaret II of Flanders (b. 1202)
- May 9 – Magnus VI of Norway
- August 22 – Pope Nicholas III (b. 1218)
- November 15 – Albertus Magnus, German theologian
- Approximate date – Ertuğrul, Ottoman bey, father of Osman I
