= Pothos =

Pothos may refer to:

- Pothos (mythology), a god in Greek mythology and religion
- Pothos (plant), a genus of plants
  - Epipremnum aureum, a plant often grown indoors (formerly grouped within the genus Pothos and commonly known as "pothos")
- A statue by Scopas

== See also ==
- Pothos Argyros
- Pathos (disambiguation)
