= Robert the Leper =

Robert fitz-Fulk

Lord of Zardana
- Reign: c. 1112–1119

Lord of Saone
- Reign: c. 1117–1119
- Successor: William of Zardana
- Died: August 1119; Damascus
- Issue: William of Zardana; Garenton of Saone
- Father: Fulk
- Religion: Roman Catholicism

Robert fitz-Fulk the Leper, also known as Robert Fulcoy, Robert the Leprous, or Robert of Saone (died in August 1119), was a powerful baron in the Principality of Antioch.

== Early career ==
Walter the Chancellor's contemporaneous chronicle is one of the principal sources of Robert's life. A later author, Usama ibn Munqidh, also mentioned Robert in his Kitab al-I'tibar, because he regarded Robert's life as a good example of bizarre occurrences in human lives. Robert's origin and early life are unknown. He was first mentioned in two charters of the ruler of Antioch, Roger of Salerno in 1108. Both documents referred to Robert as an Antiochene aristocrat.

Robert received Zardana from Roger, probably after the crusaders occupied the fortress in 1111. Located to the east of the Orontes River, Zardana was one of the most important border forts in the principality. Robert must have possessed Zardana when he granted a nearby village, Merdic (identified as Mardikh in Syria), to the Abbey of Our Lady of Josaphat in 1114. His grant was confirmed by Roger. Usama recorded that Robert was befriended by atabeg (or regent) of Damascus, Toghtekin, and they agreed not to attack each other's lands.

== Powerful baron ==
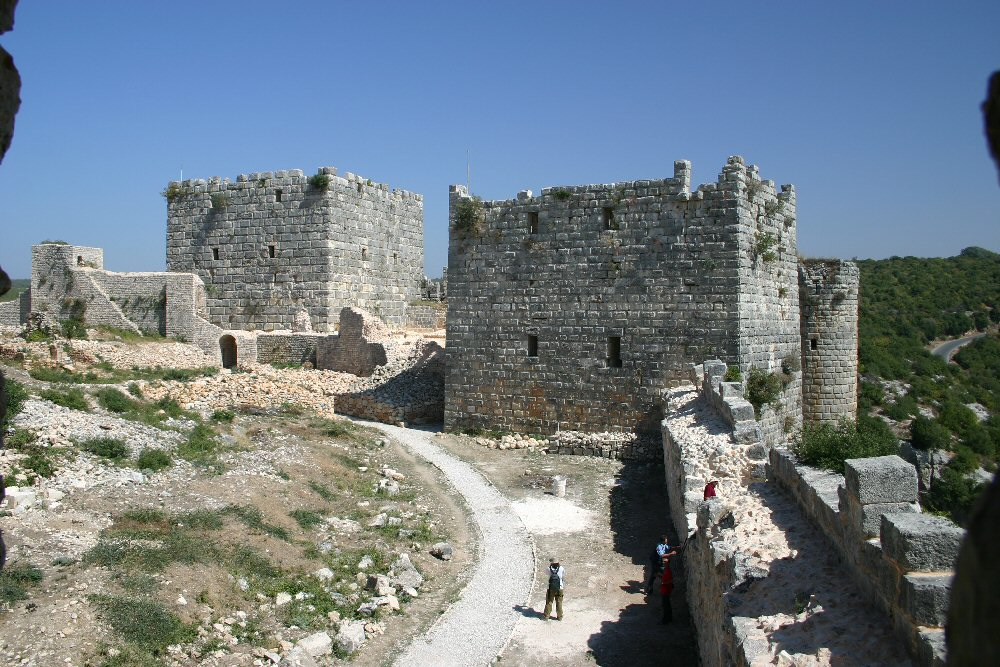
Ruins of the fortress of Saone

The Seljuk general Bursuq ibn Bursuq captured the important border fortress of Kafartab on around 3 September 1115. Bursuq started to build siege engines, most probably in preparation for an attack against Zardana. His emerging power menaced the independence of the Muslim rulers of Syria. Toghtekin and the Artuqid emir, Ilghazi, made an alliance with Roger and promised to lead reinforcements to him. Robert accompanied Ilghazi to Apamea where the crusader troops and their Muslim allies were assembling. Roger and his Muslim allies routed Bursuq in the Battle of Sarmin on 14 September.

The Antiochene troops captured a series of fortresses near the coast between 1115 and 1119. Saone was captured before 1118, Balatanos in 1118. Roger granted both castles most probably soon to Robert, because Usama referred to Robert as "the lord of Saone, Balatanos and the adjoining region".

Ilghazi almost annihilated the Antiochene army in the Battle of the "Field of Blood" on 28 June 1119. Since Roger died fighting in the battlefield, Baldwin II of Jerusalem and Pons of Tripoli hurried to Antioch in July to defend the principality. The Antiochene barons elected Baldwin II as regent and he promised to protect their estates. Baldwin II ordered the local troops to assemble at Antioch. Robert obeyed the summons and left Zardana for Antioch. Ilghazi laid siege Zardana and captured it on 12 August. Learning of the siege of his fortress, William tried to convince Baldwin II to relieve his fortress. On 14 August, Baldwin II led the Frankish army to retrieve the lands lost to Muslims, as Robert protected the left flank. The two armies met at the Battle of Hab, in which Robert overcame the force opposed to him, then he hurried to Zardana, but he fell off his horse and was captured by Ilghazi's troops.

Robert was taken to Damascus where he offered 10,000 dinars as ransom to Toghtekin. However, he refused to convert to Islam for which Toghtekin beheaded him. His skull was decorated with jewels and Toghtekin used it as a drinking cup. Robert's sons, William of Zardana and Garenton of Saone inherited his estates. Robert's descendants possessed Saone until it was captured by Saladin in 1188.

== Sources ==
- Asbridge, Thomas (2000). The Creation of the Principality of Antioch, 1098–1130. The Boydell Press. ISBN 978-0-85115-661-3.
- Barber, Malcolm (2012). The Crusader States. Yale University Press. ISBN 978-0-300-11312-9.
- Kennedy, Hugh (1994). Crusader Castles. Cambridge University Press. ISBN 0-521-79913-9.
- Oman, Charles (2018). Routledge Revivals: A History of the Art of War in the Middle Ages (1978): Volume One 378-1278. Routledge. ISBN 9781351335522.
