= William of Zardana =

Lord of Saone
- Reign: 1119–1132/33
- Predecessor: Robert the Leper
- Successor: Beatrice

Lord of Zardana
- Reign: 1121–1132/33
- Died: 1132/33
- Spouse: Beatrice
- Father: Robert the Leper
- Religion: Roman Catholicism

William of Zardana, also known as William of Saone (died in 1132 or 1133), was a powerful baron who held Balatanos, Saone and Zardana in the Principality of Antioch. After his father, Robert the Leper, was executed by the atabeg (or governor) of Toghtekin in 1119, William inherited Balatanos and Saone. Zardana, that his father had lost before his death, was restored to William by Baldwin II of Jerusalem in 1121. He supported Baldwin II's daughter, Alice, against her brother-in-law, Fulk of Jerusalem, in 1132, but Fulk defeated her allies. William died fighting either against Fulk's troops or against a Muslim army.

== Family ==
William was the son of Robert the Leper, who held important fiefs in the Principality of Antioch. Two of Robert's three castles—Saone and Balatanos—were located near Latakia, the third, Zardana, to the east of the Orontes River. Zardana was taken by Toghtekin, atabeg of Damascus, in 1119. Robert was captured during the siege and Toghtekin had him executed. William and his brother, Garenton, inherited their father's domains. Saone was strengthened during either his or his father's tenure.

== Antiochene baron ==
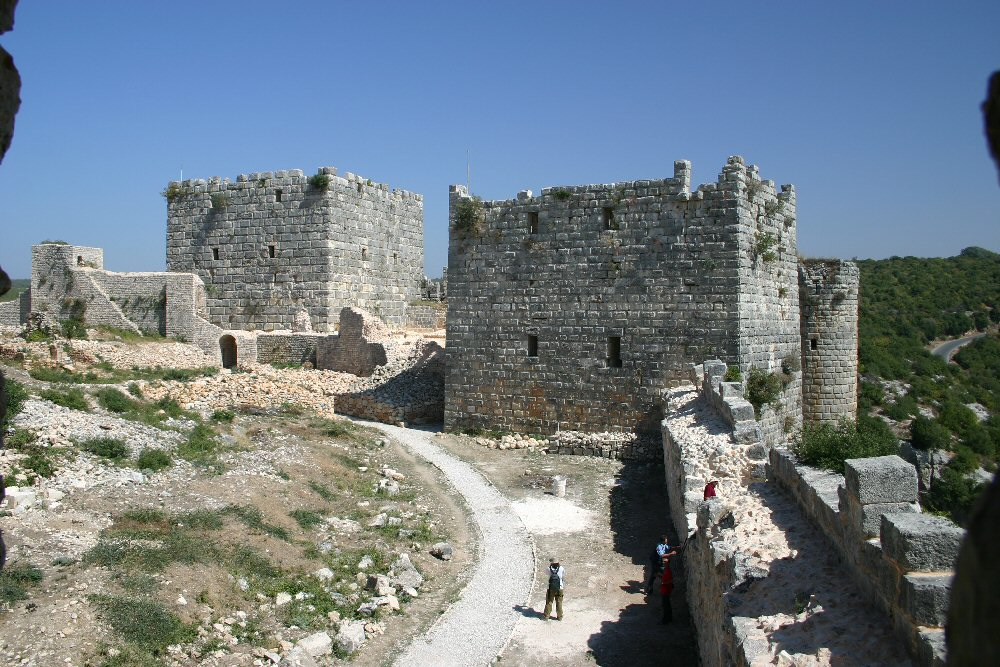
Ruins of the fortress of Saone

King Baldwin II of Jerusalem ruled Antioch on behalf of the minor prince, Bohemond II, from 1119. Historian Thomas Asbridge says, William may have been one of the barons who persuaded the king to pursue an aggressive policy against the Muslims of Aleppo. Indeed, the 13th-century historian, Ibn al-Adim, mentioned that Baldwin II laid siege to Zardana "for William" in 1121. Zardana surrendered to Baldwin who restored the fortress to William. A year later, the Artuqid rulers, Ilghazi and Balak, jointly attacked Zardana. William defended the fortress for fifteen days before he surrendered it, but he soon routed Ilghazi at Harbal. Due to his proximity to Aleppo, Zardana was one of the strategically most important fortresses in the principality.

Bohemond II assumed the government of Antioch in 1126, but died four years later. His widow, Alice, wanted to secure the rule of Antioch for herself against her brother-in-law, Fulk of Jerusalem, in 1132. William and his brother supported her, but Fulk defeated her allies and appointed Rainald I Masoir to administer the principality. William died during either this conflict or a Muslim attack against Zardana. His widow, Beatrice, married Joscelin II of Courtenay.

== Sources ==
- Asbridge, Thomas (2000). The Creation of the Principality of Antioch, 1098–1130. The Boydell Press. ISBN 978-0-85115-661-3.
- Barber, Malcolm (2012). The Crusader States. Yale University Press. ISBN 978-0-300-11312-9.
- Buck, Andrew D. (2017). The Principality of Antioch and its Frontiers in the Twelfth Century. The Boydell Press. ISBN 978-1-78327-173-3.
- Kennedy, Hugh (1994). Crusader Castles. Cambridge University Press. ISBN 0-521-79913-9.
