= John Raphael =

John Raphael may refer to:

- John Raphael (catepan), the Catepan of Italy from 1046 to 1049
- John Raphael (sportsman) (1882–1917), Belgian-born English cricketer and rugby union footballer
- John Raphael Smith (1752–1812), English painter and mezzotint engraver
