= Opos =

Opos may refer to:

- Constantine Opos (disambiguation), various people
- Opos the Brave, Hungarian knight
- OPOS, point of sale device standard for Microsoft Windows

== See also ==
- Opo (disambiguation)
- Opus (disambiguation)
