= Maniqa =

Castle in Syria

- قلعة المنيقة
- Near Baniyas, Syria

Site information
- Condition: Ruin

Location
- Location within Syria
- Coordinates: 35.251988°N 36.094855°E

Site history
- Built: 1028
- Built by: Nasr ibn Musharraf al-Rawadifi

Maniqa (Arabic: المنيقة) is a castle located in the Syrian Coastal Mountain Range, dated back to the Roman era, it was also known as "Malikas" or "Malghanes" during the Crusader rule.

== History ==
In 1028, Byzantine doux of Antioch Michael Spondyles was tricked by the Arab tribal leader Nasr ibn Musharraf al-Rawadifi to construct a fortress at Maniqa from where he would defend the Byzantine domains. Michael agreed and even sent a 1,000-strong garrison there, but when the fortress was finished, Nasr refused to hand it over, and with assistance from the qadi of Tripoli and the local Fatimid commander, he killed the garrison. In 1030, Byzantine Emperor Romanos III Argyros ordered Niketas of Mistheia, doux of Antioch, to recapture Maniqa from al-Rawadifi. Niketas managed to control the fort in 1031 after a 13-day siege, in which he also captured Nasr's wife and four daughters, who were abandoned to their fate. Niketas then secured the region by 1032.

In 1118 or 1119, Rainald I Masoir persuaded the commander of Margat from Banu Muhriz to surrender the fortress to him, along with the nearby forts Maniqa, Qulay'a and Hadid.

During the mid-12th century the Assassins captured or acquired several fortresses in the Syrian Coastal Mountain Range including Maniqa. For the most part, the Assassins maintained full control over these fortresses until 1270–73 when the Mamluk sultan Baibars annexed them.

== Sources ==
- Asbridge, Thomas (2000). The Creation of the Principality of Antioch, 1098–1130. The Boydell Press. ISBN 978-0-85115-661-3.
- Bury, John Bagnell; Gwatkin, Henry Melvill (1964). The Cambridge Medieval History: The rise of the Saracens and the foundation of the Western empire. University Press.
- Raphael, Kate (2011). Muslim Fortresses in the Levant: Between Crusaders and Mongols. Taylor & Francis US. ISBN 978-0-415-56925-5.
- Theotokis, Georgios; Meško, Marek (2020). War in Eleventh-Century Byzantium. Routledge. ISBN 9780429576881.
