= Sibari =

- Frazione
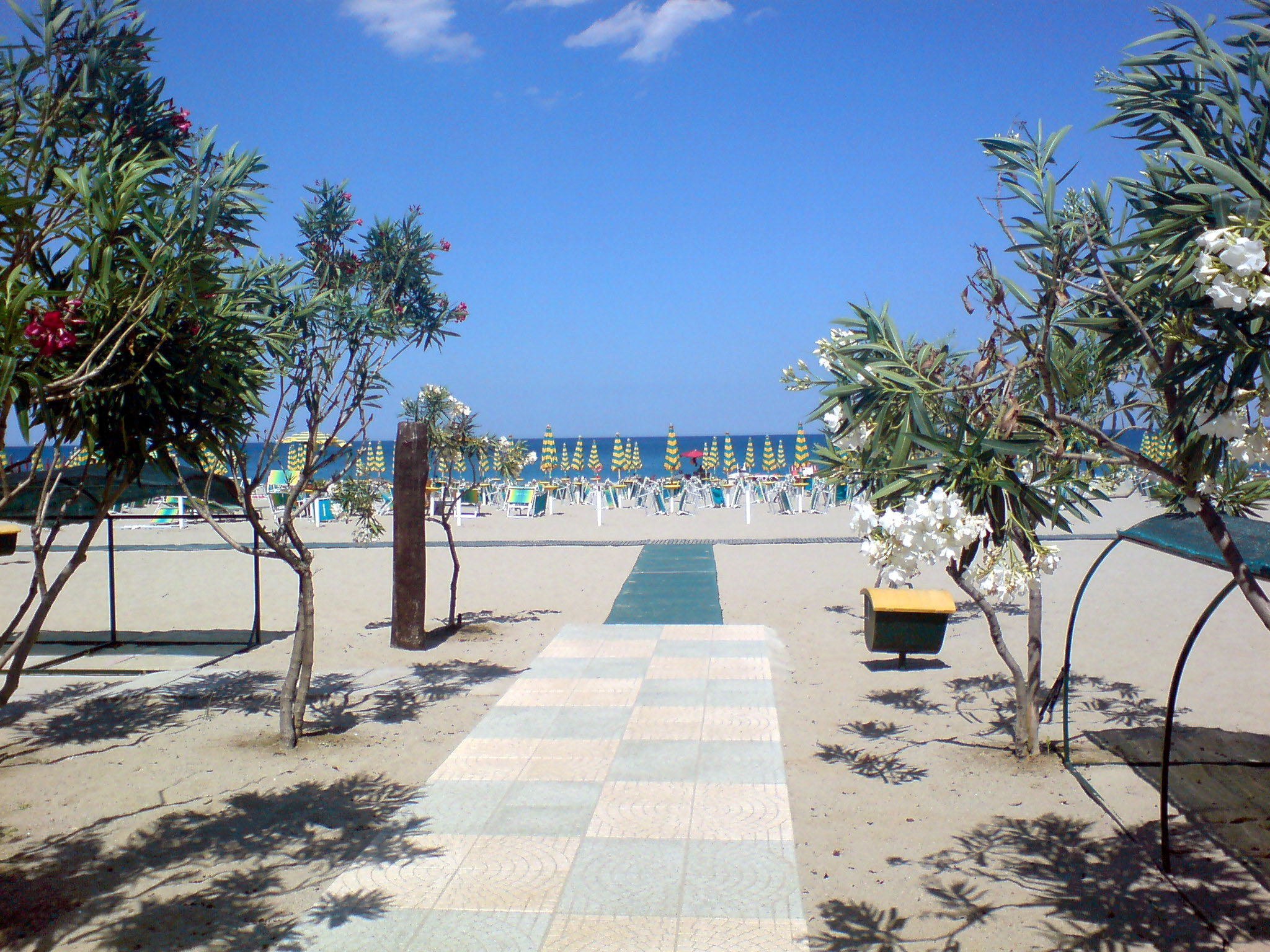
- Sibari beach

- Location of Sibari in Italy
- Coordinates: 39°45′3″N 16°27′5″E
- Country: Italy
- Region: Calabria
- Province: Cosenza (CS)
- Comune: Cassano allo Ionio
- Elevation: 4 m (13 ft)

Population
  - Total: 5,000
- Demonym: Sibariti
- Time zone: UTC+1 (CET)
  - Summer (DST): UTC+2 (CEST)
- Postal code: 87011
- Dialing code: 0981
- Patron saint: Saint Joseph and Our Lady of Graces
- Saint day: 19 March

Sibari is an Italian frazione of the comune (municipality) of Cassano allo Ionio. It lies in the province of Cosenza which is part of the region Calabria.

== Geography ==
It is located close to the Gulf of Taranto and the archaeological sites of the Ancient Greek cities of Sybaris and Thurii which can be found a few kilometers to the southeast of the town. It also has a train station.

== History ==
It was founded in the 1960s. The town has grown after a program of land reclamation. In the 1980s and 1990s beach tourism developed in the town. The local agriculture produces citrus fruits, olives and rice. In recent years there have been numerous attempts to gain autonomy, which have failed.
