= Pothos Argyros =

Pothos Argyros or Argyrus (Greek: Πόθος Αργυρός) can refer to:

- Pothos Argyros (Domestic of the Schools) (fl. 900s–922), Byzantine general and Domestic of the Schools
- Pothos Argyros (11th century) (fl. 1030s), Byzantine general and catepan of Italy
