= Basil Theodorokanos =

Byzantine admiral

Basil III Theodorokanos or Theodorocanus (Greek: Βασίλειος Θεοδωροκάνος, Italian: Teodoro Cano) was the Byzantine Catepan of Italy from February to the Spring of 1043. He was a patrician and a former companion in arms of George Maniakes when he was appointed to go to Apulia and Calabria and put down the revolts of Maniakes and of Argyrus in 1042. In February 1043, he landed at Bari. Argyrus and his Normans tried to surround Otranto, but the catepan's fleet blocked them. Maniakes, however, debarked for Dyrrhachium with his army. Argyrus eventually made peace with the Greeks and Theodorokanos was replaced by Eustathios Palatinos. Subsequently, he commanded the Byzantine fleet against the Rus' raid in July 1043.

== Sources ==
- Gay, Jules. L'Italie méridionale et l'empire Byzantin: Livre II. Burt Franklin: New York, 1904.
- Chalandon, Ferdinand. Histoire de la domination normande en Italie et en Sicile. Paris, 1907.

Preceded by Pardos	Catepan of Italy; 1043	Succeeded by Eustathios Palatinos
