= Constantine Opos =

Constantine Opos (Ancient Greek: Κωνσταντίνος Ὤπος) can refer to:

- Constantine Opos (catepan), Byzantine Catepan of Italy in 1033–1038
- Constantine Opos (megas doux), Byzantine general in the reign of Alexios I Komnenos (1081–1118)
