= Siege of Sahyun Castle =

Crusader battle in Syria, 12th century

- Part of The Crusades
Date	26–29 July 1188
Location	Sahyun Castle
Result	Ayyubid victory

Belligerents
Ayyubid Sultanate	Knights Hospitaller

Commanders and leaders
Saladin; Az-Zahir Ghazi	Armengol de Aspa

Strength
6 mangonels	Unknown

Casualties and losses
Unknown	Unknown

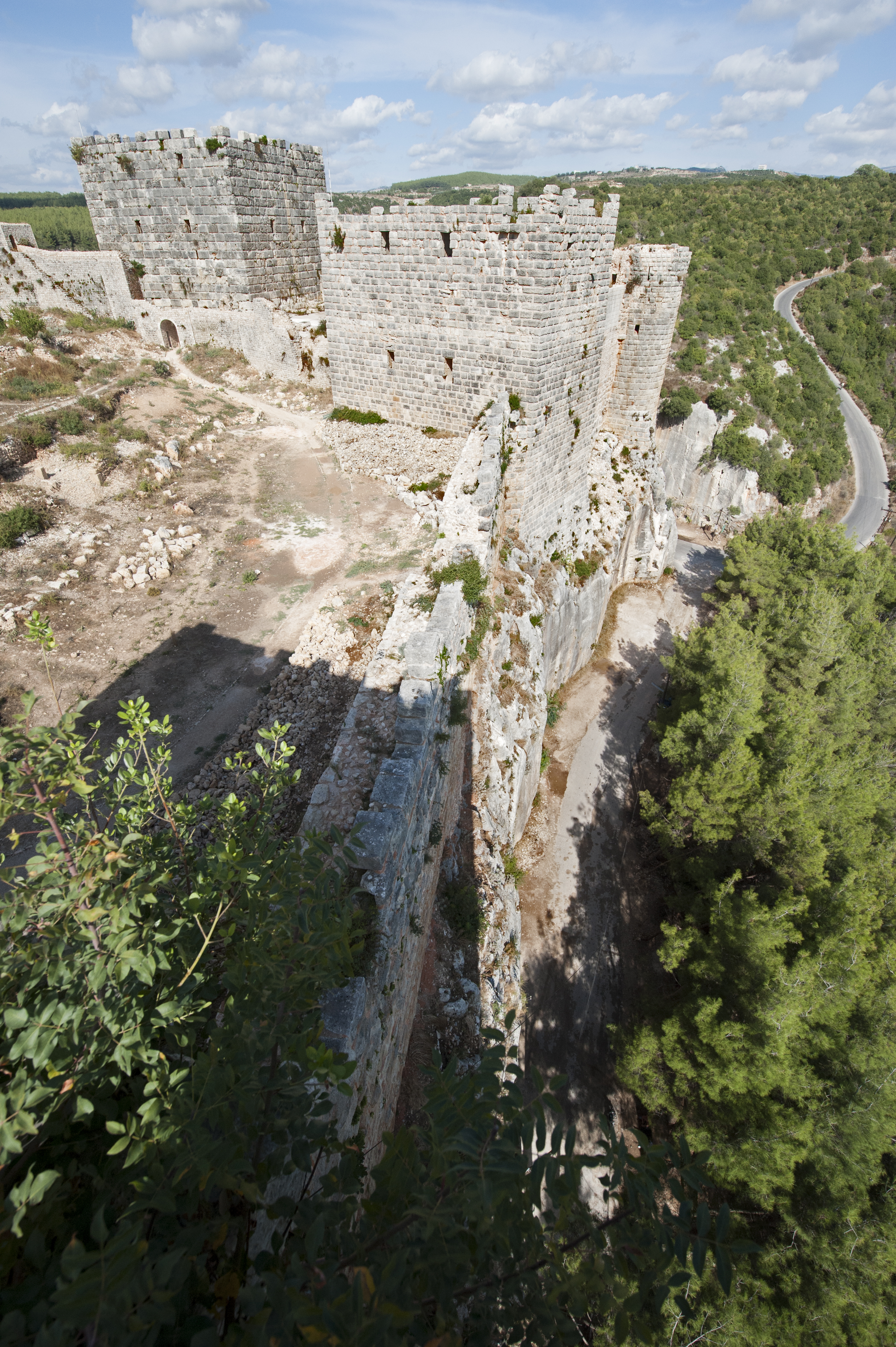
An aerial view of the Sahyun castle and the ditches surrounding it

The siege of Sahyun Castle took place in July 1188 between the Ayyubid Sultanate led by Saladin and the Knights Hospitaller, who held Sahyun Castle. After a few days of siege, the castle was captured.

== Siege ==
Saladin departed from Latakia after its capture, he marched towards Sahyun Castle on the 29th Jumada I (26 July 1188), the castle was held by Knights Hospitallers, Saladin surrounded the place with his army and set up six mangonels to bombard the walls. The castle is an inaccessible fortress built on a steep slope of a mountain protected by wide ravines of fearful depth, but on one side it was only defended by a 60-inch trench.

The fort had three ramparts, and on the summit of the castle, there was a long flag on a turret that fell when the Ayyubid troops were getting near, which was considered a good omen. The castle was attacked from all sides, and Az-Zahir Ghazi lord of Aleppo, brought his mangonel into the siege. He had set it up opposite the stronghold, close to the walls, but on the other side of the ravine, the prince continued to bombard the walls with stones, and the mangonel successfully hit its targets.

A breach was finally made; it was large enough for the soldiers to climb up the rampart. On Friday morning of the second day Jumada II (29 July), Saladin gave command to assault, ordering the men to keep bombarding the walls without stopping. The Ayyubdis attacked with shouts, and an hour later the Ayyubids scaled the walls and went towards the courtyard. The crusaders in the courtyard fled to the courtyard, leaving everything behind them to be pillaged by the Ayyubids.

The Ayyubids then surrounded the keep, and the Hospitallers, thinking they would be annihilated, asked for a quarter. Saladin promised them safety and allowed them to depart with their properties, but he demanded a ransom of ten pieces of gold from each man, five pieces from each woman, and two pieces from children. Saladin then took possession of the fort.
