= Eustathios Palatinos =

Eustathios Palatinos (Latin: Eustachius Palatinus, Italian: Eustachio Palatino) was the catepan of Italy from the autumn of 1045 to September 1046. The primary source for his term of office is the chronicle of Lupus, a fellow protospatharius.

He was sent to replace Argyrus after the latter was recalled to Constantinople. He arrived in Otranto and travelled to Bari, his seat. He was defeated near Taranto by Drogo of Hauteville, the brother of the Norman count of Apulia. He returned to Bari whence he was met by the new catepan, John Raphael.

== Sources ==
- Chalandon, Ferdinand. Histoire de la domination normande en Italie et en Sicilie. Paris, 1907.

Preceded by Basil Theodorokanos	Catepan of Italy; Autumn 1045 - 1046	Succeeded by John Raphael
