= Rainald I Masoir =

Governor of Antioch
- In office 1132–1135

Rainald I Masoir, also known as Renaud I Masoir (died around 1135), was constable of the Principality of Antioch from around 1126, and also baillif (or governor) of the principality from 1132. Although he was a prominent military commander and held important offices, most details of his life are unknown. He received his first estates in the southern regions of Antioch in the 1110s. He made the strong fortress of Margat the center of his domains. He regularly witnessed the Antiochene rulers' diplomas from the 1120s. He was most probably still the actual ruler of the principality when he died.

== Early career ==
Rainald's origins and family are unknown, but he was most probably born in France. He may have received the fortress of Baniyas (near Jabala) shortly after it was captured by Antiochene troops in May 1109, according to historian Thomas Asbridge. Rainald persuaded the commander of Margat to surrender the fortress to him, along with the nearby forts Maniqa, Qulay'ah and Hadid in 1118 or 1119. Their possession secured the Franks' control of the mainland routes between Antioch and the County of Tripoli. Marqat developed into the center of Rainald's domains.

The Artuqid emir, Ilghazi, and the atabeg (or governor) of Damascus, Toghtekin, invaded Antioch in the spring of 1119. Roger of Salerno, who had ruled the principality since 1112, sent envoys to Baldwin II of Jerusalem, seeking his assistance. Urged by the Antiochene marcher lords, Roger decided not to wait until the arrival of the Jerusalemite troops and led his troops to meet the enemy near the borders. He ordered Rainald to lead "three divisions of troops" to Sarmada, most probably because he wanted to encircle the invaders' camp. Ilghazi and his allies almost annihilated the Antiochene army in the Battle of the "Field of Blood" on 28 June. Rainald was seriously wounded in the battlefield and withdrew to Sarmada together with his few retainers who survived the massacre. Ilghazi approached Sarmada and promised to release Rainald a month later if Rainald did not resist. After Ilghazi gave his ring to Rainald as a guarantee, Rainald surrendered the fortress without resistance.

== Great officer ==
Baldwin II reached Antioch weeks after the battle. He was elected baillif (or regent) for the absent and minor prince, Bohemond II. Baldwin II's charter of grant to the Abbey of Our Lady of Josaphat which was issued in 1122 is the first extant document which was witnessed by Rainald. He was listed as the last among the witnesses. Bohemond II assumed the government of the principality in October 1126. He confirmed the privileges of the Genoese in 1127. Bohemond's diploma refers to Rainald as constable, showing that Rainald had already been appointed to that office. Rainald signed the document as the first among the lay witnesses. He is the only lay landholder who was elevated to a great office in the principality in the 12th century.

The Assassins stirred up a riot at Bikisrail in 1131. He hurried to the region to mediate a settlement, but the Assassins could not be pacified for long. They seized Qadmus in the mountains two years later.

Bohemond II's widow, Alice of Jerusalem, claimed the regency for her minor daughter, Constance of Antioch, against her brother-in-law, King Fulk of Jerusalem in 1132. Counts Pons of Tripoli and Joscelin II of Edessa and the powerful Antiochene barons William of Zardana and Garenton of Saone supported Alice, but Fulk came to Antioch and defeated her supporters near Chastel Rouge. Before leaving the principality, Fulk made Rainald his baillif.

Rainald's activities cannot be documented after around 1135. His son, Rainald II Masoir, married Pons of Tripoli's daughter, Agnes. His descendants were the most influential barons of the principality for decades. Their domains included most of the southern region of the principality.

== Sources ==
- Asbridge, Thomas (2000). The Creation of the Principality of Antioch, 1098–1130. The Boydell Press. ISBN 978-0-85115-661-3.
- Barber, Malcolm (2012). The Crusader States. Yale University Press. ISBN 978-0-300-11312-9.
- Buck, Andrew D. (2017). The Principality of Antioch and its Frontiers in the Twelfth Century. The Boydell Press. ISBN 978-1-78327-173-3.
- Kennedy, Hugh (1994). Crusader Castles. Cambridge University Press. ISBN 0-521-79913-9.
- Lock, Peter (2006). The Routledge Companion to the Crusades. Routledge. ISBN 9-78-0-415-39312-6.
