= Niketas of Mistheia =

Doux of Antioch

Niketas of Mistheia was a Byzantine official, originally from Mistheia, and doux of Antioch (1030–1032). He was an eunuch who held the titles of patrikios and rhaiktor.

== Career ==
In 1030, Byzantine Emperor Romanos III Argyros appointed Niketas as katepano of Antioch, following the Battle of Azaz against the Mirdasid dynasty. Later on, he managed to force a coalition of Arab tribes led by Nasr ibn Musharraf al-Rawadifi to withdraw from besieging Maraclea. He then sacked 'Irqa and destroyed the village of Kurin. In December of the same year, the Byzantine generals Niketas of Mistheia and Symeon the protovestiarios besieged and captured Azaz, and burned Tubbal.

In 1031, he took Balatunus from Banu al-Ahmar, some forts from Banu Ghannaj and Ibn al-Kashih, but failed to seize the fortress of Maniqa, as al-Rawadifi managed to burn their siege equipment. However, he re-sacked 'Irqa, taking many prisoners and cattle.

He later organized another campaign to recapture Maniqa from al-Rawadifi. Prior to that, he captured Rafaniyya and destroyed its towers, then managed to free a captured Byzantine Taxiarches in Safita. Afterwards, he controlled Maniqa after a 13-day, in which he also captured Nasr's wife and four daughters, who were abandoned to their fate. On his way back to Antioch, he burned Jaririn.

In 1032, he secured the region by suppressing a Druze revolt in Mount Summaq, and capturing Bikisrail, despite attempts from the Fatimid commander Anushtakin al-Dizbari to divert the attackers. Eventually, he returned to Constantinople.

== Sources ==
- Bury, John Bagnell; Gwatkin, Henry Melvill (1964). The Cambridge Medieval History: The rise of the Saracens and the foundation of the Western empire. University Press.
- Halm, Heinz (2003). Die Kalifen von Kairo: Die Fatimiden in Ägypten, 973–1074 [The Caliphs of Cairo: The Fatimids in Egypt, 973–1074] (in German). Munich: C. H. Beck. ISBN 3-406-48654-1.
- Theotokis, Georgios; Meško, Marek (2020). War in Eleventh-Century Byzantium. Routledge. ISBN 9780429576881.
- Tougher, Shaun (2009). The Eunuch in Byzantine History and Society. Taylor & Francis. ISBN 9781135235710.

Preceded by Constantine Karantenos	Doux of Antioch; 1030–1032	Succeeded by Niketas
