= Michael Spondyles =

Michael Spondyles (Greek: Μιχαὴλ Σπονδύλης, Italian: Michele Sfrondilo) was a high-ranking Byzantine courtier who became governor of Antioch, and then Apulia and Calabria.

== Biography ==
A court eunuch and favourite of Constantine VIII (r. 1025–28), Spondyles was among the coterie of court officials appointed to senior positions on Constantine's accession as sole emperor. In 1027, as the emir of Aleppo, Salih ibn Mirdas, raided Byzantine territory. Spondyles, although inexperienced in warfare, marched out to meet him, and was defeated and forced to withdraw to the safety of Antioch. Shortly after (in 1027/28) he was also tricked by the Arab tribal leader Nasr ibn Musharraf al-Rawadifi, who was captured by Michael's deputy, Pothos Argyros. Nasr persuaded Michael to release him and allow him to construct a fortress at al-Maniqa from where he would defend the Byzantine domains. Michael agreed and even sent a 1,000-strong garrison there, but when the fortress was finished, Nasr refused to hand it over, and with assistance from the emir of Tripoli and the local Fatimid commander, killed the garrison.

In July 1029, Michael resolved to attack Aleppo, despite having no authorisation from Emperor Romanos III (r. 1028–34) and disregarding the pleas of the Mirdasid brothers Shibl al-Dawla Nasr and Mu'izz al-Dawla Thimal to maintain the peace. In the event, he was caught in an ambush at Kaybar and his camp was raided by the Arabs, after which he retreated and concluded a treaty with the Mirdasids. Following these failures, he was dismissed by Romanos III, who resolved to campaign in Syria in person, sending his brother-in-law Constantine Karantenos ahead with some troops to replace Michael Spondyles. In the event, however, the emperor's own campaign would result in a humiliating defeat.

Michael (called Sphrondeles by the Latin historians) re-appears in 1038, when he joined George Maniakes in his Sicilian expedition. He probably replaced Constantinos Opos as catepan before Nikephoros Doukeianos could take over the post the next year (1039).

== Sources ==
- G.H. Pertz, Lupus protospatharius, Monumenta Germaniae historica, Scriptores V, Hannover 1844, 52-63
- Thurn, Hans, ed. (1973). Ioannis Scylitzae Synopsis historiarum. Berlin-New York: De Gruyter. ISBN 9783110022858.
- I. Kratchkovsky, F. Micheau, G. Troupeau, Histoire de Yahya ibn Sa’id d’Antioche, Patrologia Orientalis 47.4 (no.212), Turnhout 1997

Preceded by Constantine Opos	Catepan of Italy; 1038–1039	Succeeded by Nikephoros Doukeianos
Preceded by Constantine Dalassenos	Doux of Antioch; 1026–1029/30	Succeeded by Constantine Karantenos
