= Sunqur al-Ashqar =

Mamluk viceroy of Damascus (1279-1280)

Shams al-Din Sunqur al-Ashqar al-Salihi (Arabic: شمس الدين سنقر الأشقر الصالحي; c. 1223–1293) was the Mamluk viceroy of Damascus in 1279–1280, who attempted to rule Syria independently, in a rebellion against the Egypt-based sultan Qalawun (r. 1279–1290). While the rebellion in Damascus was quashed in 1280, Sunqur ensconced himself in the Sahyun Castle in the coastal mountains of northern Syria. He joined Qalawun in the successful defense of Syria against the Ilkhanid Mongols at the Battle of Homs in 1281. He remained in a state of peaceful relations with the sultan, despite ruling his coastal principality independently.

Sunqur's rule came to an end with the capture of Sahyun by Qalawun's deputy Turuntay in 1287. Sunqur returned to Cairo, where he was given the highest military ranks and considerable honors and benefits by Qalawun. The latter's son and successor, al-Ashraf Khalil (r. 1290–1293) imprisoned Sunqur and had him executed in 1293 for defying his orders to hand over part of the wealth he ended up controlling after the sultan's earlier execution of Turuntay.

== Early career ==
Sunqur was nicknamed al-Ashqar al-Rumi (lit. 'the blond, the Greek'). He was born around 1223 and was an ethnic Mongol. He was a mamluk (slave soldier) of al-Salih Ayyub (r. 1240–1249), the Ayyubid sultan of Egypt, who appointed him to the Bahriyya (adj. 'Bahri'), a mamluk regiment based in Roda Island in the capital Cairo. The Bahri mamluks were part of the large Salihiyya corps, i.e. the mamluks of al-Salih Ayyub. During this period, he became acquainted with another Bahri mamluk, the future Mamluk sultan Qalawun. The Ayyubids of Egypt were toppled by their mamluks in 1250, inaugurating the Mamluk state. Sunqur and Qalawun were associates of the powerful deputy of Mamluk sultan Aybak (r. 1250–1257), Faris al-Din Aktay. When the latter was murdered in the Bahri citadel on Aybak's orders in 1254, Sunqur and Qalawun fled the citadel for Ayyubid Syria.

During their time in Syria, the Bahri exiles became divided, with one faction, including Sunqur, defecting to the Ayyubid emir of al-Karak, al-Mughith Khidr, while the other, led by Baybars, joined the Ayyubid emir of Damascus, al-Nasir Yusuf. The defectors to Khidr were eventually imprisoned by al-Nasir Yusuf, but during the Mongol invasion of Syria, Sunqur was freed by the Mongols, who conquered the Ayyubid principalities there and made Sunqur their honored guest. Baybars, by now having returned to Egypt under the new sultan Qutuz, led the Mamluk victory against the Mongols in Syria at the Battle of Ain Jalut, capturing most of the region in 1260. Six years later, during the Battle of Mari against the Cilician Armenians, Baybars captured Leo II, a son of their king, Hethoum, and used him to ransom Sunqur from the Mongols, who were allies of the Armenians. Sunqur initially reacted with hesitation at the prospect of being released to Baybars, as he feared punishment for his previous defection from him during their service with the Ayyubids. According to the historian Linda Northrup, the effort to release Sunqur was an indication of the high regard Baybars held for him.

Along with another Bahri mamluk, Badr al-Din al-Baysari, Sunqur became the most devoted loyalist of Baybars, who had acceded as sultan in late 1260, with Sunqur and al-Baysari referred to in the sources as "the two wings" of Baybars. Baybars built a house for Sunqur next to his own in Cairo in 1267. While its location and specific descriptions of its structure do not exist, it contained an iwan, majlis (private reception room) and a type of qa'a (roofed reception area) called a hurmiyya.

Baybars was succeeded by his son, al-Sa'id Baraka (r. 1277–1279). Sunqur and al-Baysari practically ran the Mamluk state in the immediate aftermath of Baybars's death. Advised by his upstart emirs to assert his sultanic authority, al-Sa'id had them both arrested. This caused major controversy among the mamluks, with higher-ranking emirs confronting the sultan to reverse course. Al-Sa'id soon after freed Sunqur and al-Baysari. Sunqur eventually gained the good graces of al-Sa'id's khushdashiyya, who supported his promotion to the office of viceroy of the sultan. This was probably due to Sunqur's willingness to allow al-Sa'id's loyalists to pilfer the state coffers in exchange for their support. Sunqur served as an envoy for al-Sa'id with other senior mamluks, such as Qalawun and one of the sultan's disaffected viceroys, Kunduk.

== Viceroy of Syria ==
=== Appointment and sultanic ambitions ===
Sunqur resented al-Sa'id, believing himself better suited to rule than the young sultan. He essentially defected, when he refused to accompany him back to Cairo. Al-Sa'id died soon after and was succeeded by his brother Solamish, who was seven years old at the time. Sunqur did not act on his ambitions for power, preferring to wait out events. When Qalawun became the atabek al-asakir (commander-in-chief), and thus the practical ruler of the sultanate, Sunqur joined his entourage. He was appointed viceroy of Damascus, the second highest-ranking post in the sultanate, in September 1279. Soon after Sunqur arrived to assume office in Damascus, Qalawun had been elevated to sultan.

While the office of viceroy of Syria brought Sunqur control over substantial wealth, fortresses, and troops, as well as eminence among the other mamluks, he probably viewed the appointment as a move by Qalawun to sideline him from the center of power in Cairo and remove him as a potential rival to the sultanate. He viewed himself more worthy of the throne. His dissatisfaction was reflected in his absence from Qalawun's coronation ceremony, whilst all other senior mamluks attended. Nevertheless, in December 1279, Qalawun's name was pronounced in the Friday prayer sermons in Syria's cities, a formal recognition of his sultanate in Sunqur's domains.

=== Rebellion in Damascus ===
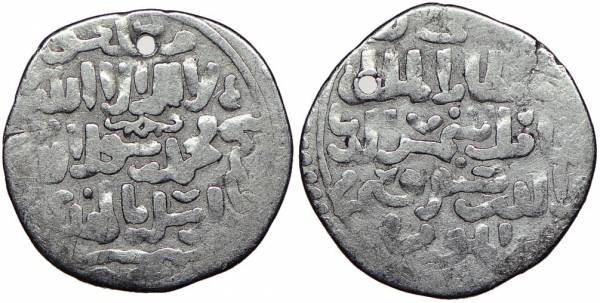
A dirham minted in Damascus during the reign of Sunqur al-Ashqar

Under the Ayyubids, Syrian territories had been ruled by members of the dynasty, who viewed themselves as equals of their relative, the sultan of Egypt. They frequently attempted to rule independently, a pattern continued by the early Mamluks. Qalawun's toppling of Solamish in Cairo was viewed as an opportunity by Sunqur to act as sovereign in Syria.

Sunqur responded favorably to the invitation by al-Mughith Khidr to join the Syrian opposition to Qalawun. In early 1280, Sunqur declared himself independent by adopting the regnal title al-Malik al-Kamil, leading a royal procession in Damascus, and having his name read in the Friday prayer sermons. He proposed to Qalawun that he be left to control the region between al-Arish and the Euphrates valley. He did not advocate secession from the state, but an autonomy of the kind enjoyed by the Ayyubid emir of Hama, a principality spared full absorption by the Mamluk state.

Qalawun initially responded by diplomatic means, sending Salihi emissaries to appeal to the khushdashiyya (brotherly solidarity) between Sunqur and Qalawun and invite the former back to obedience. Sunqur maintained his rebellion, attracting the other Salihi mamluks in Damascus to his side. Qalawun dispatched a small force to Palestine, which engaged with a small troop loyal to Sunqur in Gaza. Sunqur's men were put to flight, regrouping in Ramla. A larger force, numbering 6,000 men, was sent by Qalawun against Damascus, likely with the intention to intimidate Sunqur into submission. Sunqur gained a fatwa from the scholar Ibn Khallikan of Damascus, permitting him to challenge the Egyptian army. Sunqur gathered 14,000 mamluks and other troops from across Syria, especially from the Mamluk governors of Aleppo and Baalbek, the Ayyubid governor of Hama, and the Al Fadl Bedouin Arabs of the Syrian steppe under Isa ibn Muhanna. Despite their greater numbers, most defected to the Egyptian army during a confrontation at al-Jassora in June 1280. Sunqur, while having fought with distinction, was deprived of his mamluk troops and retreated with the Bedouins of Isa ibn Muhanna and a small coterie of loyalists to the fortress of al-Rahba, along the Euphrates. Damascus surrendered to Qalawun's forces after securing an aman (guarantee of safety). Sunqur was formally replaced as na'ib al-saltana of Damascus by one of his former prisoners, the mamluk Lajin.

== Control of Sahyun ==
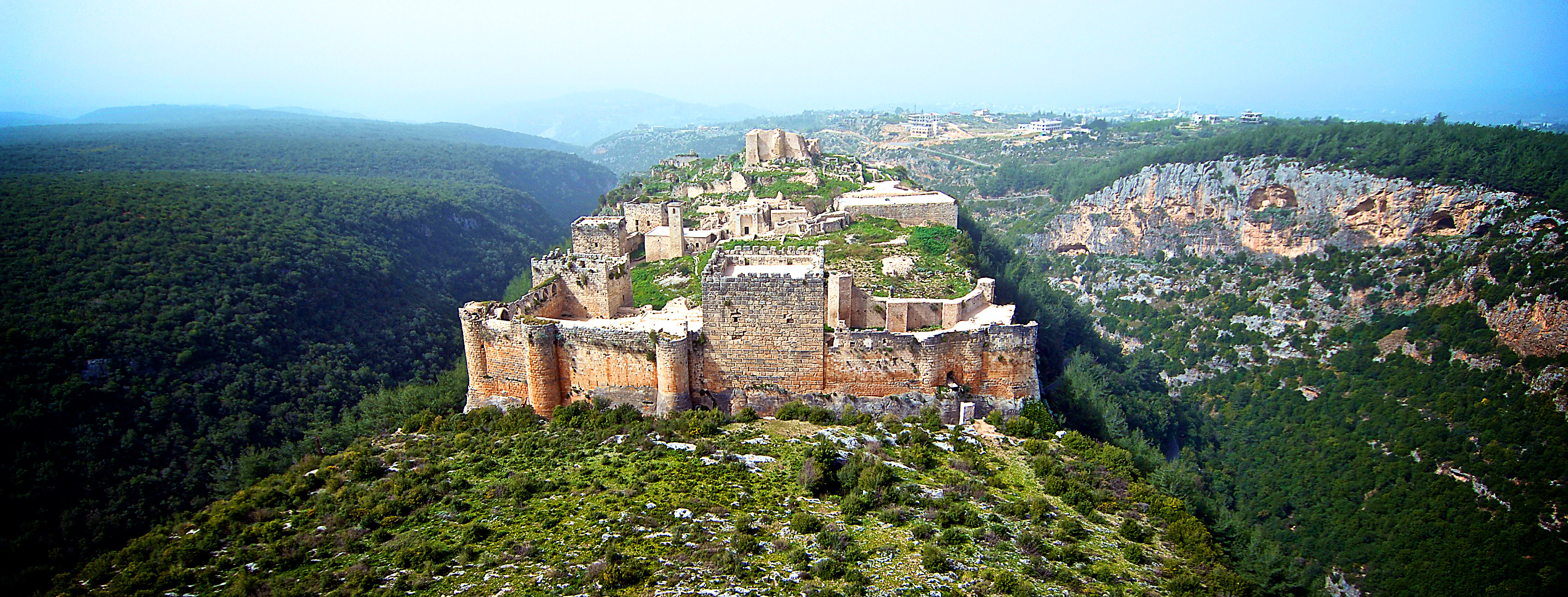
The Sahyun Castle

Mamluk troops soon after pursued Sunqur, who thereafter left Isa ibn Muhanna's company in the Syrian desert for refuge in the castle of Sahyun, near the Crusader-held port city of Latakia in the northern coastal mountains of Syria. At Sahyun, Sunqur corresponded with the Mongols, promising to join with their forces in the event of a Mongol invasion. However, when the Mongols invaded Syria in late 1280, Sunqur threw in his lot with the Mamluks. Several versions explaining Sunqur's motives exist, including requests by Qalawun's envoys to present a united front against the Mongols and beratement by Isa ibn Muhanna or Sufi sheikhs to not defect from Islam by joining the Mongols at his old age. In any case, Sunqur and his relatively small detachment of troops joined the Mamluk army assembled at Hama, but without integrating under its command. The Mongols captured Aleppo, which had been abandoned by its inhabitants and Mamluk garrison, but withdrew two days later, after which the Muslim troops at Hama pursued them. The Mongols' abandonment of their invasion was ascribed by the sources to the unexpected defection of Sunqur, the assembly of a large Mamluk force at Hama, or the demonstration of power by Qalawun. Following this event, more of Sunqur's men defected to Qalawun.

After Qalawun executed Kunduk and other leading emirs in reaction to an assassination plot against him, another leading emir, Aytamish al-Sa'di, defected to Sunqur at Sahyun with 300 of his horsemen. In the meantime, Sunqur had gained the defection of the Mamluk emir of Shaizar fortress, to the west of Hama. The fortress was assaulted by Qalawun's troops and its commander died. Negotiations ensued between Qalawun and Sunqur, whereby it was agreed that Sunqur would surrender Shaizar in return for a pardon and continued control over Sahyun as an iqta (akin to a fief). After this agreement was struck, Mongol armies under Manku Timur invaded northern Syria. Qalawun hurried to confront the challenge, setting up camp with the emirs of the Mamluk armies of Egypt and Syria at a site near Homs. Qalawun summoned Sunqur to join the effort, which he complied with in return for promises that he would be allowed to return to Sahyun. His arrival, along with that of Aytamish, at the sultan's camp significantly boosted the morale of the Mamluk troops. The Mongols were routed at the battle outside Homs, forcing their retreat from Syria. Sunqur was allowed to return to Sahyun.

In May 1285, Qalawun captured Margat, a Crusader fortress in the coastal mountain south of Sahyun. He proceeded against the Crusaders further, capturing from them the nearby inland fort of Bulunyas and the island fortress of Maraclea. Marqab was preserved and garrisoned. These developments enabled him to focus on finally subduing Sunqur at Sahyun. In 1286/1287 the sultan commissioned his deputy, Turuntay, to besiege Sahyun. Turuntay arrived in early 1287, offering Sunqur the opportunity to surrender peacefully in return for the sultan's pardon. He refused, but relented after the assault against the fortress commenced. Sunqur surrendered Sahyun and its satellite fortresses in April or May 1287.

== Return to Cairo and later career ==
Sunqur arrived with Turuntay in Cairo afterward, where he received a grand reception by Qalawun, his sons, the family of Baybars, the Mamluk armies, the leading emirs and his fellow Salihi mamluks. The sultan gave him the highest rank, amir mi'a, muqaddam alf (emir of one hundred cavalry, commander of one thousand mamluks). He was given the prestigious honor of quarters in the Cairo Citadel, the seat of the empire, and became an adviser and friend of the sultan, who continued to treat him honorably through the end of his reign in 1290. According to Northrup, Qalawun's "magnanimous" treatment of Sunqur and other senior rivals "was not entirely altruistic". As the sultan still lacked full support among the mamluk factions, he aimed to gain their goodwill by giving Sunqur and the sons of Baybars considerable freedom and benefits.

Sunqur initially enjoyed close ties with Qalawun's successor, his son al-Ashraf Khalil (r. 1290–1293), who promised to restore to him the fortress of Sahyun. When Turuntay, the second-in-command to the sultan, ran afoul of al-Ashraf Khalil, Sunqur inherited his position. However, Clifford holds this favor "spoiled him as it had Turuntay". Wary of Sunqur overstepping his power, al-Ashraf Khalil ordered him to surrender some of the assets of Turuntay, which Sunqur rejected. After initial hesitation to act against Sunqur, al-Ashraf Khalil was persuaded by his advisers to imprison Sunqur. He was executed in 1293.

== Bibliography ==
- Balog, Paul (1969). "A dirhem of Al-Kāmil Shams Al-Dīn Sunqur, rebel sultān of Syria, hitherto unrecorded in numismatics (679 H.=1280 A.D.)". Revue Numismatique. 6 (11): 296–299. doi:10.3406/numi.1969.991.
- Clifford, Winslow William (2013). Conermann, Stephan (ed.). State formation and the structure of politics in Mamluk Syro-Egypt, 648–741 A.H./1250–1340 C.E. Bonn University Press: V and R Unipress. ISBN 978-3-8471-0091-1.
- Northrup, Linda S. (1998). From Slave to Sultan: The Career of Al-Manṣūr Qalāwūn and the Consolidation of Mamluk Rule in Egypt and Syria (678–689 A.H./1279–1290 A.D.). Franz Steiner. ISBN 3-515-06861-9.
- Rabbat, Nasser O. (1995). The Citadel of Cairo: A New Interpretation of Royal Mamluk Architecture. Leiden: Brill. ISBN 90-04-10124-1.
- Yosef, Koby (2022). "The Names of the Mamluks: Ethnic Groups and Ethnic Solidarity in the Mamluk Sultanate (648-922, 1250-1517)". In Levanoni, Amalia (ed.). Egypt and Syria under Mamluk Rule: Political, Social and Cultural Aspects. Leiden: Brill. pp. 59–118. ISBN 978-90-04-45951-9.
