= Cassano all'Ionio =

- Comune
- Comune di Cassano all'Ionio
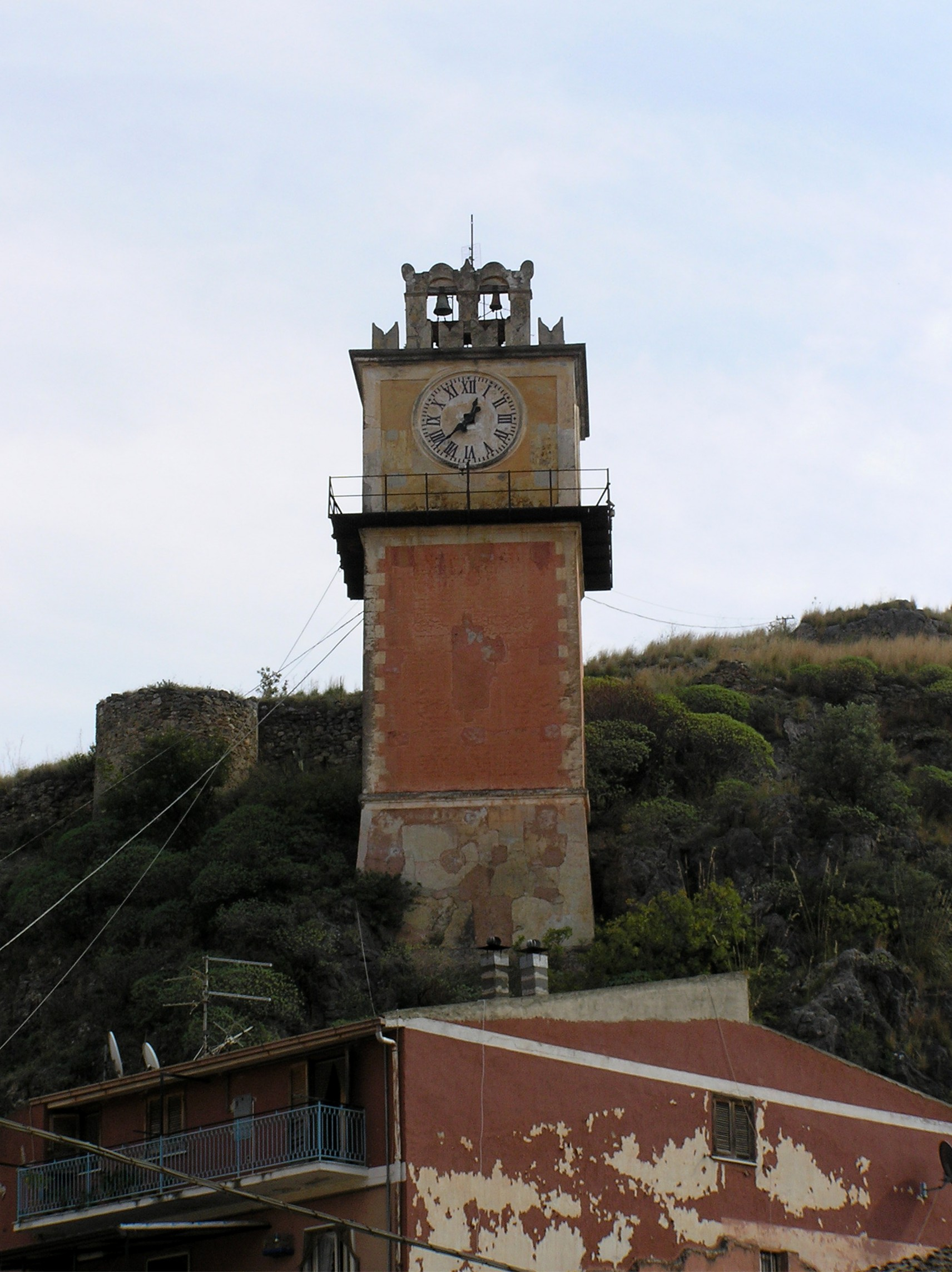
- Clock tower in Cassano

- Coat of arms

- Location within Italy Location within Calabria
- Coordinates: 39°47′N 16°19′E
- Country: Italy
- Region: Calabria
- Province: Cosenza (CS)
- Frazioni: Doria, Lauropoli, Sibari

Government
  - Mayor: None (commissars)

Area
  - Total: 159.07 km^{2} (61.42 sq mi)
- Elevation: 250 m (820 ft)

Population (December 2013)
  - Total: 18,652
  - Density: 117.26/km^{2} (303.69/sq mi)
- Demonym: Cassanesi
- Time zone: UTC+1 (CET)
  - Summer (DST): UTC+2 (CEST)
- Postal code: 87011
- Dialing code: 0981
- Patron saint: Holy Crucifix
- Saint day: First Friday in March
- Website: Official website

Cassano all'Ionio, also named Cassano allo Ionio, is a town and comune in the province of Cosenza in Calabria, southern Italy, known in Roman times as Cassanum. It lies in a fertile region in the concave recess of a steep mountain, 60 km northeast of the town of Cosenza, 10 km west of the archaeological site of Sybaris.

== History ==
Cassano was the site of a great Saracen defeat of the Byzantine forces in Italy under Pothos in 1031.

The diocese of Cassano was first mentioned in 1059.

== Main sites ==
The rock above the city is crowned by a medieval castle commanding beautiful views. Its tower was believed to be that from which the stone was thrown that killed Milo, but that may be due to an erroneous identification of the town. There are warm sulfurous springs here, which have been used for baths.

The archaeological site of Sybaris, located near the modern town of Sibari, is part of the comune of Cassano all'Ionio.

There is a train station for Cassano all'Ionio, in the frazione of Doria.

== People ==
- Frank Costello (1891-1973), crime boss, head of the Luciano crime family
