= Pothos Argyros (11th century) =

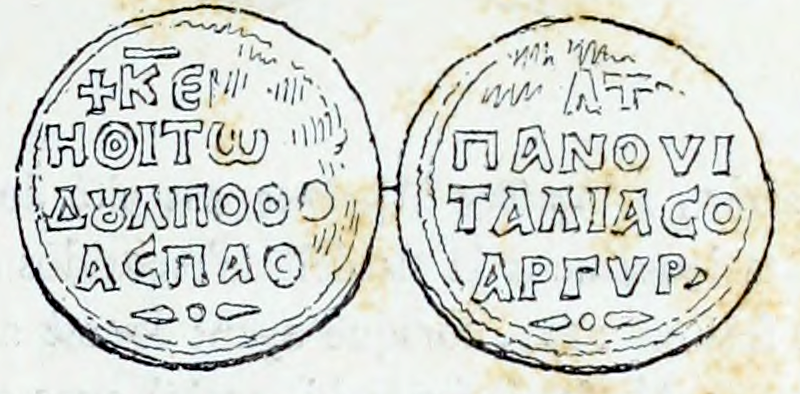
Seal of Pothos Argyros, with his titles of protospatharios and katepano of Italy

Pothos Argyros or Argyrus (Greek: Πόθος Ἀργυρός; Italian: Potone Argiro or Poto Argiro) was a Byzantine commander, who served as the catepan of Italy during the eventful years of 1029 to 1031.

Pothos is first mentioned in the history of John Skylitzes in c. 1026/27, or perhaps still under Basil II (r. 976–1025), as a commander in the eastern frontier, when he captured the Arab chieftain Nasr ibn Musharraf al-Rawadifi, ruler of the disputed border area of Jabal Rawadif near Antioch. Nasr succeeded in being set free after promising assistance to Pothos' superior, the doux of Antioch, Michael Spondyles.

Following the rise to the throne of Romanos III Argyros (r. 1028–1034), Pothos was appointed Catepan of Italy in 1029. Pothos' relation to Romanos III is unknown, but according to the historians Jean-Claude Ceynet and Jean-François Vannier, he may have been his nephew. A surviving lead seal of office gives his titles as "protospatharios and katepano [catepan] of Italy".

According to Lupus Protospatharius, he arrived at Bari as the new Catepan of Italy in July 1029, and immediately fought in its vicinity against the Muslim commander Rayca, who had previously forced the capitulation of the fortress of Obbianum (probably modern Uggiano). Lupus then reports that in 1031 (or 1032, according to some modern interpretations), he faced another invasion by the Emirate of Sicily. The Italian chroniclers report that the Muslims sacked Cassano in June, and that, hurrying to confront them, on 3 July, Pothos Argyros was defeated and killed.

Pothos' death in battle is not entirely certain, however, since an inventory of the metropolitan see of Reggio di Calabria includes a set of panegyrics offered by kyr Pothos and his wife, both related to a possession of a katepanissa Theoktiste. An identification of Theoktiste with the wife of kyr Pothos, and of Pothos with the catepan is very likely, but the copyist of the works recorded that this was done in 1033/34, "during the times of catepan Pothos, under the reign of Romanos and Zoe", by which time Pothos is supposed to have been dead.

== Sources ==
- Cheynet, J.-C.; Vannier, J.-F. (2003). "Les Argyroi". Zbornik Radova Vizantološkog Instituta (in French). 40: 57–90. doi:10.2298/ZRVI0340057C. ISSN 0584-9888.
- Felix, Wolfgang (1981). Byzanz und die islamische Welt im früheren 11. Jahrhundert (in German). Vienna: Verlag der Österreichischen Akademie der Wissenschaften. ISBN 9783700103790.
- Wortley, John, ed. (2010). John Skylitzes: A Synopsis of Byzantine History, 811–1057. Cambridge: Cambridge University Press. ISBN 978-0-521-76705-7.

Preceded by Christophoros Burgaris	Catepan of Italy; 1029–1031	Succeeded by Michael Protospatharios
