= Sahyun Castle =

Medieval castle in northwestern Syria

Qalʿat Ṣalāḥ al-Dīn
- قلعة صلاح الدين
- Near Al-Haffah, Latakia Governorate, Syria
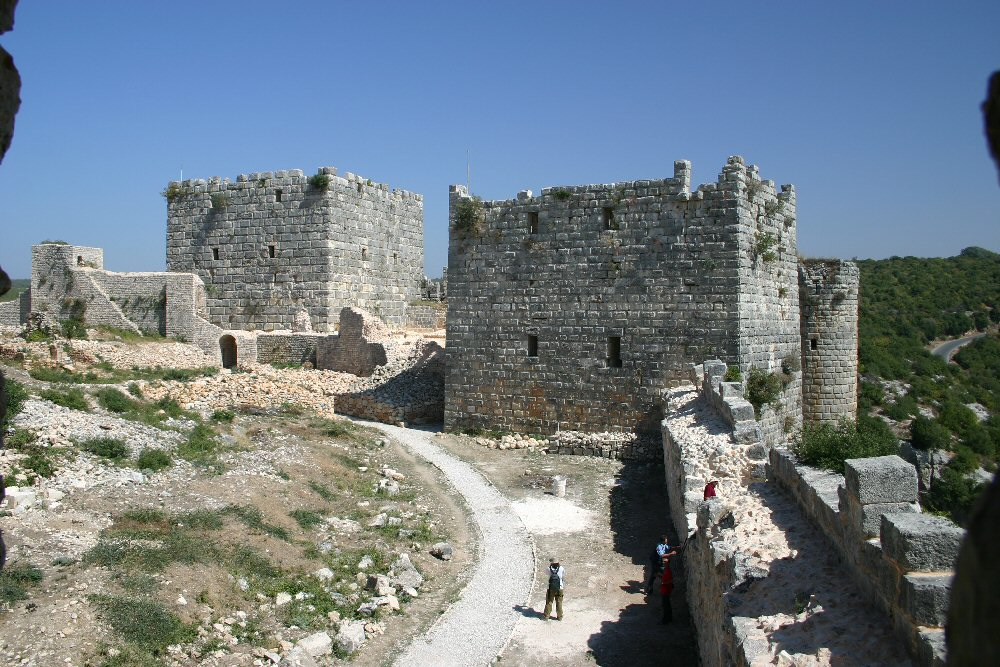
- The south bastion with donjons

Site information
- Type: Castle
- Owner: Syrian government
- Open to the public: Yes
- Condition: Partially ruined

Location
- Location within Syria
- Coordinates: 35°35′45″N 36°03′26″E

Site history
- Materials: Limestone

UNESCO World Heritage Site
- Type: Cultural
- Criteria: ii, vi
- Designated: 2006 (30th session)
- Part of: Crac des Chevaliers and Qal’at Salah El-Din
- Reference no.: 1229
- Region: Arab States

Sahyun Castle (Arabic: قلعة صهيون, romanized: Qalʿat Ṣihyawn, lit. 'Zion Castle'), known as Saone Castle in the Crusader period and renamed to Castle of Saladin (Arabic: قلعة صلاح الدين, romanized: Qalʿat Ṣalāḥ al-Dīn) in 1957, is a medieval castle in northwestern Syria. It is located 7 km east of Al-Haffah town and 30 km east of the city of Latakia, in high mountainous terrain on a ridge between two deep ravines and surrounded by forest, the site has been fortified since at least the mid 10th century. In 975 the Byzantine Emperor John I Tzimiskes captured the site and it remained under Byzantine control until around 1108. Early in the 12th century the Franks assumed control of the site and it was part of the newly formed Crusader state of the Principality of Antioch. The Crusaders undertook an extensive building programme, giving the castle much of its current appearance. In 1188 it fell to the forces of Saladin after a three-day siege. The castle was again besieged in 1287, this time both defender and belligerent were Mamluks. In 2006, the castles of Qal'at Salah El-Din and Krak des Chevaliers were recognised as a World Heritage Site by UNESCO. The site is owned by the Syrian government.

== Location and name ==
The castle is located roughly 25 kilometers (16 mi) northeast of Latakia. The castle is close to the town of al-Haffah. The traditional name of the site is Ṣahyūn, the Arabic equivalent of Zion. This, according to historian Hugh N. Kennedy, is why it has now been given the more "politically correct" title of Qalʿat Ṣalāḥ al-Dīn, meaning "Saladin's Castle". This occurred in 1957, after the Suez War and as a consequence of it, and in memory of Saladin's 1188 capture of Saone Castle. The Byzantines referred to it as Sigon and their Frankish successors called it Saone in modern French: Saône.

== History ==
The Levant in 1135, with Crusader states marked by a red cross

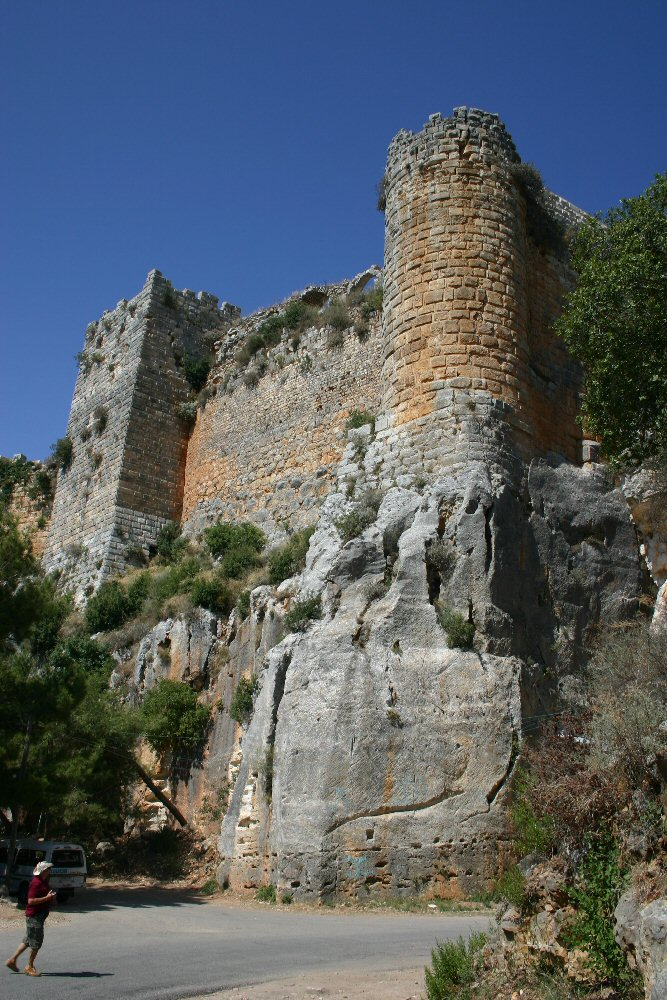
Qal'at Salah al-Din

The site has been fortified since at least the mid-10th century, and its first known occupant was a dependent of the Aleppo-based Hamdanid emir, Sayf al-Dawla. The Byzantine emperor John I Tzimiskes captured Sahyun in 975 from its Hamdanid ruler, and it remained under Byzantine control until around 1108 when the Crusaders took control of Latakia, at which point it is likely they also took possession of Sahyun. It was part of the Principality of Antioch, one of the four Crusader states established after the First Crusade. The lords of Sahyun were among the most powerful in Antioch. The first lord of Sahyun was probably Robert the Leper, who is recorded in control of it since at least 1119. Sahyun remained in his family until 1188. It was most likely Robert or his son, William of Zardana, who built the Crusader castle around the previous Byzantine fortifications. Most of what is evident today was built at this time. The fortress was notable as being one of the few which were not entrusted to the major military orders of the Hospitaller and the Templars.

On 27 July 1188, the Ayyubid sultan Saladin and his son, az-Zahir Ghazi, arrived at Sahyun with an army and laid siege to the castle. The Muslim forces adopted two positions outside the castle: Saladin established himself with his siege engines on the plateau opposite the castle's east side while his son was set up facing the north of the castle's lower enclosure. Stones weighing between 50 and 300 kilograms (110 and 660 lb) hurled at the castle for two days, causing significant damage. On 29 July, the order to attack was given. Az-Zahir assaulted the castle town adjoining the castle's west, and the inhabitants sought refuge in the castle. The castle and town were supposed to be separated by a ditch, however at the north end the digging remained unfinished. Exploiting this, Az-Zahir successfully stormed the castle walls. The inner courtyard was overrun and the garrison retreated to the donjon or keep. Before the day ended they agreed terms with their attackers and were allowed to ransom themselves. Though Sahyun was a strong castle, it fell in just three days. Kennedy speculates that, despite being well-provisioned, the fortress may have surrendered been because its garrison was not large enough or possessed siege engines.

Saladin granted Sahyun and Bourzey to one of his emirs, Mankawar (also known as "Mankurus ibn Khumartigin"). The pair descended through the latter's heirs until 1272 when Sahyun was given to the Mamluk sultan Baibars. Some time in the 1280s, the dissident Mamluk emir Sunqur al-Ashqar used the castle for refuge from Sultan Qalawun. Under Sunqur, the castle became the administrative center of a small semi-independent emirate. In late 1286 and early 1287, Qalawun set out to repress his rivals which including curtailing Sunqur's independence. To this end the sultan sent an army under the command of Turuntay to establish a siege at Sahyun. Turuntay sent a message to Sunqur, saying that if he surrendered the sultan would pardon him; Sunqur refused and so the siege began. It soon became apparent that Sunqur's men could not hold the castle, and so in April he surrendered.

Afterward, Sahyun was made part of the province of Tripoli. The castle remained significant and prosperous under the Mamluks until at least the late 14th century. The emir of Hama, Abu'l-Fida (r. 1273–1331), noted that a town was established adjacent to Sahyun. In later decades, however, Sahyun was abandoned.

After the Ottoman conquest in Syria, Sahyun became an Ottoman fortress. A 16th century Chinese text's description of a "city with two walls" between Tartus and Aleppo seems to match the citadel Sahyun.

In early 20th century, T. E. Lawrence visited the castle, and describe it as "the most sensational thing in castle building I have ever seen."

The citadel was made a World Heritage Site by UNESCO, along with Krak des Chevaliers, in 2006. During the Syrian Revolution which began in 2011 UNESCO voiced concerns that the conflict might lead to the damage of important cultural sites such as Citadel of Salah Ed-Din. As of 2016 the castle survived the Syrian Civil War without any significant damage. In 2023, one of the fortified towers was destroyed during the February earthquake.

== Overview ==
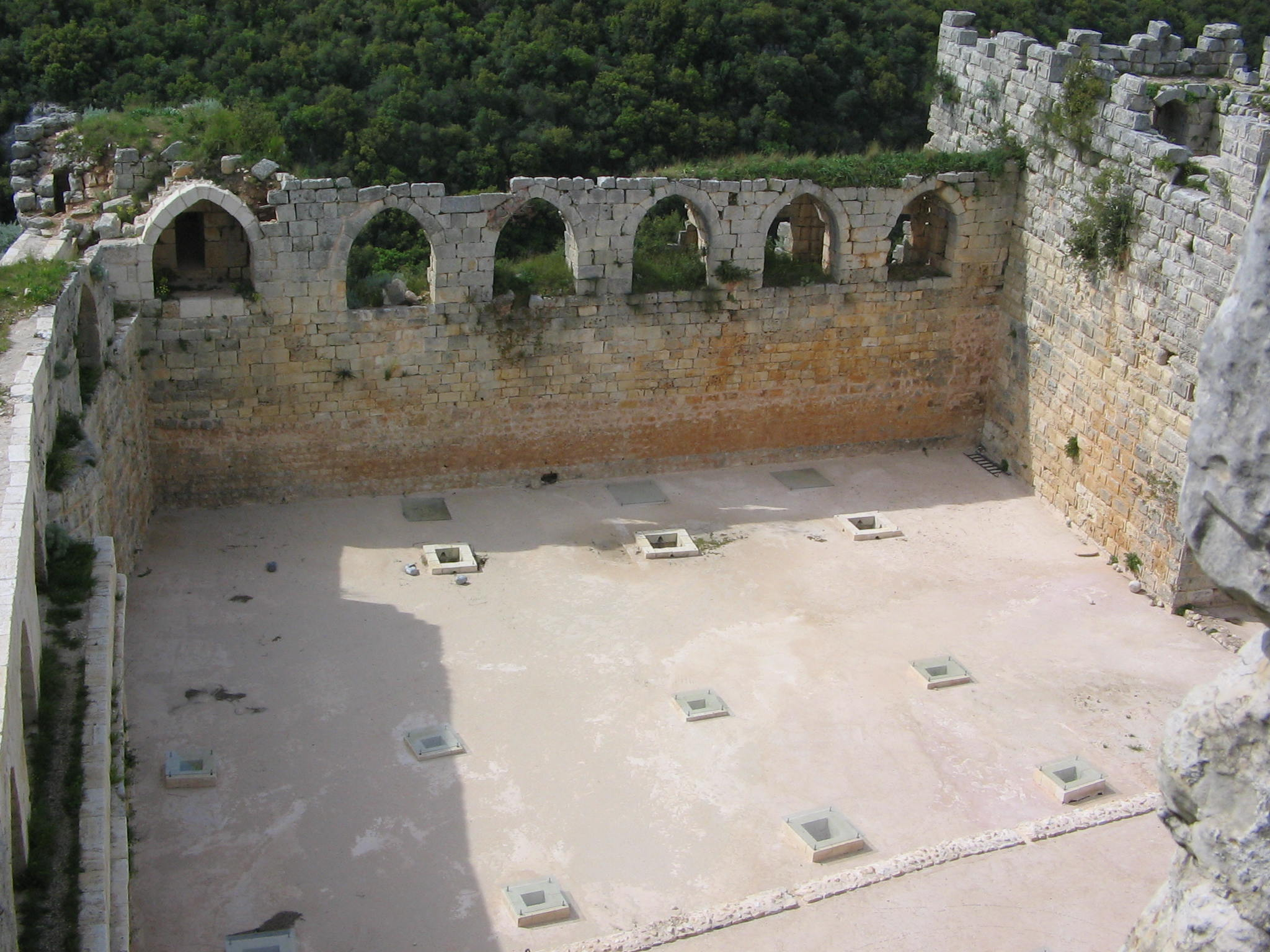
Inner view

Sahyun was built on a ridge some 700 metres (2,300 ft) long between two deep gorges. It guarded the route between Latakia and the city of Antioch. The spur on which the castle is built is connected to a plateau in the east. The Byzantines defended the site by building a wall across the east side of the ridge. The walls created an irregular enclosure and were studded with flanking towers. Adjacent to the fortification, at the eastern end of the ridge was a settlement. One of the most magnificent features of the fortress is the 28 m deep ditch, which was cut into living rock. The creation of the ditch has been attributed to the Byzantines. This ditch, which runs 156 meters along the east side, is 14 to 20 meters wide and has a lonely 28 m high needle to support the drawbridge.

The entrance to the castle is through an entrance on the south side of the fortress. On the right of the entrance is a tower, a bastion built by the Crusaders. There is another a few meters further. There is a cistern for water storage and some stables just next to a massive keep that overlooks the ditch. This keep has walls of 5 m thick and it covers an area of nearly 24 m^{2}. Further on to the north is the gate where the drawbridge used to be. Also evident are the Byzantine citadel, located at the center of the fortress, another large cistern, the Crusader tea house, and a Crusader church adjoining one of two Byzantine chapels. As for the Arab additions to the fortress, they include a mosque, which dates back to Qalawun's reign, and a palace, which includes baths with courtyards and iwans. This has been slightly restored.

== Gallery ==
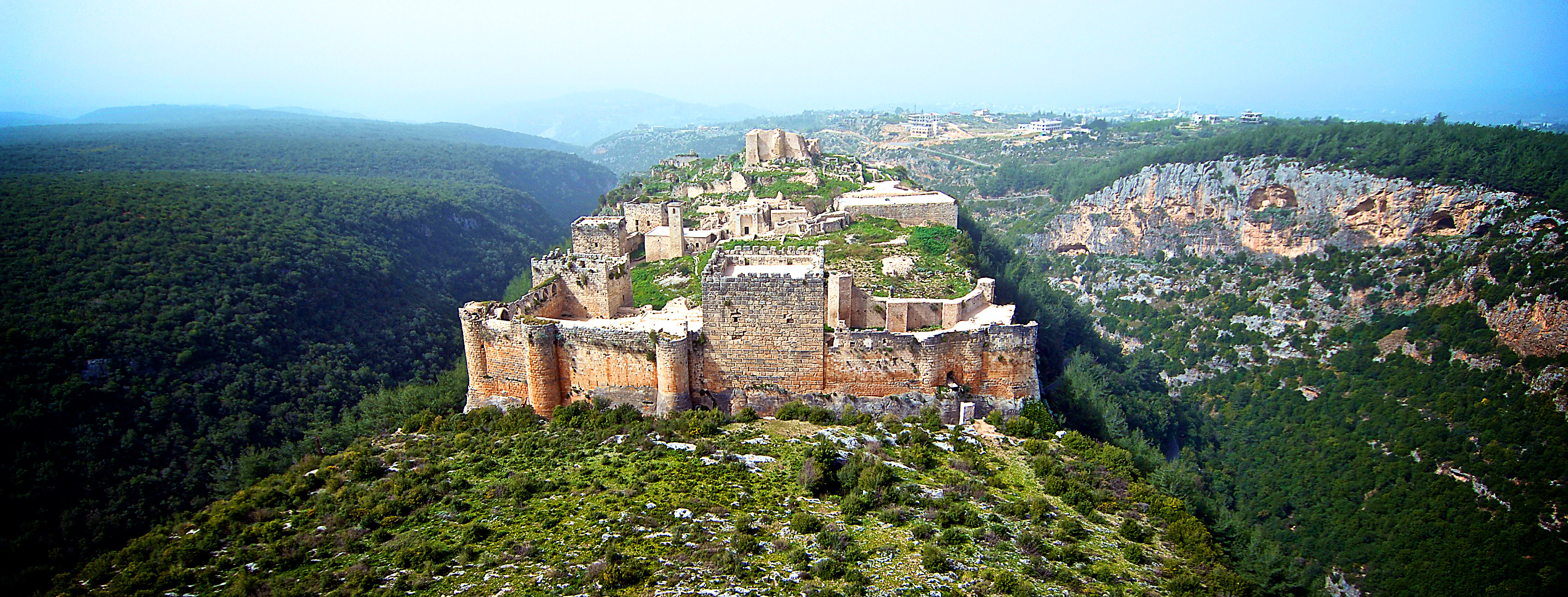
A panorama view of Sahyun Castle.

== See also ==
- List of Crusader castles
- List of castles in Syria
- World Heritage Sites in Danger

== Bibliography ==
- Folda, Jaroslav (2005), Crusader Art in the Holy Land: From the Third Crusade to the Fall of Acre, 1187–1291, Cambridge: Cambridge University Press, ISBN 978-0-521-83583-1
- Kennedy, Hugh (1994), Crusader Castles, Cambridge: Cambridge University Press, ISBN 0-521-42068-7
- Molin, Kristian (2001), Unknown Crusader Castles, London: Continuum, ISBN 978-1-85285-261-0
- Morray, D. W. (1995), "Ṣahyūn", in Bosworth, C.E.; van Donzel, E.; Heinrichs, W. P.; Pellat, Ch. (eds.), The Encyclopedia of Islam, vol. VIII: Ned–Sam (new ed.), Leiden and New York: Brill, pp. 850–851, ISBN 90-04-09834-8
