= Oppo (disambiguation) =

Oppo is a Chinese electronics manufacturer.

Oppo or OPPO may also refer to:

== People ==
- Cipriano Efisio Oppo (1891–1962), Italian painter
- Franco Oppo (1935–2016), Italian composer
- Stefano Oppo (born 1994), Italian Olympic rower

== Other uses ==
- Oppo Digital, an independently operated overseas division of BBK Electronics (parent of Oppo), manufacturing audio and video equipment
- Opposition research, a term used in political campaigning
- Opposite field, a term used in baseball
- Opposite lock
- Oppo Rancisis, a character from Star Wars
