= Battle of al-Jassora =

Battle between the Egyptian Sultanate and Mamluk rebels

| Date | 18 June 1280 |
| Location | al-Jassora, near Damascus, Syria |
| Result | Mamluk victory |

Belligerents
| Mamluk Sultanate | Sunqur al-Ashqar loyalists Arab tribes |

Commanders and leaders
| Alam al-Din Sanjar; Izz al-Din al-Afram | Sunqur al-Ashqar; Isa ibn Muhanna; Shihab al-Din ibn Hajji |

Strength
| ~6,000 | ~14,000 |

The battle of al-Jassora (Egyptian Arabic: معركة الجسورة) took place on 18 June 1280 in the al-Jassora region in Syria between the Egyptian army led by Emir Alam al-Din Sanjar and a Levantine army led by Sunqur al-Ashqar, the ruler in the name of al-Malik al-Kamil, supported by the Arab princes Shihab al-Din ibn Hajji and Sharaf al-Din ibn Muhanna.

== Background ==
Immediately after the rise of the Mamluk Sultan al-Mansur Seif al-Din Qalawun to rule the Mamluk Sultanate of Egypt, the Viceroy of Damascus, Emir Sunqur al-Ashqar, rebelled against him and wanted independence for Syria as a sultanate independent of Egypt. He declared himself as Sultan of Syria under the title of al-Malik al-Kamil, in imitation of the Egyptian Sultans in Cairo and led a royal procession in Damascus, and having his name read in the Friday prayers sermons.

Sunqur al-Ashqar was not satisfied with that. He also sent his Levantine army and entered Gaza, which is at the gate of Egypt. Sunqur allied at that time with the Arab tribes in Gaza and the Levant. When Qalawun learned of the entry of the Levantine forces into Gaza, he ordered the Egyptian army to go out to fight the Levantine army and pursue it into its homeland in Damascus and put down the attempt to secede the Levant from the Mamluk Sultanate of Egypt.

The Egyptian army went out and met the Levantine army of al-Ashqar in Gaza. At the beginning, the Levantines repelled the Egyptians, but in the end the Egyptians won an overwhelming victory, and the remnants of the Levantine army withdrew to the Ramla region in Palestine, so the Egyptian armies advanced towards Ramla, and there all the Levantine forces withdrew from Ramla towards Damascus.

== Battle ==
On June 11, Sunqur with the Levant's soldiers left Damascus and camped in al-Jassora and waited there until the Egyptian army numbering 6,000 men arrived on June 16 under the command of Emir Alam al-Din Sanjar. Two days later, on June 18, a battle broke out between the two armies at al-Jassora. At the beginning of the battle, al-Ashqar withstood the Egyptian attacks, but was surprised by the escape of the Damascus forces from the battlefield and their joining the Egyptians. In the midst of all this, before the battle, al-Ashqar had agreed with the Arab tribes led by Ibn Muhanna that they would attack the Egyptian army camps from behind and plunder them in order to occupy the Egyptians who would be dispersed, but the commander of the Egyptian army, Emir Alam al-Din Sanjar, was an experienced military commander, so he ordered the Egyptian forces not to look back, even if they saw that the Arabs were taking their clothes from their tents, thus foiling the plan of Sunqur al-Ashqar.

After that, the soldiers of Aleppo and Hama, along with the Arabs, and most of the soldiers of the Levant, fled from the battlefield to the point that the historian Ibn Taghribirdi says that the soldiers of the Levant hid in the orchards and gardens of Damascus, and among them were those who fled to Baalbek, so the rebellious emir Sunqur al-Ashqar remained alone on the battlefield and was defeated.

== Aftermath ==
After that, the Egyptian forces headed to the Citadel of Damascus and brought its people to safety. The people of Damascus were reassured and opened the doors, and no case of looting or any case of aggression was recorded by the Egyptian forces towards the people of Damascus, which makes it clear that the conflict was with Sunqur al-Ashqar as a person, and whoever followed him. A number of princes loyal to al-Ashqar came to the commanders of the Egyptian army and declared their loyalty to the Mamluk Sultanate of Egypt, represented by Sultan al-Mansur Seif al-Din Qalawun. Then 3,000 Egyptian soldiers went to arrest Sunqur al-Ashqar and the princes loyal to him and those who were still with him, and with them a decree from the Sultan of Egypt of safety for whoever would hand over themselves for justice.

Omens or messages were followed to Egypt with news of the Egyptian victory. Sultan al-Mansur Qalawun was very happy and ordered the decoration of Cairo and the major Egyptian cities. The long period of Qalawunid rule over Egypt began, which would continue for more than a century, most of which was a period of prosperity and glory that Egypt had not witnessed since ancient times.
