= John Raphael (catepan) =

John Raphael or Rafayl was the catepan of Italy from September to December 1046 AD. He replaced the catepan Eustathios Palatinos and arrived with an army of Varangian auxiliaries in Bari.

Because the Varangians were not well received by the people of Bari, John Raphael spent his governorship at Otranto. His term saw the rise of Argyrus as the Byzantine Empire's most successful general in Italy.

== Sources ==
- Jules Gay. L'Italie méridionale et l'empire Byzantin: Livre II. Burt Franklin: New York, 1904.

Preceded by Eustathios Palatinos	Catepan of Italy; 1046	Succeeded by Argyrus
