= Catepanate of Italy =

Province of the Byzantine Empire in the Italian Peninsula (965–1071)

Catepanate of Italy Κατεπανίκιον Ἰταλίας
- Province of the Byzantine Empire
- 965–1071
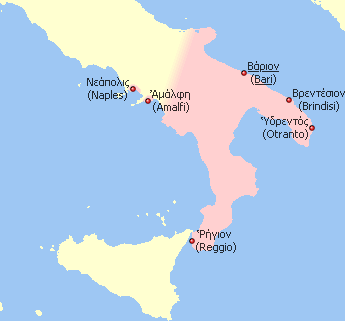
- Approximate territorial extent of the Catapanate of Italy during the early 11th century. Modern city names (in Italian, except from Napoli) are provided alongside the medieval Greek names.
- Capital: Bari
- Historical era: Middle Ages
  - Established: 965
  - Norman conquest of southern Italy: 1071
Preceded by
Longobardia
Principality of Salerno
Tyrrhenian duchies
Succeeded by
County of Apulia and Calabria
Duchy of Naples
- Today part of: Italy

The Catepanate of Italy (Greek: κατεπανίκιον Ἰταλίας, Katepaníkion Italías) was a province (theme) of the Byzantine Empire, that existed from c. 965 until 1071. It was headed by a governor (katepano) with both civil and military powers. At its greatest extent, it comprised mainland Italy south of a line drawn from Monte Gargano to the Gulf of Salerno. North of that line, the Tyrrhenian duchies of Amalfi and Naples also maintained a volatile allegiance to Byzantine Emperors through the katepano. The Italian region of Capitanata derives its name from the term katepanikion (a province under the jurisdiction of katepano).

== History ==
Byzantine provinces (themes) in southern Italy, around 1000 (Calabria, Lucania, Langobardia)

Following the fall of the Exarchate of Ravenna in 751, the remaining jurisdictions of Byzantine Italy, from Byzantine Venetia in the north to the Theme of Sicily in the south, entered a period of decline that lasted until the accession of Basil I (reigned 867–886) to the throne of Constantinople. From 868 on, the imperial fleet and Byzantine diplomats were employed in an effort to secure the Adriatic Sea from Saracen raids, re-establish Byzantine dominance over Dalmatia, and extend Byzantine control once more over parts of Italy.

As a result of these efforts, Otranto was taken from the Saracens in 873, and Bari, captured from Arabs by the Holy Roman Emperor Louis II in 871, passed under Byzantine control in 876. The expeditions of the capable general Nikephoros Phokas the Elder in the mid-880s further extended Byzantine control over most of Apulia and Calabria. These victories were followed up by his successors and laid the foundation of a resurgence of Byzantine power in southern Italy, culminating in the establishment of the theme of Longobardia in c. 892. The regions of Apulia, Calabria and Basilicata would remain firmly under Byzantine control until the 11th century. In c. 965, a new theme of Lucania was established, and the stratēgos (military governor) of Bari was raised to the title of katepanō of Italy, usually with the rank of patrikios. The title of katepanō meant "the uppermost" in Greek. This elevation was deemed militarily necessary after the final loss of nearby Sicily, a previously Byzantine possession, to the Arabs.

Some Norman adventurers, on pilgrimage to Monte Sant'Angelo sul Gargano, lent their swords in 1017 to the Lombard cities of Apulia against the Byzantines. From 1016 to 1030 the Normans were pure mercenaries, serving either Byzantine or Lombard, and then Duke Sergius IV of Naples, by installing their leader Ranulf Drengot in the fortress of Aversa in 1030. This gave the Normans their first foothold in southern Italy from which they began an organized conquest of the land. In 1030, William and Drogo, the two eldest sons of Tancred of Hauteville, a noble of Coutances in Normandy arrived in southern Italy. The two joined in the organized attempt to wrest Apulia from the Byzantines, who had lost most of that province by 1040. Bari was captured by the Normans in April 1071, and Byzantine authority was finally terminated in Italy, five centuries after the conquests of Justinian I. In 1154-1156, through a plan hatched by Emperor Manuel I Komnenos, the Byzantines returned briefly to besiege Bari and were moderately successful in inciting a mass revolt which nearly toppled Norman control (potentially handing much of the former Katepanate back to the Byzantine Empire), but the gains were "reversed by misfortune".

The title Catapan of Apulia and Campania was revived briefly in 1166 for Gilbert, Count of Gravina, the cousin of the queen regent Margaret of Navarre. In 1167, with his authority as catapan, Gilbert forced German troops out of the Campania and compelled Frederick Barbarossa to raise the siege of Ancona.

== Catepans ==
Number	Katepano of Italy (Birth–Death)	Term start	Term end	Roman Emperor (Start of reign–End of reign)
1	Michael Abidelas	970	975	John I Tzimiskes (969–976)
2	Romanos (I)	before 982		Basil II (976–1025)
3	Kalokyros Delphinas (–989)	982	985	Basil II (976–1025)
4	Romanos (II)	985	988	Basil II (976–1025)
5	John Ammiropoulos	988	998	Basil II (976–1025)
6	Gregory Tarchaneiotes	999	1006	Basil II (976–1025)
7	Alexios Xiphias (–1008)	1006	1008	Basil II (976–1025)
8	John Kourkouas (–1010)	1008	1010	Basil II (976–1025)
9	Basil Mesardonites (–1016)	1010	1016	Basil II (976–1025)
10	Kontoleon Tornikios	May 1017	Dec. 1017	Basil II (976–1025)
11	Basil Boioannes	Dec. 1017	1027	Basil II (976–1025)
11	Basil Boioannes	Dec. 1017	1027	Constantine VIII (1025–1028)
12	Protospatharios Christophoros Burgaris	1027	1029	Constantine VIII (1025–1028)
12	Protospatharios Christophoros Burgaris	1027	1029	Romanos III Argyros (1028–1034)
13	Protospatharios Pothos Argyros (–1031)	1029	1031	Romanos III Argyros (1028–1034)
14	Protospatharios Michael	1031	1033	Romanos III Argyros (1028–1034)
15	Constantine Opos	1033	1038	Romanos III Argyros (1028–1034)
15	Constantine Opos	1033	1038	Michael IV (1034–1041)
15	Constantine Opos	1033	1038	Michael IV (1034–1041)
16	Michael Spondyles	1038	1039	Michael IV (1034–1041)
17	Nikephoros Dokeianos (–1040)	1039	1040	Michael IV (1034–1041)
18	Michael Dokeianos (–1050)	1040	1041	Michael IV (1034–1041)
19	Exaugustus Boioannes	1041	1042	Michael IV (1034–1041)
20	Synodianos	Feb. 1042	Apr. 1042	Michael V Kalaphates (1041–1042)
21	Magistros George Maniakes (c. 998–1043)	Apr. 1042	Sep. 1042	Zoe & Theodora Porphyrogenita (1042)
21	Magistros George Maniakes (c. 998–1043)	Apr. 1042	Sep. 1042	Constantine IX Monomachos (1042–1055)
22	Pardos	Sep. 1042		Constantine IX Monomachos (1042–1055)
23	Basil Theodorokanos	Feb. 1043	Spring 1043	Constantine IX Monomachos (1042–1055)
24	Eustathios Palatinos	Autumn 1045	1046	Constantine IX Monomachos (1042–1055)
25	John Raphael	Sep. 1046	Dec. 1046	Constantine IX Monomachos (1042–1055)
26	Argyrus	1050	1058	Constantine IX Monomachos (1042–1055)
26	Argyrus	1050	1058	Theodora Porphyrogenita (1055–1056)
26	Argyrus	1050	1058	Michael VI Bringas (1056–1057)
26	Argyrus	1050	1058	Isaac I Komnenos (1057–1059)
27	Marules	1060	1061	Constantine X Doukas (1059–1067)
28	Sirianus	1061	1062	Constantine X Doukas (1059–1067)
29	Abulchares	1062	1068	Constantine X Doukas (1059–1067)
29	Abulchares	1062	1068	Romanos IV Diogenes (1067–1071)
30	Leo Perenos	1068	1071	Romanos IV Diogenes (1067–1071)
31	Stephen Pateranos	1071		Romanos IV Diogenes (1067–1071)
32*	Nobelissimos Robert Guiscard (c. 1015–1085)	1074	1078	Michael VII Doukas (1071–1078)

== See also ==
- Magna Graecia
- Grecìa Salentina
- Katepanikion
- Catepanate of Ras

== Sources ==
- Charanis, Peter. "On the Question of the Hellenization of Sicily and Southern Italy During the Middle Ages." The American Historical Review. Vol. 52, No. 1 (Oct., 1946), pp. 74–86.
- Cosentino, Salvatore, ed. (2021). A Companion to Byzantine Italy. Boston-Leiden: Brill. ISBN 978-90-04-30770-4.
- Guillou, André (1965). "La Lucanie byzantine: Étude de géographie historique" (PDF). Byzantion (in French). 35: 119–149. Archived from the original (PDF) on 16 June 2025.
- Kreutz, Barbara M. (1996). Before the Normans: Southern Italy in the Ninth and Tenth Centuries. Philadelphia: University of Pennsylvania Press. ISBN 978-0-8122-0543-5.
- Loud, Graham A. (1999). "Southern Italy in the tenth century". New Cambridge Medieval History. Vol. 3. Cambridge: Cambridge University Press. pp. 624–645. ISBN 978-0-521-36447-8.
- Loud, Graham (2013). The Age of Robert Guiscard: Southern Italy and the Northern Conquest. New York: Routledge. ISBN 978-0-582-04529-3.
- Peters, Edward; Foulke, William D., eds. (2003) [1907]. Paul the Deacon: History of the Lombards. Philadelphia: University of Pennsylvania Press. ISBN 0-8122-1079-4.
- White, Lynn, Jr.. "The Byzantinization of Sicily." The American Historical Review. Vol. 42, No. 1 (Oct., 1936), pp. 1–21.
- Wickham, Chris (1981). Early Medieval Italy: Central Power and Local Society, 400-1000. Totowa, NJ: Barnes & Noble. ISBN 978-0-389-20217-2.
