= Constantine Opos (catepan) =

Constantine Leo Opos (Italian: Costantino Opo) was the Byzantine catapan of Italy from 1033 to 1038. He replaced Michael Protospatharios. The record of a strategos named Leo Opos, sent to Italy at about the same time, is probably of the same person. The chief sources of his reign are Lupus Protospatharios Barensis and the Anonymi Barensis Chronicon. Constantine gave a diploma to a monastery near Troia in November 1034. In 1037, the Zirid sultan of Tunisia, Sharaf ad-Dawla al-Mu'izz ibn Badis, sent his son Abdallah to fight the Sicilian emir Ahmad II al-Akhal. Al-Akhal was defeated and fled to Constantine. The next year Constantine disappears from the record to be replaced by Michael Spondyles and then Nikephoros Doukeianos.

== Sources ==
- Gay, Jules (1904). L'Italie méridionale et l'empire Byzantin: Livre II. New York: Burt Franklin..

Preceded by Michael Protospatharios	Catepan of Italy; 1033–1038	Succeeded by Michael Spondyles
