= Maraclea =

- Tartus District, Syria
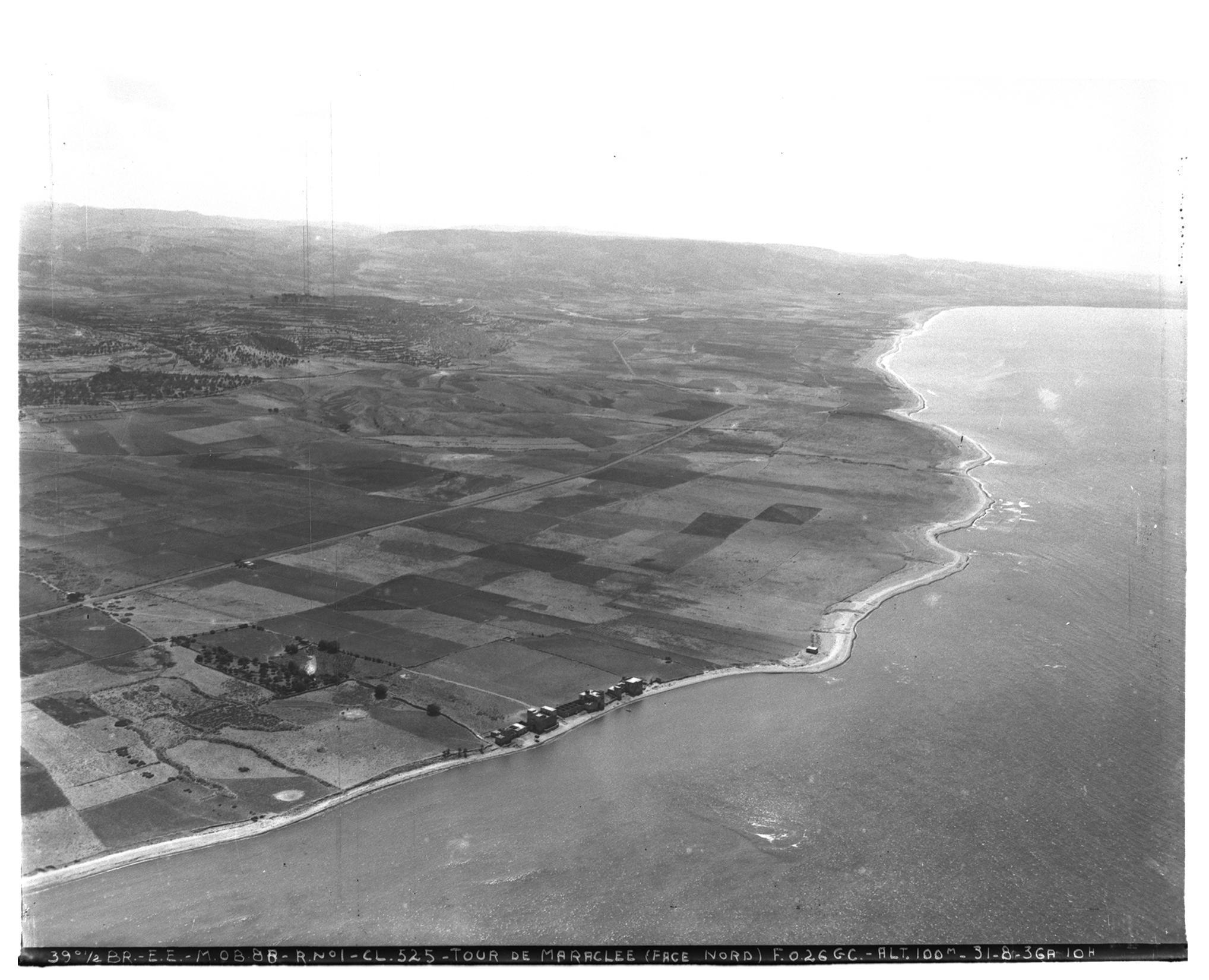
- 1936 aerial view of Maraclea

Site information
- Type: Castle
- Open to the public: Yes
- Condition: Ruined

Location
- Coordinates: 35°4′4″N 35°53′26″E

Maraclea was a small coastal Crusader town and a castle in the Levant, between Tortosa and Baniyas (Buluniyas). The modern-day location is known as Kharab Maraqiya (Arabic: خراب مرقية).

== History ==
Following the Muslim conquest of the Levant, Caliph Mu'awiya I repopulated and garrisoned the coastal cities including Maraclea. In 675/676, a Byzantine fleet assaulted Maraclea, killing the governor of Homs.

In 968, Byzantine Emperor Nikephoros II Phokas ravaged the region including Maraclea. In 1030, Niketas of Mistheia, doux of Antioch, managed to force a coalition of Arab tribes led by Nasr ibn Musharraf al-Rawadifi, the qadi of Tripoli and the local Fatimid commander to withdraw from besieging Maraclea.

During the middle of the 13th century, the possession of the castle was a matter of dispute between the Principality of Antioch and the Hospitallers. In 1271, the city of Maraclea was destroyed by the Mamluks. Its Lord, one of the vassals of Bohemond VI, named Barthélémy de Maraclée, is recorded as having fled from the Mamluk offensive, taking refuge in Persia at the Mongol Court of Abagha, where he exhorted the Mongols to intervene in the Holy Land.

In 1285, Qalawun blackmailed Bohemond VII into destroying the last fortifications of the area, where Barthélémy was entrenched, a square tower which had been erected some distance from the shore. Qalawun said he would besiege Tripoli if the Maraclea fort was not dismantled.

== See also ==
- List of Crusader castles
- List of castles in Syria

== Sources ==
- Fattori, Niccolò (June 2013). "The Policies of Nikephoros II Phokas in the context of the Byzantine economic recovery" (PDF). Middle East Technical University.
- Grousset, René (1935). L'épopée des Croisades (in French). Perrin. ISBN 2-262-01864-2.
- Jandora, John W. (1986). "Developments in Islamic Warfare: The Early Conquests". Studia Islamica (64): 101–113. doi:10.2307/1596048. JSTOR 1596048.
- Jankowiak, Marek (2013). "The First Arab Siege of Constantinople". In Zuckerman, Constantin (ed.). Travaux et mémoires, Vol. 17: Constructing the Seventh Century. Paris: Association des Amis du Centre d’Histoire et Civilisation de Byzance. pp. 237–320.
- Runciman, Steven (1987). A history of the Crusades 3. Penguin Books. ISBN 978-0-14-013705-7.
