= Mahalibeh Castle =

Coordinates: 35°30′29″N 36°5′14″E

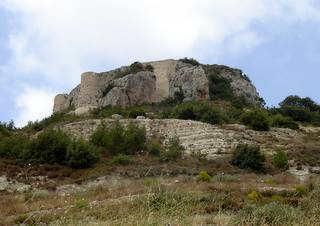
View of Mahalibeh Castle

Mahalibeh Castle (Arabic: قلعة المهالبة), formerly known as Balatanos or Balatunus (name derived from the Latin Platanus), is located on a high mountain summit near Lattakia, 40 km inland of the Syrian coast. The Mahalibeh Castle is also an inhabited place, administratively part of the Jawbat Burghal subdistrict of the Qardaha District of Latakia Governorate. According to the Syria Central Bureau of Statistics, it had a population of 772 in the 2004 census.

== History ==
The castle was built in the 11th century by the princely Banu'l-Ahmar family. In 1031, the tribe surrendered it to Niketas of Mistheia of the Byzantine Empire. In 1118, it was occupied by the Crusaders, led by Roger of Salerno. The castle suffered many clashes and damages, and finally surrendered to Saladin in 1188, namely to his son al-Zahir Ghazi, in 1194. In 1269, it was restored by the Mamluk sultan Baybars. In 1280, it was under the control of the Mamluk rebel emir Sunqur al-Ashqar, before being retaken by Sultan Qalawun in 1285. In 1408, a strong earthquake considerably damaged the castle, and it was abandoned.

Under Ottoman rule, at least during the early 17th century, the castle was used by the authorities to store grain and rice belonging to the state. By the early 18th century, the castle had become identified with the Muhalaba or (Mahalibeh), an Alawite tribal grouping predominant in the area, which also became referred to as the Muhalaba in Ottoman government records.

The castle is substantially damaged but was being restored as of 2018. The outer walls surround the bulk massive of the castle. There are cisterns, underground rooms, and remnants of premises in the middle, plus some arches and towers are visible. The only attaching section to the surrounding land is through a southern piece of connecting lane, where the road goes. The castle is accessed through a paved road via Qardaha from the west and Jawbat Burghal from the east.

== See also ==
- List of castles in Syria

== Bibliography ==
- Theotokis, Georgios; Meško, Marek (2020). War in Eleventh-Century Byzantium. Routledge. ISBN 9780429576881.
- Winter, Stefan (2016). A History of the 'Alawis: From Medieval Aleppo to the Turkish Republic. Princeton and Oxford: Princeton University Press. ISBN 9780691167787.
