= Uggiano la Chiesa =

- Comune
- Comune di Uggiano la Chiesa
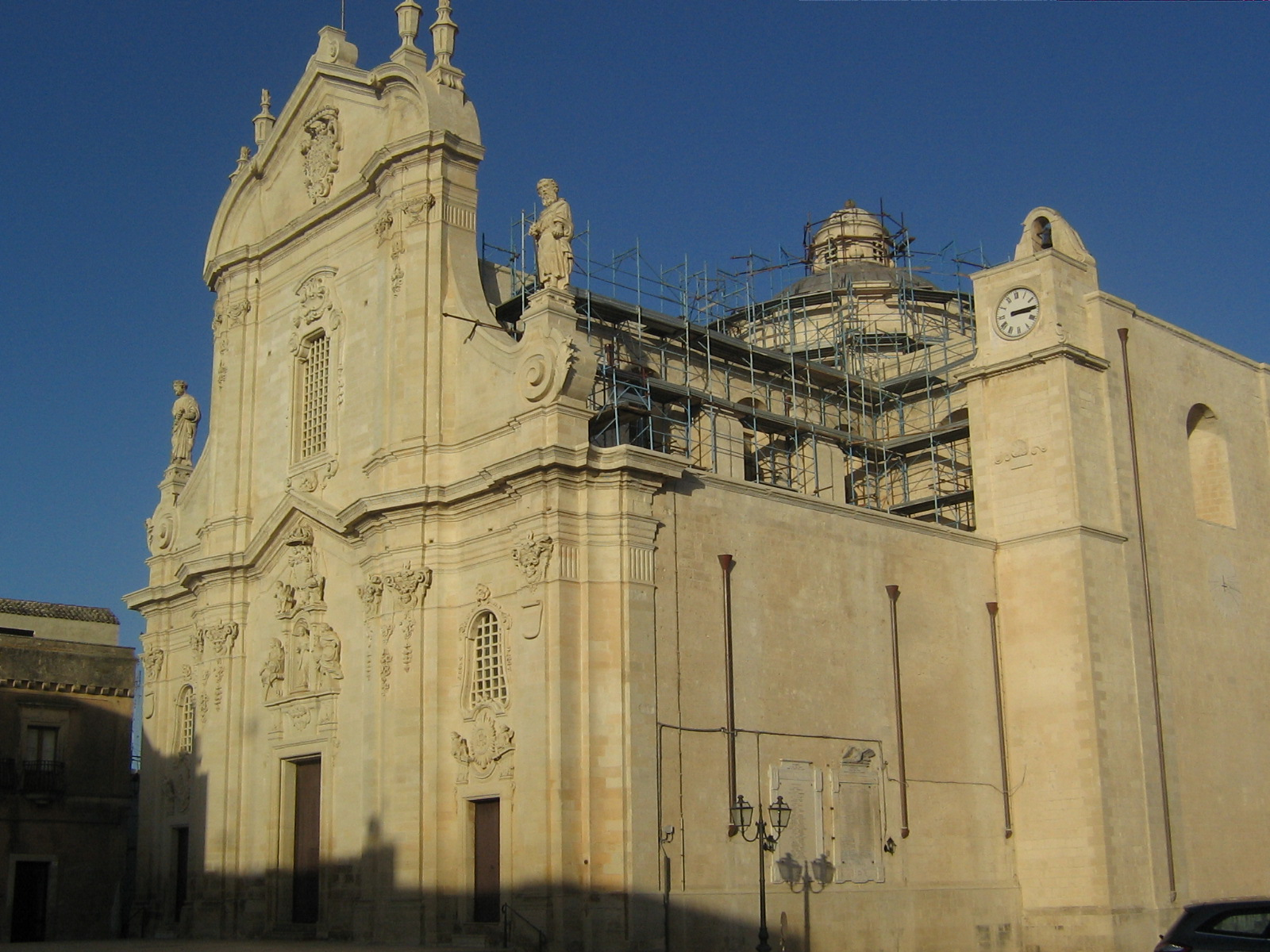
- Mother Church of Uggiano

- Coat of arms

- Location within Italy Location within Apulia
- Coordinates: 40°06′N 18°27′E
- Country: Italy
- Region: Apulia
- Province: Lecce (LE)
- Frazioni: Casamassella

Government
  - Mayor: Giuseppe Salvatore Piconese

Area
  - Total: 14 km^{2} (5.4 sq mi)
- Elevation: 77 m (253 ft)

Population (30 September 2017)
  - Total: 4,488
  - Density: 320/km^{2} (830/sq mi)
- Demonym: Uggianesi
- Time zone: UTC+1 (CET)
  - Summer (DST): UTC+2 (CEST)
- Postal code: 73020
- Dialing code: 0836
- Patron saint: St. Mary Magdelene
- Saint day: July 22
- Website: Official website

Uggiano la Chiesa (Salentino: Uššànu) is a town and comune in the province of Lecce in the Apulia region of south-east Italy.

== Main sights ==
- Mother Church, finished in 1775.
- Tower of the Angel
- Crypt of St. Helena, a Byzantine church with remains of the original frescoes.
- Crypt of Archangel Michael, dating to the 13th-14th centuries.

About 4 kilometres (2.5 mi) outside the town is the menhir of San Giovanni Malcantone, standing at more than 4 metres (13 ft).

== Twin towns ==
- Atrani, Italy, since July 2006
