= Bani Qahtan Castle =

Historical castle in Syria

- Latakia Governorate, Syria

Site information
- Type: Castle

Location
- Coordinates: 35°35′N 36°04′E

Bani Qahtan castle (Arabic: قلعة بني قحطان) is found in the Syrian Coastal Mountains, about 40 km from Latakia city.

The Bani Qahtan Castle also refers to the small village surrounding the castle. It is administratively part of the Ayn al-Sharqiyah subdistrict of the Jableh District of Latakia Governorate. According to the Syria Central Bureau of Statistics, it had a population of 347 in the 2004 census.

== History ==
The castle which was known as Bikisrail, was controlled by Byzantine doux of Antioch, Niketas of Mistheia, in 1032. It was later captured by Crusaders led by Tancred in 1111. The castle was later mentioned as being a stronghold in the hands of Nizari Ismaili in 1131, who surrendered it to Saladin in 1188.

== Structure ==
The castle is totally damaged and not much remained from it, as its ruins are dated back to the 12th century. It is reached by car road through Baniyas-Jableh road from west. External walls are well preserved, which contain the whole massive of the castle. The castle is situated on a high mountain, accessible only from the south through a narrow piece of land.

== See also ==
- List of castles in Syria

== Bibliography ==
- France, John (2002), Western Warfare in the Age of the Crusades 1000-1300, Routledge, ISBN 9781135365066
- Theotokis, Georgios; Meško, Marek (2020). War in Eleventh-Century Byzantium. Routledge. ISBN 9780429576881.
