= List of taxes =

This page, a companion page to tax, lists different taxes by economic design. For different taxes by country, see Tax rates around the world.

Taxes generally fall into the following broad categories:

- Income tax
- Payroll tax
- Property tax
- Consumption tax
- Tariff (taxes on international trade)
- Capitation, a fixed tax charged per person
- Fees and tolls
- Effective taxes, government policies that are not explicitly taxes, but result in income to the government through losses to the public

== Income tax ==
- Capital gains tax is a tax on the sale of an investment, usually stocks, bonds, precious metals and property.
- Corporate tax is levied on the earnings or profits of a corporation.
- Dividend tax is a tax on dividends paid to shareholders of a company.
- Excess profits tax is a tax on unusually high profits levied on a corporation. This was largely levied in the United States in times of war to prevent war profiteering, but has been proposed at other times.
- Flat tax, an income tax where everyone pays the same tax rate.
- Gift tax, a tax on gifts given (generally paid by the person making the gift, not by the recipient).
- Gross receipts tax, a tax on revenues received by a corporation, even if they don't profit.
- Hall–Rabushka flat tax, a flat tax on income that excludes investments.
- Inheritance tax, a tax paid on money gained through inheritance
- Negative income tax, an income tax where the poor receive payment from the government, instead of owing taxes.
- Windfall profits tax is a tax on profits gained by a company that has some kind of large unexpected profit.

== Payroll tax ==
- FICA tax is a tax levied in the United States to fund Social Security and Medicare.
- Pay-as-you-earn tax is a tax paid on each paycheck to pay towards income tax. It is commonly refunded when taxpayers file income tax returns.
- Withholding tax is money withheld from a paycheck, often to contribute to income tax liability.

== Property taxes ==
Most property taxes charge for both the value of the land and the value of any buildings or other improvements on the land.

- Carucage was a tax on land levied in medieval England. The tax was only collected when the government required extra revenue and was never levied regularly.
- Council Tax is a tax in the United Kingdom on houses.
- Danegeld was a tax paid to the Vikings to ensure the Vikings would not raid a person's land.
- Kharaj is an Islamic tax on agricultural land.
- Land value tax is a tax on the value of land that does not tax the value of the improvements on the land.
- Tallage, a tax on land levied in medieval Europe.
- Window tax was a tax levied in England based on the number of windows on a building.

== Consumption taxes ==
A general tax refers to a tax that applies to all or most goods and services and where all are taxed at the same rate. An excise tax refers to a tax on a single item, which may be different from the tax levied on other items.

=== General taxes ===
- Sales tax is a tax on retail sales.
- Value added tax is a tax on manufacturing that taxes the difference between the cost of raw materials and the cost of the final product.
- FairTax is a proposal to replace every tax in a particular country with a single retail sales tax. To avoid having the tax being regressive, the tax system would also provide a rebate to every citizen subject to the tax.
- Per unit tax, a tax charged proportionally to the amount sold, such as by cents per kilogram.
- Turnover tax, a tax on intermediate and capital goods that is viewed as a precursor to a value-added tax.
- Use tax, a tax charged on an item purchased in an area without a sales tax when brought to areas that has one.

=== Excise taxes ===
==== Current ====
- Alcohol tax is a tax that levies alcohol.
- Carbon tax is a tax levied on the carbon content of fuels, as a measure to combat climate change.
- Fat tax is a tax levied on unhealthy foods.
- Financial transaction tax is a tax on certain financial transactions, such as the sale of stocks.
- Fuel excise is a tax levied on fuels, especially for motor vehicles.
- Internet tax is a tax on internet services.
- Luxury tax is a tax on luxury goods.
- Soda tax is a tax on soda.
- Sin tax is a tax levied against any undesired activity. This includes taxes on alcohol and cigarettes.
- Stamp Duty is a tax levied on official documents.
- Transfer tax is a tax levied on the sale of property.
- Vehicle excise duty is a tax on vehicles levied in the United Kingdom.'

==== Historical ====
- Adet-i ağnam was an annual tax on sheep and goats levied by the Ottoman Empire. Unlike most Ottoman taxes, this tax went to the national treasury, rather than regional treasuries. It was largely collected through tax farming.
- Resm-i arusane, known as the bride tax, was a tax on marriage levied by the Ottoman Empire.
- Rav akçesi, a tax levied on rabbis by the Ottoman Empire
- Salt tax is a tax on salt. Salt taxes have been the least popular taxes in history. Salt taxes in France, India and Russia were significant contributors to revolutions or uprisings in those countries.

==== Proposed ====
- Automated Payment Transaction tax is a proposed single tax system where all tax revenue would be collected by a small percentage of all transactions.
- Bank taxes, propose to improve financial stability.
- Currency transaction tax is a tax on currency conversions.
  - Spahn tax is a proposed currency transaction tax that attempts to tax speculators while not taxing more necessary currency conversions.
  - Tobin tax is a proposed tax on spot conversions between currencies.
- Robin Hood tax is a campaign to enact a package of financial transaction taxes.
- Natural resources consumption tax is a proposed tax on natural resources, including in ungoverned areas such as oceans.

== Tariffs ==
- A tariff is a tax levied on items crossing an international border.
- Tribute is a payment made from a less powerful country to a more powerful country as a sign of allegiance.

== Capitation ==
- Poll tax, also called a head tax, is a fixed tax that must be paid by each person.
- Fiscus Judaicus, was a tax that Jews were required to pay in the Roman Empire
- Jizya is a tax paid by non-Muslims in a Muslim state. Compare to Zakat.
- Leibzoll was tax that Jews were required to pay in medieval Europe.
- Temple tax was a Roman tax used to pay for temples.
- Tithe is a payment to a church or similar authority. While voluntary in modern times, historically these payments have been mandatory.
- Tolerance tax was a tax levied in Austria-Hungary against Jews.
- Zakat is a tax paid by Muslims in a Muslim state. Compare to Jizya.

=== Taxes promoting marriage and reproduction ===
A number of taxes have targeted the promotion of marriage and childbearing. They include:

- Aes uxorium, an ancient Roman tax on unmarried people
- Bachelor tax, a general term for punitive taxes on unmarried men
- Ehestandshilfe, a Nazi-era tax on unmarried people
- Tax on childlessness, Eastern Bloc taxes on childless people
- Resm-i mücerred, a bachelor tax in the Ottoman Empire

== Fees and tolls ==
- Development Impact Tax is a fee charged to a developer to pay for the amount of infrastructure that will need to be built to accommodate the new residents or customers of the development. Such fees fund municipal government services such as roads, domestic water services and schools.
- Fares are payments required to use public transportation.
- Toll, a fee required to use government infrastructure, usually a road, including bridges and tunnels.
- Tuition is a charge collected for attending schools and colleges. Many countries charge tuition for attending government run schools, making this a form of tax.

== Effective taxes ==
- Inflation tax is the value lost by inflation, by holders of cash and those on fixed incomes. Inflation causes those holding cash to lose money by reducing its real value, but at the same time, reduces the amount owed by debtors because the real value of the debt has decreased.
- Seigniorage is the difference between the value of money and the actual cost required to produce it. Mints make a profit from this difference in value, so it is frequently viewed as a tax.

== Other taxes ==
- Corvée refers to a person being forced to work instead of paying taxes. Such systems require certain classes of people to labor for a certain length of time, and the person would be free once the corvee obligations were met. While a form of unfree labor, it is also considered a tax, since a person's labor has value. Corvee was often implemented in areas where the poor had no money to pay as taxes.
- Church tax is any tax that goes to a church.
- Ecotax, a tax of any kind intended to improve the environment.
- Franchise tax is a tax levied on the net worth of a corporation.
- Khums was a tax on items looted during war levied in Islamic States.
- Scutage was a medieval English tax levied on holders of a knight's fee under the feudal land tenure of knight-service.
- Surtax is an additional tax levied on some other tax.
- Wealth tax is a tax on the value of everything owned by a person.

== Taxation practices ==
- Ad valorem tax is any tax that is based on the actual value of the item being taxed. Nearly any type of tax can be an ad valorem tax.
- Direct tax is a tax paid by a person, as opposed to a tax levied on a business that the person indirectly pays.
- Double taxation is when a tax is paid twice on the same income or item.
- Indirect tax is a tax collected by an intermediary (such as a store) on behalf of the person who actually is required to pay (such as a customer)
- Lump-sum tax is a tax that is a set amount, regardless of a person's wealth or an item's value.
- Pigovian tax is a tax on a good or service that causes a harm to society that is not paid by the users of that good or service. It is designed to pay for the negative externalities of the good.
- Payment in lieu of taxes is a system where an entity that is exempt from taxation makes a payment to the government instead. This payment may be mandatory or voluntary. Usually it applies to property.
- Proportional tax is any tax where the tax rate is the same for all payers.
- Progressive tax is a tax that charges the rich a greater percentage of their income than the poor.
- Regressive tax is a tax that charges the poor a greater percentage of their income than the rich.
- Single tax is a tax system that has only one tax levied.
- Steering tax is a tax that aims to change the behavior of the public.
- Tax break is a policy where certain groups are exempt from taxes or can be lower taxes.
- Tax Farming is where a government grants persons the right to collect taxes and turn them over to the government.
- Tax holiday is a policy where certain taxes are not collected for a period of time.
- Tax-free shopping is a policy where visitors to a country can get their sales taxes or other taxes refunded.

== Non-compliance ==
- Tax avoidance, legal techniques to avoid paying taxes
- Tax evasion, illegal techniques designed to avoid paying taxes
- Tax protester, a person who refuses to pay a tax they believe to be wrong or illegal
- Tax resistance, refusal to pay taxes as a protest measure
- Tax haven, a country whose banking or tax laws allows companies to avoid paying taxes in other countries

== See also ==
- Energy law
- Ghetto tax, a term for when poor people are forced to pay more for services. This is not actually a tax.
- Luxury tax (sports), a fee on sports teams with player salaries exceeding a set maximum. This is charged by the sports league and is not actually a tax.
- Optimal tax, the study of developing the best tax system
- Taxation as theft, the belief that all taxes are immoral
- Tax incidence, the effect a tax has on the economy and social welfare.
