= Bachelor tax =

Punitive tax imposed on unmarried men

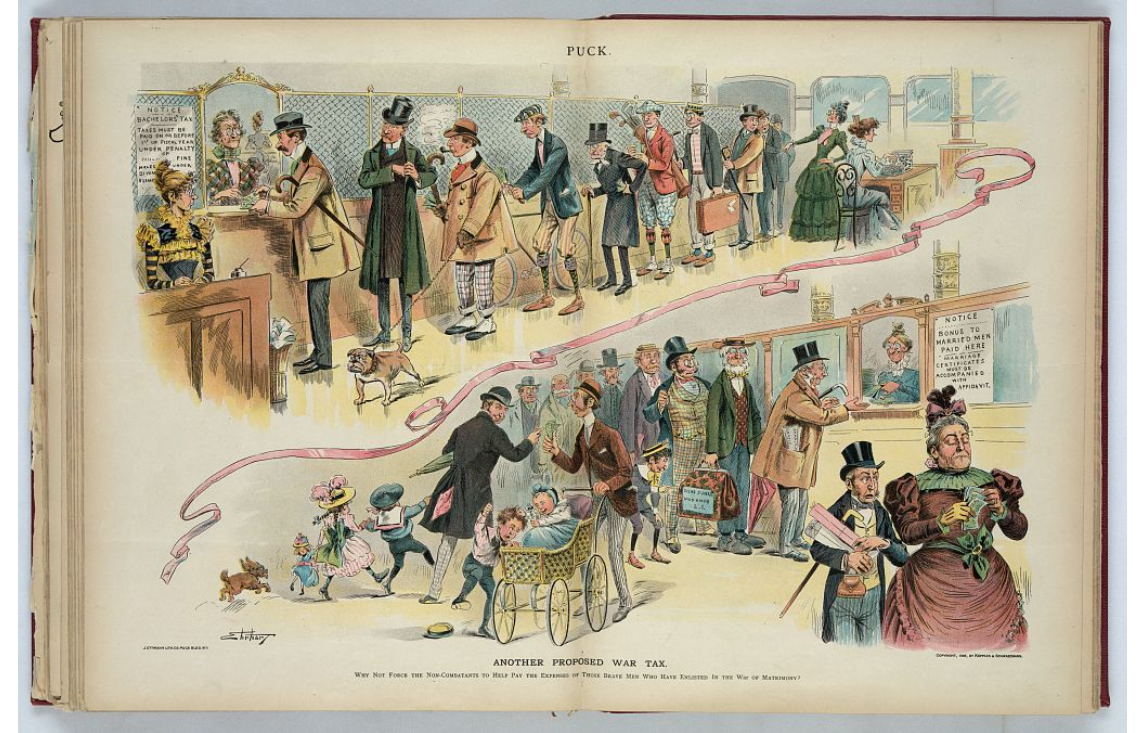
Late 19th-century illustration and perspective on the bachelor tax from Puck magazine (vol. 43, n. 1114, 13 July 1898)

A bachelor tax is a punitive tax imposed on unmarried men (bachelors) and/or unmarried women (bachelorettes). In the modern era, many countries do vary tax rates by marital status, so current references to bachelor taxes are typically implicit rather than explicit; and given the state of tax law is very complicated, as tax accountancy concepts like income splitting can come into play.

Such explicit measures historically would be instituted as part of a moral panic or homophobia due to the important status given to marriage at various times and places, as in the Roman Empire under Augustus' moral legislation or in various U.S. state legislatures in the 19th and early 20th centuries. Frequently, this would be attached to racial policies (e.g., as part of the Apartheid legislation) and/or nationalistic reasons (as in Fascist Italy or Nazi Germany).

More recently, bachelor taxes were viewed as related to tax on childlessness, which were used frequently in the Eastern Bloc by communist member states of the Warsaw Pact during the Cold War (1945–1990).

== Timeline ==
Location	Date(s)	Passed	Comment
Roman Empire	9 AD	Yes	Main article: Lex Papia Poppaea § Promotion of Marriage See also: Aes uxorium The Lex Papia Poppaea was introduced by Roman Emperor Augustus to encourage marriages and increase the birth rate among Roman citizens. In particular, penalties were imposed on those who were celibate, with an exception granted to Vestal Virgins (Ulp. Frag. xvii.1). The law also imposed penalties on married persons who had no children (qui liberos non habent, Gaius, ii.111) from the age of twenty-five to sixty in a man, and from the age of twenty to fifty in a woman. (Tacit. Ann. xv.19).
Nevers, Kingdom of France	1223	Yes	Charged a yearly tithe of five solidi to any bachelor living in Nevers, Burgundy as part of a moral panic.
Ottoman Empire	15th century	Yes	Main article: Resm-i mücerred Resm-i mücerred was a bachelor tax instituted in the Ottoman Empire in conjunction with the resm-i çift (land-owning Muslims) and the resm-i bennâk (landless peasants). Those who fell under the tax were more likely to migrate to other areas. Migrant mücerred were more likely to make their way to a growing town.
Kingdom of England	1695	Yes	Main article: Marriage Duty Act 1695 The English Parliament passed the Marriage Duty Act 1695, also known as the Registration Tax, which imposed a tax on births, marriages, burials, childless widowers, and bachelors over the age of 25. It was primarily used as a revenue raising mechanism for war on France and as a means of ensuring that proper records were kept by the Anglican Church's officials. The tax was found ineffective and abolished by 1706.
Kingdom of England	1798	Yes	Although not officially targeting unmarried men, an income tax was passed particularly discriminating against bachelors.
United States, Missouri	1821	Yes	The state legislature of Missouri applied a US$1 tax on all unmarried men. By the following year, it was replaced by a poll tax.
United States, New York	1825	No	A bill was proposed by the state legislature of New York comparing bachelors with dogs, aiming to replace the then current tax on dogs with one on bachelors instead.
United States, Connecticut	1857	No	The General Assembly of Connecticut repealed a motion to implement a bachelor tax in the state, under the argument that different methods of taxation already taxed bachelors more heavily.
United States, Michigan	1837, 1848, 1849, 1850, 1897, 1901, 1911, 1919, 1935	No	The state legislature of Michigan had made repeated attempts to introduce a bachelor tax. In 1837, state senator Edward D. Ellis attempted to pass such a bill, but the measure failed. In 1848, a petition made it to a House committee, but did not reach the floor. In 1849, another proposal was made in a House committee that did not reach the floor. Again in 1850, another petition reached the House, but did not find a sponsor. During the Civil War it was proposed again, this time as a revenue measure as opposed to a public welfare measure, but again failed to reach the floor. It was then repeatedly brought up in 1897, 1901, 1911, and 1919, with the first resulting in counter proposals for a similar tax to be applied to women who reject marriage proposals and the final resulting in arguments that bachelors had a statistically higher rate of delinquency as opposed to other groups. The final proposed bill that also made the floor of the Michigan Congress was in 1935 before it too failed due to economic considerations of the time.
United States, Wyoming	1890	No	The state legislature of Wyoming briefly considered a $2.50 bachelor tax in 1890, but the motion was tabled.
United States, New Jersey	1898	No	One assemblyman of the state legislature of New Jersey proposed a bachelor tax as a sumptuary tax; however, the bill was not passed.
United States, Delaware	1907	No	Started as a joke before generating much discussion and ultimately being defeated.
United States, Georgia	1911	No	One assemblyman of the General Assembly of Georgia proposed a US$50 yearly tax on bachelors, suggesting that the funds should finance the local school system.
United States, Minnesota	1911	No	The state legislature of Minnesota proposed a $5 yearly levy on bachelors.
Republican France	1913	No	Proposed not only a large tax on bachelors, but also "spinsters".
Reichenburg, Switzerland	1915	Yes	Imposed a bachelor tax on unmarried men living in Reichenburg as part of a progressive taxation measure.
Union of South Africa	1919	Yes	Imposed a bachelor tax upon White South Africans for racial reasons, in order to match their population growth with that of other ethnic groups.
United States, Wisconsin	1921	No	Generated frequent moral debate at the time.
United States, Montana	1921	Yes	The state legislature of Montana applied a $3 tax on all bachelors in the state. One of them, William Atzinger, refused to pay on sex discrimination grounds. On January 11, 1922, the state supreme court struck down the "bachelor tax" and another poll tax applicable only to men. However, it was done on the grounds that the Montanan constitution of 1889 did not grant the legislature the power to tax individual persons; and attempts to define it as a policing measure for matters of public health as opposed to a revenue measure were found invalid (and the decision did not reference Atzinger's arguments against the tax on grounds of sex discrimination).
Weimar Germany	1923	Yes	The town of Repelen in Weimar Germany passed a bachelor tax of 2000 Reichmarks per month. However, this law was quickly overturned by federal authorities.
Kingdom of Italy	1927	Yes	Levied in Fascist Italy from 1927 until the fall of Mussolini in 1943, the Italian bachelor tax targeted unmarried men as part of a race-based pronatalist policy. By 1936, Italian bachelors paid nearly double their normal income tax rate.
Kingdom of Spain	1928	Yes	Law passed following in the footsteps of Fascist Italy, the Restored Kingdom of Spain also passed a bachelor tax, only with very few exceptions, such as Roman Catholic priests.
Nazi Germany	1934	Yes	Main article: Ehestandshilfe Law passed following in the footsteps of Fascist Italy and Restored Spain, but mainly based on Nazi "family values". In particular, it was meant as part of Hitler's "three Ks" (Kirche, Küche, Kinder: "Church, Kitchen, Children") national-conservative pronatalist policy to get German women "back into the home".
United States, California	1934	No	As a response to the low 1933 birth rate in California, Director of Finance Rolland Vandegrift proposed a US$5 to US$25 bachelor tax, but the measure did not succeed due to economic considerations of the time.
Finland	1935	Yes	Main article: fi:Vanhanpojan ja vanhanpiian vero Increased tax burden for unmarried, childless citizens over the age of 24 from 1935 to 1975.
Republican France	1939	No	Meant as a proposal to match similar proposals in Fascist Italy and Nazi Germany, but was rejected.
Argentine Republic	1939	No	Argentine senator Alfredo Palacios proposed a law that would create a special fund that would give benefits to government employees for each child under 16 that they had. The same law also prescribed that said employees would be prioritized for promotions at work. To finance this fund, all unmarried people and childless couples that worked for the government would have to give up a day's worth of their salary every three months that would be transferred to the fund.
Soviet Union	1941	Yes	A tax on childlessness was enforced in the Soviet Union from 1941 to 1992; it was applied to childless men from 25 to 50 years of age and to childless women from 20 to 45 years of age. The tax was income based, taking 6% of the childless person's wages.
Bulgaria	1925, 1943, 1968	Yes	Measures to try to introduce a bachelor tax in the Kingdom of Bulgaria first began in 1917, where it often took on a pro-eugenic character and part of discussion amongst Bulgarian Fascist party officials. It was formally proposed by 1925, only formally introduced in 1943, but passed in 1968 under the communist regime in Bulgaria only after applying the tax to both sexes, a move inspired by the Soviet model of family planning policies.
Republic of Poland	1946	Yes	The Soviet-backed Provisional Government of National Unity introduced the bykowe, which was a tax on childlessness that included a tax on those unmarried above 21 years from January 1, 1946 to November 29, 1956. It was later extended to those over 25 years of age until January 1, 1973 when it was repealed as a result of the Polish civil resistance against the communist regime.
Republic of Turkey	1949	Yes	Suggested and passed as a wealth transfer from Turkish bachelors to families.
Socialist Republic of Romania	1986	Yes	Some time after the population increase from the Decreţei 770 generation, a celibacy tax was instituted. The law continued to be enforced until the Romanian Revolution of 1989, when it was abolished by the transitional Romanian government.
Vastogirardi, Italian Republic	1999	No	The mayor of Vastogirardi, Molise, proposed to reinstitute a bachelor tax locally. However, this law was quickly overturned by regional authorities.

== Rationale ==
=== Moral panic and homophobia ===
During the 19th century in the United States, calls for a bachelor tax were frequently driven by a moral panic, and the bachelor tax was viewed as a way to reform social ills, either because individuals believed that bachelors had a higher rate of delinquency or because they believed that many bachelors were closeted homosexual men.

=== Social and scientific racism ===
The bachelor tax has a long history of being used for race-based pronatalist policies. In the early 20th century, this morphed into a general discussion of "race suicide", and consequently there was much literature supporting race-based pronatalist policies, typically in the field of eugenics. As an example, the Union of South Africa imposed a bachelor tax upon White South Africans for racial reasons, in order to match their population growth with that of other ethnic groups. After the rise of Fascism in the Kingdom of Italy, the Italian Fascist dictator Benito Mussolini explicitly called for the increase of Italian progeny in comparison to other Western European ethnicities in a speech that he delivered on May 26, 1927:

Let us be quite clear: what are 40 million Italians compared to 90 million Germans and 200 million Slavs? What are 40 million Italians compared to 40 million Frenchmen, plus 90 million inhabitants of their colonies, or 46 million Englishmen plus 450 million people who live in their colonies?

Thereafter, the idea of the bachelor tax was passed over to Fascist Italy, Francoist Spain, and Nazi Germany, discussed in Bulgarian Fascist circles, and became a staple of far-right propaganda in general.

=== Communist family planning ===
Some communist member states of the Warsaw Pact instituted similar forms of a bachelor tax, such as the Soviet Union, Bulgaria, Poland, and Romania. Typically, it formed a part of socialism-based pronatalist policies, taxes on childlessness, and Soviet-based family planning policies that were instituted in communist countries at around the same time in order to increase falling fertility rates.

=== Present day ===
Today, bachelor taxes have for the most part been superseded by the inclusion of marital status in the tax code. The first distinction in marital status as part of an income tax happened in the U.S. by 1930 after Poe v. Seaborn, where "income-splitting" was allowed in community property states. Therefore, until 1948, tax rates amongst married and bachelors differed based on one's state of residence. This disparity lead to joint-filing status being allowed by U.S. Federal tax law in 1948 to attempt to harmonize the tax code between community property and common law states. In the aftermath of World War II, joint filing and marital status began to be incorporated instead of explicit bachelor taxes into the U.S. tax system and soon spread to other tax systems around the world.

== Effects ==
According to a 2010 study in the Journal of the Society for the Anthropology of Europe, the utility of the tax has been mixed, as analysis of past historical episodes have questioned the reliability of the tax to results in pronatalist outcomes. In Fascist Italy, it was found to be ineffective, as birth and marriage rates actually decreased. In the Soviet Union, the effect on the fertility rate of the policy was likewise inconclusive; and it was also found to be fairly regressive, as it tended to hit rural, poorer bachelors hardest. However, modern day implementations of taxation based on marital status in the U.S. has found a positive correlation with marriage rate.

== See also ==
- Aes uxorium
- Antinatalism and natalism
- Birth dearth
- Community property
- Demographic transition
- "He never married"
- Human extinction
- Human overpopulation
- Human population projections
- List of countries by maternal mortality ratio
- Marriage penalty
- Marriage promotion
- Only child
- Population ageing
- Population control
- Population decline
- Reproductive rights
- Sub-replacement fertility
- Sustainable population
- Total fertility rate
- Zero population growth
