= Birth dearth =

Neologism referring to falling fertility rates

Birth dearth is a neologism coined by Ben J. Wattenberg in his 1987 book of the same name, which refers to the declining fertility rates observed in many modern industrialized, affluent societies. It is often cited as a response to overpopulation. Countries and geographic regions that are currently experiencing the highest rates of declining populations include Western Europe, Japan, the Russian Federation, and South Korea. Populations in other industrialized countries, such as the United Kingdom and the United States, and developing, poorer regions of the world, including the Balkans, Central Asia, the Middle East, and Sub-Saharan Africa, are also being impacted.

== Russia ==
The Russian Federation is often mentioned in articles concerning birth dearth because of its rapidly declining population and the proposal by Vladimir Putin to offer women additional benefits for having more children. Should current trends continue, Russia's population will be an estimated 111 million in 2050, compared with 147 million in 2000, according to the United Nations World Population Prospects report (2004 Revision, medium variant).

== Europe ==
Europe is one of the major geographic regions expected to decline in population in the coming years. Europe's population is forecast to decline by nearly 70 million people by 2050, as the total fertility rate has remained perpetually below the replacement rate. (Further information: Sub-replacement fertility and Population decline)

== Spain ==
- Spain is also facing a declining population, contributing to discussions about birth dearth.
- The country's population decline has raised concerns about its future demographic makeup.
- Specific policies and initiatives may be needed to address the declining fertility rates in Spain and mitigate the impact of birth dearth.

== South Korea ==
- South Korea is experiencing a decline in its population, aligning with the concept of birth dearth.
- Similar to other nations, South Korea's declining fertility rates are leading to discussions about the potential long-term consequences.
- Efforts to address these demographic challenges, such as policy changes or incentives, may be necessary to counteract the effects of birth dearth in South Korea.

== See also ==
- Aging of Europe
- Aging of Japan
- Antinatalism
- Demographic transition
- Human extinction
- Natalism
- Only child
- Population ageing
- Population control
- Population decline
- Reproductive rights
- Tax on childlessness (Roman Jus trium liberorum, Romanian Decree 770) such as Bachelor tax
