= Demographics of the Soviet Union =

- Population pyramid of the Soviet Union as of 1989
- Population: ▲285,742,511 (January 1989)
- Growth rate: ▲0.7% (1990)
- Birth rate: ▼18 births/1,000 population (1990)
- Death rate: ▲10 deaths/1,000 population (1990)
- Life expectancy: ▼69.5 years (1988)
  - male: ▼65 years (1990)
  - female: ▼74 years (1990)
- Fertility rate: ▼2.4 (1990)
- Infant mortality: ▲24 deaths/1,000 live births (1990)
- Net migration rate: ▲1 migrant(s)/1,000 population (1990)

Nationality
- Nationality: noun: Soviet(s) adjective: Soviet
- Major ethnic: Russians (50.8%)
- Minor ethnic: Ukrainians (15.5%); Uzbeks (5.8%); Belarusians (3.5%); Kazakhs (2.8%); Azerbaijanis (2.4%); Tatars (2.3%); Armenians (1.6%); Tajiks (1.5%); Georgians (1.4%); Moldovans (1.2%); Lithuanians (1.1%); Turkmens (1.0%); Kyrgyz (0.9%); Germans (0.7%); Chuvash (0.6%); Latvians (0.5%); Jews (0.5%); Mordvinians (0.4%); Poles (0.4%); Estonians (0.4%); Others (4.7%)

Language
- Official: Russian (Note: De facto, legally since 1990. Constituent republics had the right to declare their own regional languages.)
- Spoken: Languages of the Soviet Union

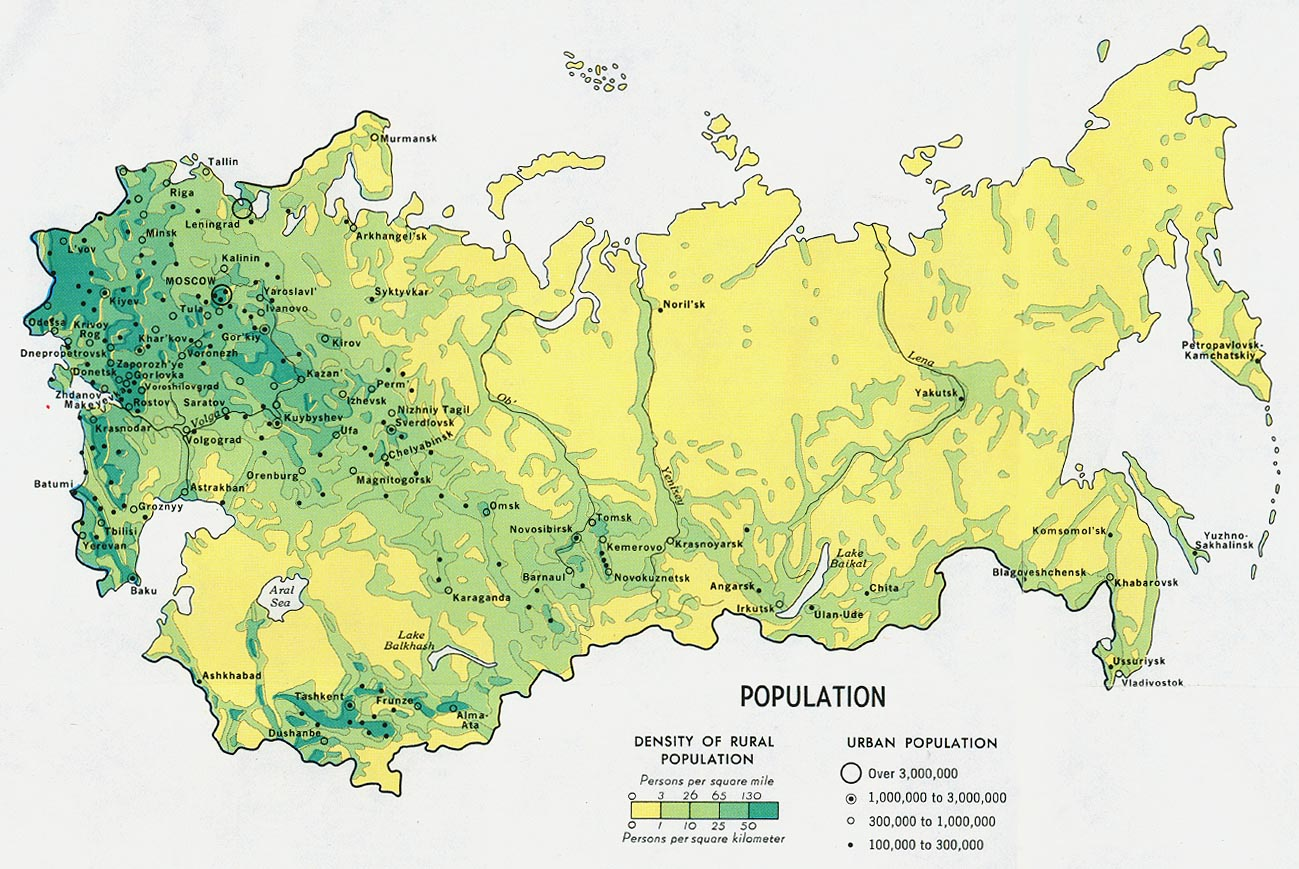
Demographic distribution of the population within the Soviet Union in 1974

Historical population
Year	Pop.	±% p.a.
1920	136,800,000	—
1926	147,027,915	+1.21%
1937	162,039,470	+0.89%
1939	170,557,093	+2.59%
1940	194,077,000	+13.79%
1950	178,547,000	−0.83%
1959	208,826,650	+1.76%
1970	241,720,134	+1.34%
1979	262,084,654	+0.90%
1989	285,742,511	+0.87%
Source: (Note: In 1920, the Bolshevik government took a partial census, which did not include parts Ukraine, the Caucasus, and Central Asia)

Demographic features of the population of the Soviet Union include vital statistics, ethnicity, religious affiliations, education level, health of the populace, and other aspects of the population.

During its existence from 1922 until 1991, the Soviet Union had one of the largest populations in the world. When the last census was taken in 1989, the USSR had the third largest in the world with over 285 million citizens, behind China and India. The former nation was a federal union of national republics, home to hundreds of different ethnicities. By the time the Soviet Union dissolved, Russians were the largest ethnic group by making up nearly 51% of the country. The remaining 49% of Soviet citizens identified with a variety of groups, including Ukrainians, Belarusians, Uzbeks, Kazakhs, Georgians, Jews, etc.

== History ==
=== Revolution and Civil War, 1917–1923 ===
During the Russian Revolution and Civil War period, Russia lost former territories of the Russian Empire with about 30 million inhabitants after the Russian Revolution of 1917 (Poland: 18 million; Finland: 3 million; Romania: 3 million; the Baltic states: 5 million, Kars: 400 thousand). At least 7 million citizens of the former Russian Empire died in the course of the Russian Civil War of 1917–1923, and a further 1 to 2 million emigrated.

=== Interwar period, 1924 to 1939 ===
An estimated 800,000 to 1,200,000 people died during the purges of the 1930s.

=== World War Two, 1939–1945 ===
According to the Russian Academy of Sciences the Soviet Union suffered 26.6 million deaths (1941–1945) during World War II, including an increase in infant mortality of 1.3 million. Total war-loss figures include territories annexed by the Soviet Union in 1939–1945. At this time, the population pyramid was starting to look more triangular.

To counter the population losses, the Soviet government started to push natalist policies, such as a tax on childlessness and an award for mothers called the Mother Heroine.

=== Rejuvenation of the population, 1946–1960s ===
After the Second World War, the population of the Soviet Union began to gradually recover to pre-war levels. By 1959 there were a registered 209,035,000 people, over the 1941 population count of 196,716,000. In 1958–59, Soviet fertility stood at around 2.8 children per woman.

=== Population dynamics in the 1970–1980s ===
The crude birth rate in the Soviet Union throughout its history had been decreasing – from 44.0 per thousand in 1926 to 18.0 in 1974, mostly due to urbanization and rising average age of marriages. The total fertility rate fell from 2.4 in 1969–70 to 2.3 in 1978–79. The crude death rate had been gradually decreasing as well – from 23.7 per thousand in 1926 to 8.7 in 1974. While death rates did not differ greatly across regions of the Soviet Union through much of Soviet history, birth rates in the southern republics of Transcaucasia and Central Asia were much higher than those in the northern parts of the Soviet Union, and in some cases even increased in the post-World War II period. This was partly due to slower rates of urbanization and traditionally early marriages in southern republics.

Mainly as a result of differential birthrates, with most of the European nationalities moving toward sub-replacement fertility and the Central Asian and other nationalities of southern republics having well-above replacement-level fertility, the percentage of the population who were ethnic Russians was gradually being reduced. According to some Western predictions made in the 1990s, if the Soviet Union had stayed together, it is likely that ethnic Russians would have lost their majority status in the 2000s (decade). This differential could not be offset by assimilation of non-Russians by Russians, in part because the nationalities of southern republics maintained a distinct ethnic consciousness and were not easily assimilated.

The late 1960s and the 1970s witnessed a dramatic reversal of the path of declining mortality in the Soviet Union, and was especially notable among men in working ages, and also especially in Russia and other predominantly Slavic areas of the country. While not unique to the Soviet Union (Hungary in particular showed a pattern that was similar to Russia), this male mortality increase, accompanied by a noticeable increase in infant mortality rates in the early 1970s, drew the attention of Western demographers and Sovietologists at the time.

An analysis of the official data from the late 1980s showed that after worsening in the late 1970s and the early 1980s, the situation for adult mortality began to improve again. Referring to data for the two decades ending in 1989–1990, while noting some abatement in adult mortality rates in the Soviet republics in the 1980s, Ward Kingkade and Eduardo Arriaga characterized this situation as follows: "All the former Soviet countries have followed the universal tendency for mortality to decline as infectious diseases are brought under control while death rates from degenerative diseases rise. What is exceptional in the former Soviet countries and some of their East European neighbors is that a subsequent increase in mortality from causes other than infectious disease has brought about overall rises in mortality from all causes combined. Another distinctive characteristic of the former Soviet case is the presence of unusually high levels of mortality from accidents and other external causes, which are typically associated with alcoholism."

The rising infant mortality rates in the Soviet Union in the 1970s became the subject of much discussion and debate among Western demographers. The infant mortality rate (IMR) had increased from 24.7 in 1970 to 27.9 in 1974. Some researchers regarded the rise in infant mortality as largely real, a consequence of worsening health conditions and services. Others regarded it as largely an artifact of improved reporting of infant deaths, and found the increases to be concentrated in the Central Asian republics where improvement in coverage and reporting of births and deaths might well have the greatest effect on increasing the published rates.

The rising reported adult mortality and infant mortality was not explained or defended by Soviet officials at the time. Instead, they simply stopped publishing all mortality statistics for ten years. Soviet demographers and health specialists remained silent about the mortality increases until the late 1980s, when the publication of mortality data resumed and researchers could delve into the real and artificial aspects of the reported mortality increases. When these researchers began to report their findings, they accepted the increases in adult male mortality as real and focused their research on explaining its causes and finding solutions. In contrast, investigations of the rise in reported infant mortality concluded that while the reported increases in the IMR were largely an artifact of improved reporting of infant deaths in the Central Asian republics, the actual levels in this region were much higher than had yet been reported officially. In this sense, the reported rise in infant mortality in the Soviet Union as a whole was an artifact of improved statistical reporting, but reflected the reality of a much higher actual infant mortality level than had previously been recognized in official statistics.

As the detailed data series that was ultimately published in the late 1980s showed, the reported IMR for the Soviet Union as a whole increased from 24.7 in 1970 to a peak of 31.4 in 1976. After that the IMR gradually decreased and by 1989 it had fallen to 22.7, which was lower than had been reported in any previous year (though close to the figure of 22.9 in 1971). In 1989, the IMR ranged from a low of 11.1 in the Latvian SSR to a high of 54.7 in the Turkmen SSR.

Research conducted after the dissolution of the Soviet Union revealed that the originally reported mortality rates vary substantially underestimated the actual rates, especially for infant mortality. This has been shown for Transcaucasian and Central Asian republics.

After two decades of declining and stagnating fertility rates, the Soviet TFR rose from 2.27 in 1978–79 to 2.51 in 1986–87. Most Muslim areas of the USSR continued to fall, while non-Muslim regions rose slightly.

== Population ==
View source data.

Demographics of Soviet Union, Data of Andreev, E.M., et al., Naselenie Sovetskogo Soiuza, 1922–1991. Number of inhabitants in thousands.

Although the population growth-rate decreased over time, it remained positive throughout the history of the Soviet Union in all republics, and the population grew each year by more than 2 million except during periods of wartime, and famine.

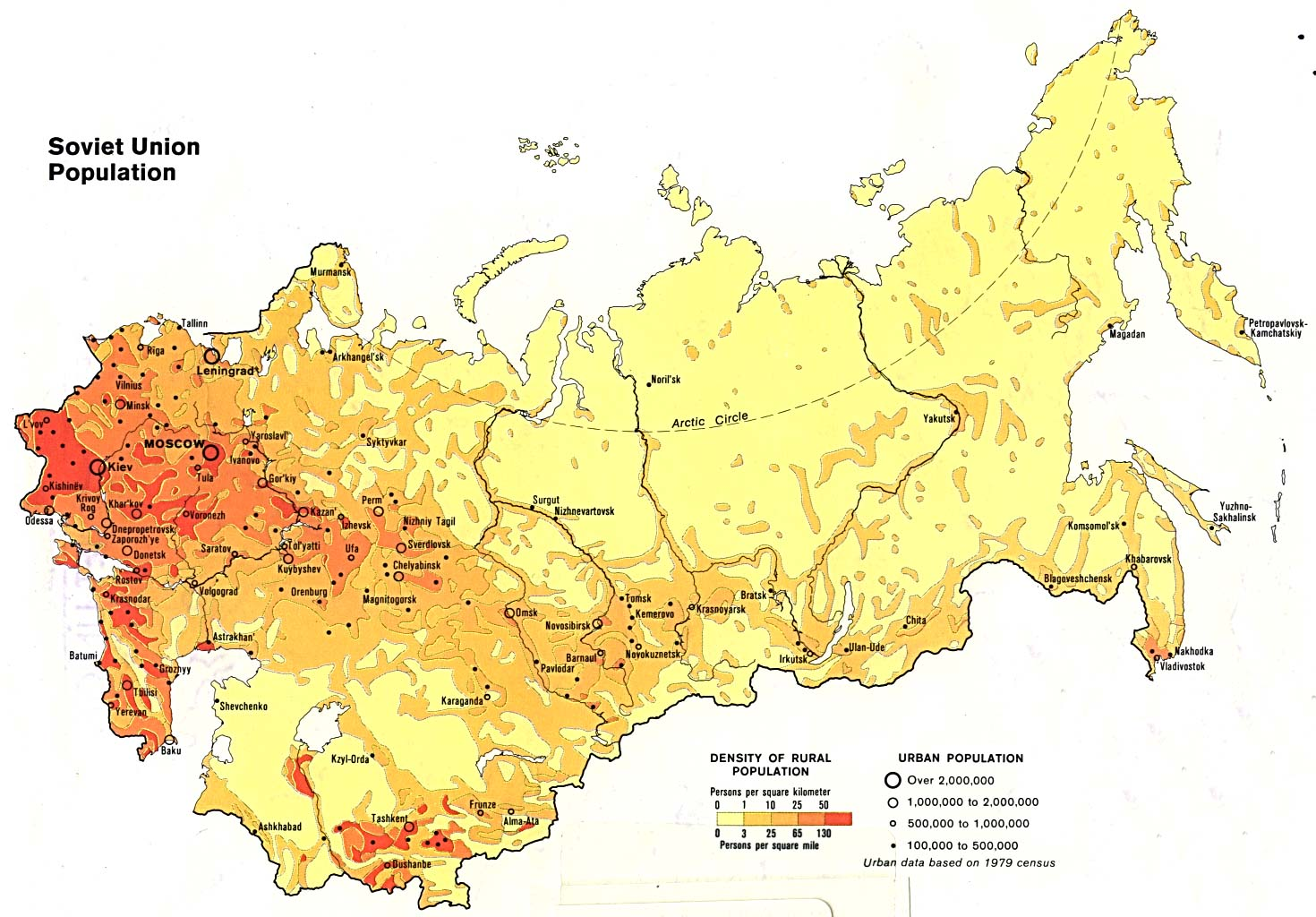
Soviet Union urban and rural population density map 1982

=== Age structure ===
Population pyramid of the Soviet Union in 1926

Population pyramid of the Soviet Union in 1939

Population pyramid before and after the Second World War

1941

1946

Population pyramid of the Soviet Union in 1950

Population pyramid of the Soviet Union in 1989

=== Literacy ===
- 99.8% (1980)

=== Labor force ===
Labor force: 152,300,000 civilians; 80% industry and other nonagricultural fields, 20% agriculture; shortage of skilled labor (1989)

Organized labor: 98% of workers were union members; all trade unions were organized within the All-Union Central Council of Trade Unions (AUCCTU) and conducted their work under the guidance of the Communist party. There was a market relationship between the people and the state as the employer; people were free to choose their job and leave if they wished, although members of the Communist Party of the Soviet Union could be ordered to work in certain places, but seldom were.

Class composition of the USSR's population by percentage
Year	Class				
Year	Workers	Individual Peasants	Collective Peasants	White Collar	Bourgeoisie Landowner
1913	14.6	66.7	n/a	2.4	16.3
1924	10.4	75.4		4.4	8.5
1928	12.4	74.9	2.9	5.2	4.6
1939	33.7	2.6	47.6	16.5	n/a
1959	50.2	0.3	31.4	18.1	n/a
1970	57.4	n/a	20.5	22.1	n/a
1979	60	n/a	14.9	25.1	n/a
1987	61.8	n/a	12	26.2	n/a

=== Life expectancy and infant mortality ===
A newborn Soviet child in 1926–27 had a life expectancy of 44.4 years, up from 32.3 years in the Russian Empire thirty years before. By 1958–59, the life expectancy for newborns had reached 68.6 years. Life expectancy in the Soviet Union remained fairly stable during most years, although in the 1970s it decreased slightly.

== Vital statistics ==
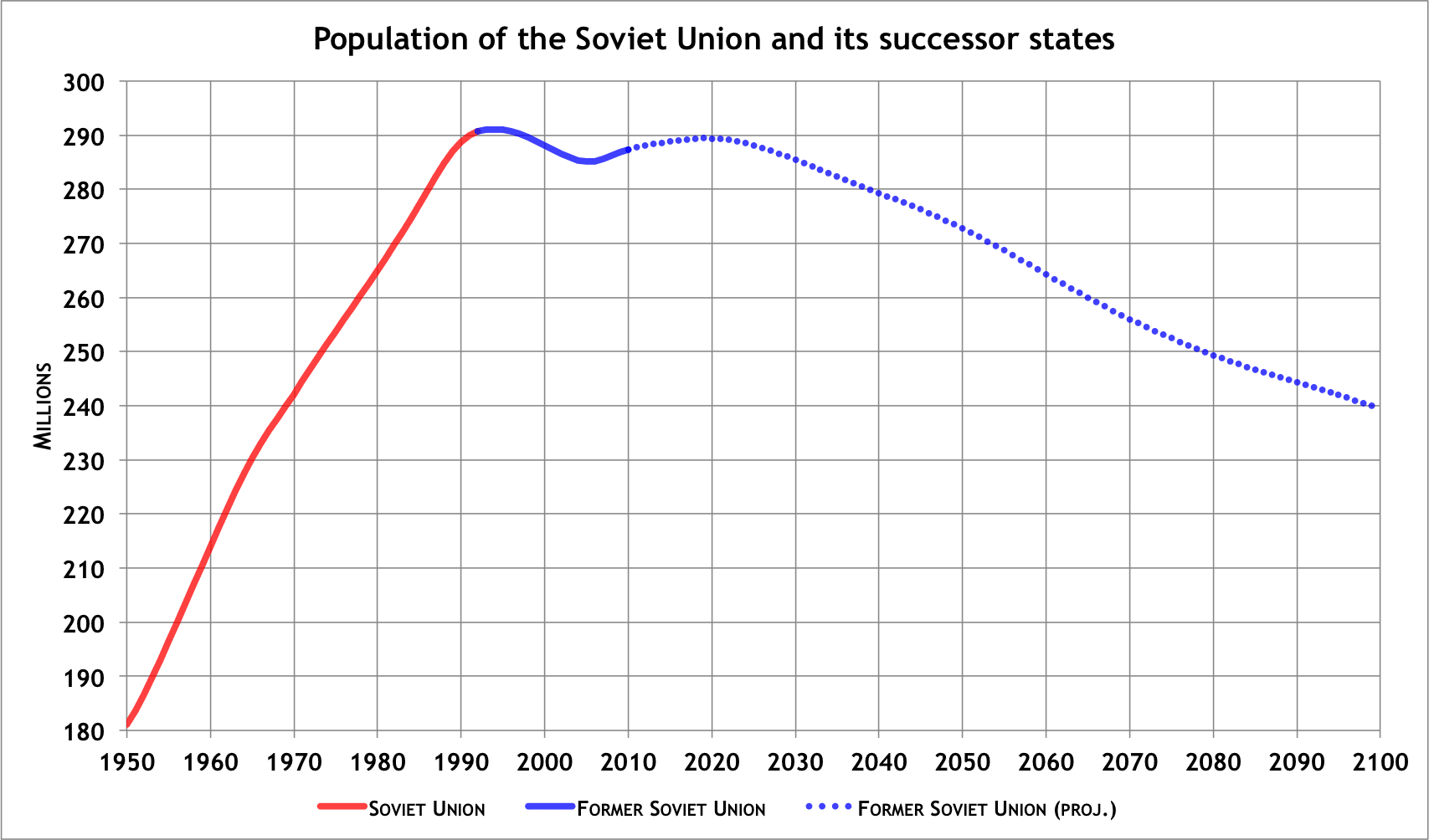
Soviet Union and Former Soviet Union Population from 1950 to 2100.

=== Soviet demographic table, 1950–1991 ===
	January population (thousand)	Live births (thousand)	Deaths (thousand)	Natural change (thousand)	Crude birth rate (per 1,000)	Crude death rate (per 1,000)	Natural change (per 1,000)	Crude migration change (per 1,000)	Total fertility rate (Note: In fertility rates, 2.1 and above is a stable population and has been marked blue, 2 and below leads to an aging population and the result is that the population decreases.)
1950	179,020	4,805	1,745	3,060	26.7	9.7	17.0	0.3	3.08
1951	181,582	4,953	1,779	3,174	27.0	9.7	17.3	–3.4	3.10
1952	185,966	5,028	1,749	3,279	26.5	9.4	17.1	5.9	3.03
1953	188,127	4,754	1,727	3,027	25.1	9.1	16.0	–4.6	2.85
1954	191,569	5,179	1,724	3,455	26.6	8.9	17.7	–0.1	3.04
1955	194,409	5,048	1,613	3,435	25.7	8.2	17.5	–3.1	2.93
1956	197,880	5,023	1,511	3,512	25.2	7.6	17.6	–0.2	2.91
1957	201,355	5,164	1,594	3,570	25.4	7.8	17.6	–0.5	2.94
1958	204,963	5,240	1,490	3,750	25.3	7.2	18.1	–0.7	2.92
1959	208,827	5,264	1,604	3,660	25.0	7.6	17.4	1.0	
1960	212,417	5,341	1,529	3,812	24.9	7.1	17.8	–1.0	
1961	216,307	5,192	1,563	3,629	23.9	7.2	16.7	1.2	
1962	220,017	4,959	1,667	3,292	22.4	7.5	14.9	1.9	
1963	223,457	4,758	1,627	3,131	21.1	7.2	13.9	1.4	
1964	226,665	4,457	1,581	2,876	19.5	6.9	12.6	1.5	
1965	229,616	4,253	1,690	2,563	18.4	7.3	11.1	1.7	
1966	232,220	4,242	1,711	2,531	18.2	7.3	10.9	0.3	
1967	234,800	4,093	1,799	2,294	17.3	7.6	9.7	1.2	
1968	237,209	4,088	1,833	2,255	17.2	7.7	9.5	0.6	
1969	239,507	4,087	1,957	2,130	17.0	8.1	8.9	0.7	
1970	241,720	4,226	1,996	2,230	17.4	8.2	9.2	–0.1	
1971	243,950	4,372	2,015	2,357	17.8	8.2	9.6	–0.5	
1972	246,254	4,404	2,105	2,299	17.8	8.5	9.3	0.0	
1973	248,613	4,386	2,164	2,222	17.6	8.7	8.9	0.6	
1974	250,865	4,546	2,191	2,355	18.0	8.7	9.3	–0.4	
1975	253,279	4,611	2,363	2,248	18.1	9.3	8.8	0.7	
1976	255,463	4,720	2,426	2,294	18.4	9.5	8.9	–0.4	
1977	257,892	4,693	2,495	2,198	18.1	9.6	8.5	0.9	
1978	260,125	4,763	2,546	2,217	18.2	9.7	8.5	0.1	
1979	262,436	4,807	2,666	2,141	18.2	10.1	8.1	0.6	
1980	264,530	4,851	2,744	2,107	18.3	10.3	8.0	0.0	
1981	266,629	4,961	2,742	2,219	18.5	10.2	8.3	–0.5	
1982	268,841	5,100	2,724	2,376	19.0	10.1	8.9	–0.6	
1983	271,227	5,392	2,823	2,569	19.8	10.4	9.4	–0.7	
1984	273,769	5,387	2,965	2,422	19.6	10.8	8.8	0.4	
1985	276,310	5,374	2,947	2,427	19.4	10.6	8.8	0.4	
1986	278,845	5,611	2,737	2,874	20.0	9.8	10.2	–1.2	
1987	281,537	5,599	2,805	2,794	19.8	9.9	9.9	–0.4	2.53
1988	284,049	5,381	2,889	2,492	18.9	10.1	8.8	0.1	2.45
1989	286,731	5,062	2,875	2,187	17.6	10.0	7.6	1.7	2.33
1990	288,624	4,853	2,985	1,868	16.8	10.3	6.5	0.1	2.26
1991	290,034	4,756	3,206	1,550	16.4	11.1	5.3	–0.5	

=== Abortion ===
Year	Abortions in the USSR from 1954 – 1990 (Soviet Union)								
Year	All abortions			Legal induced abortions ('complete')			Spontaneous or criminal abortions ('incomplete')	Legal abortion rate	
Year	Total figures	By Ministry of Health	By Ministry of Transport	All methods (Total legal)	Curettage	Aspiration ('mini')	Spontaneous or criminal abortions ('incomplete')	per 100 live birthes	per 1,000 women aged 15 – 49
1954	1,985,302	1,895,964	89,339	399,046	399,046	–	1,586,257	7.84	6.84
1955	2,598,761	2,481,816	116,944	600,314	600,314	–	1,998,447	11.92	10.15
1956	4,724,547	4,511,942	212,605	3,316,632	3,316,632	–	1,407,915	65.10	55.40
1957	5,338,738	5,108,970	229,768	3,996,159	3,996,159	–	1,342,579	76.81	66.26
1958	6,128,871	5,892,260	236,611	4,844,567	4,844,567	–	1,284,304	92.24	80.62
1959	6,398,541	6,211,160	187,381	5,102,306	5,102,306	–	1,296,235	96.21	85.79
1960	7,038,395	6,504,677	533,718	5,642,210	5,642,210	–	1,396,185	107.17	96.06
1961	7,425,507	7,073,785	351,722	6,006,038	6,006,038	–	1,419,469	118.39	103.57
1962	7,774,506	7,344,506	430,000	6,414,217	6,414,217	–	1,360,289	132.08	110.19
1963	8,023,290	7,662,242	361,048	6,667,354	6,667,354	–	1,355,936	144.82	114.64
1964	8,408,408	8,030,030	378,378	7,021,021	7,021,021	–	1,387,387	161.30	120.23
1965	8,551,351	8,166,540	384,811	7,191,686	7,191,686	–	1,359,665	169.33	122.46
1966	8,337,567	7,962,377	375,191	7,020,232	7,020,232	–	1,317,336	168.52	118.15
1967	7,846,354	7,493,268	353,086	6,624,990	6,624,990	–	1,222,364	161.94	109.72
1968	7,654,441	7,301,396	344,045	6,471,055	6,471,055	–	1,174,386	158.32	105.25
1969	7,460,316	7,124,602	335,714	6,330,413	6,330,413	–	1,129,903	152.26	101.84
1970	7,531,270	7,192,363	338,907	6,406,594	6,406,594	–	1,124,676	148.99	101.44
1971	7,610,001	7,267,551	342,450	6,489,481	6,489,481	–	1,120,520	147.89	101.07
1972	7,497,264	7,159,887	337,377	6,408,802	6,408,802	–	1,088,462	144.45	98.27
1973	7,514,765	7,176,601	338,164	6,439,040	6,439,040	–	1,075,725	145.48	97.50
1974	7,449,129	7,113,918	335,211	6,397,731	6,397,731	–	1,051,398	139.71	95.89
1975	7,471,572	7,135,351	336,221	6,431,773	6,431,773	–	1,039,798	137.65	95.68
1976	7,636,191	7,292,562	343,629	6,588,364	6,588,364	–	1,047,827	140.09	97.22
1977	7,579,105	7,238,045	341,060	6,553,674	6,553,674	–	1,025,430	138.70	96.22
1978	7,497,397	7,160,014	337,383	6,497,226	6,497,226	–	1,000,171	136.12	94.98
1979	7,339,566	7,009,286	330,380	6,374,161	6,374,161	–	965,406	131.63	93.21
1980	7,333,073	7,003,085	329,988	6,382,028	6,382,028	–	951,045	130.49	93.18
1981	7,155,594	6,833,592	322,002	6,240,562	6,240,562	–	915,032	124.57	91.17
1982	7,250,355	6,924,089	326,266	6,336,188	6,336,188	–	914,167	120.29	92.13
1983	7,085,370	6,766,528	318,842	6,204,515	6,204,515	–	880,855	115.07	90.05
1984	7,115,825	6,795,613	320,212	6,243,572	6,243,572	–	872,253	115.70	89.98
1985	7,365,852	7,034,389	331,463	6,475,595	6,475,595	–	890,258	118.64	92.77
1986	7,116,000	6,790,141	325,859	6,267,984	6,267,984	–	848,016	110.62	89.47
1987	6,818,000	6,496,499	321,501	6,009,655	6,009,655	–	808,345	109.33	85.71
1988	7,229,000	6,965,221	263,779	6,469,096	5,271,096	1,198,000	759,904	124.16	92.42
1989	6,974,431	6,672,041	302,390	6,286,035	4,828,267	1,457,768	688,396	126.89	90.03
1990	6,459,000	6,226,821	232,179	5,836,823	4,150,448	1,686,375	622,177	123.57	84.77
1991	–	6,014,000	–	–	–	–	–	–	–
1992	–	5,442,900	–	–	–	–	–	–	–
Total number from time period	258,723,655(1954–1990)	258,476,032 (1954–92)	11,695,624 (1954–90)	216,987,139(1954–90)	212,644,996 (1954–1990)	4,342,143 (1988–90)	41,728,518 (1954–90)	–	–

Ethnic makeup of the Soviet Union visualised

== Ethnic groups ==
The Soviet Union was one of the world's most ethnically diverse countries, with more than 100 distinct national ethnicities living within its borders.

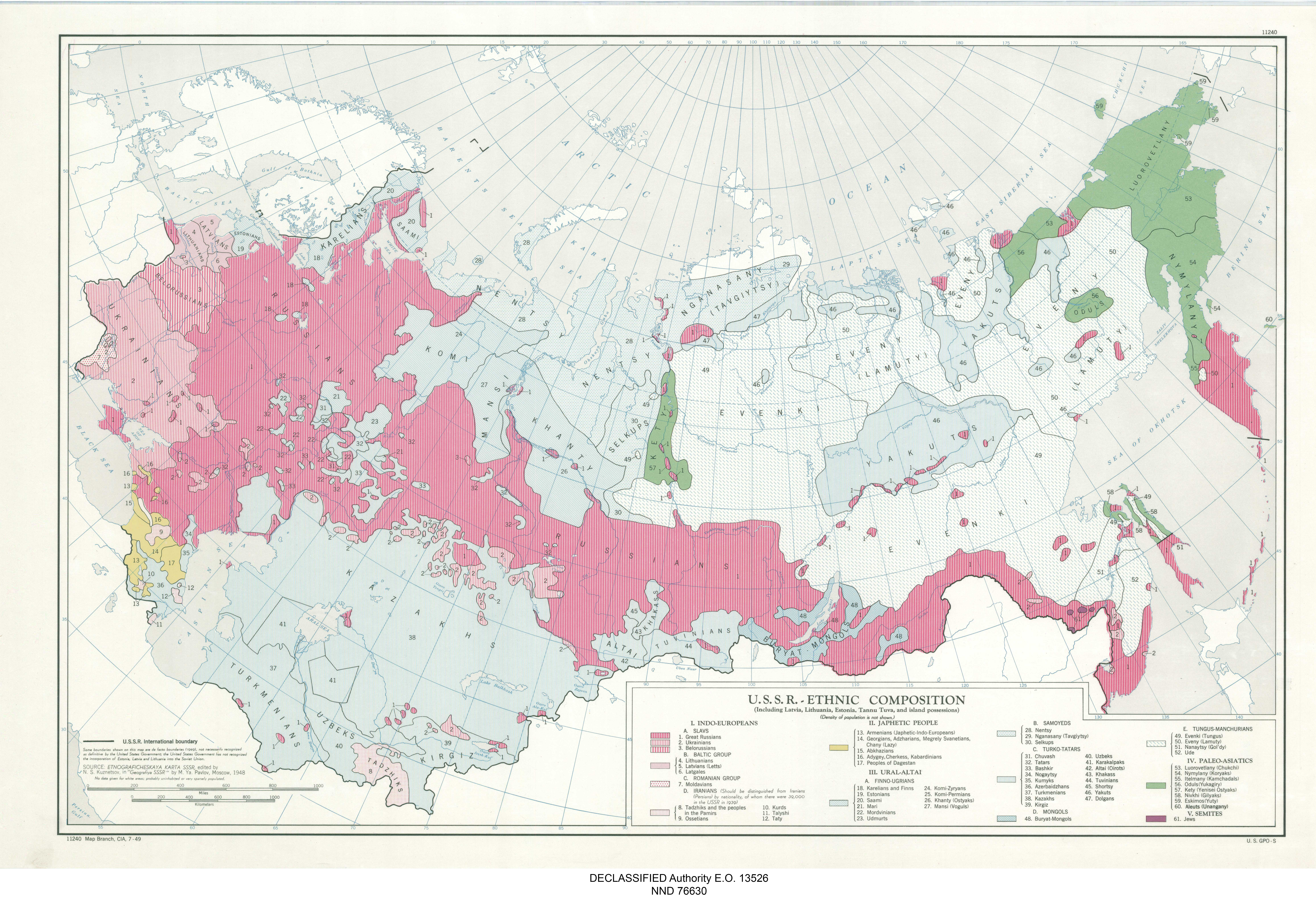
U.S.S.R. - Ethnic Composition by the Central Intelligence Agency 1949.

=== Statistics (1926–1989) ===
Ethnic group	Year													
Ethnic group	1926		1937		1939		1959		1970		1979		1989	
Ethnic group	Number	%	Number	%	Number	%	Number	%	Number	%	Number	%	Number	%
East Slavs	113,725,023	77.3%	125,228,338	77.3%	132,977,920	78%	159,279,997	76.2%	178,820,141	74%	189,207,191	72.2%	199,377,746	69.8%
Russians	77,791,124	52.9%	93,933,065	58.1%	99,591,520	58.4%	114,113,579	54.6%	129,015,140	53.4%	137,397,089	52.4%	145,155,489	50.8%
Ukrainians	31,194,976	21.2%	26,421,212	16.3%	28,111,007	16.5%	37,252,930	17.8%	40,753,246	16.9%	42,347,387	16.2%	44,186,006	15.5%
Belarusians	4,738,923	3.2%	4,874,061	3.0%	5,275,393	3.1%	7,913,488	3.8%	9,051,755	3.7%	9,462,715	3.6%	10,036,251	3.5%
Baltic	337,832	0.2%	167,721	0.1%	290,689	0.2%	4,714,249	2.3%	5,102,144	2.1%	5,309,793	2%	5,553,025	2%
Lithuanians	41,463	–	9,801	–	32,624	–	2,326,094	1.1%	2,664,944	1.1%	2,850,905	1.1%	3,067,390	1.1%
Latvians	141,703	0.1%	66,843	–	114,476	0.1%	1,399,539	0.7%	1,429,844	0.6%	1,439,037	0.5%	1,458,986	0.5%
Estonians	154,666	0.1%	91,077	0.1%	143,589	0.1%	988,616	0.5%	1,007,356	0.4%	1,019,851	0.4%	1,026,649	0.4%
Central Asia	10,378,267	7.1%	10,145,211	6.3%	10,872,278	6.3%	13,004,209	6.3%	19,607,300	8.1%	25,844,301	9.9%	34,306,926	12%
Uzbeks	3,904,622	2.7%	4,550,532	2.8%	4,845,140	2.8%	6,015,416	2.9%	9,195,093	3.8%	12,455,978	4.8%	16,697,825	5.8%
Kazakhs	3,968,289	2.7%	2,862,458	1.8%	3,100,949	1.8%	3,621,610	1.7%	5,298,818	2.2%	6,556,442	2.5%	8,135,818	2.8%
Kyrgyz	762,736	0.5%	846,503	0.5%	884,615	0.5%	968,659	0.5%	1,452,222	0.6%	1,906,271	0.7%	2,528,946	0.9%
Tajiks	978,680	0.7%	1,137,995	0.7%	1,229,170	0.7%	1,396,939	0.7%	2,135,883	0.9%	2,897,697	1.1%	4,215,372	1.5%
Turkmens	763,940	0.5%	747,723	0.5%	812,404	0.5%	1,001,585	0.5%	1,525,284	0.6%	2,027,913	0.8%	2,728,965	1%
Caucasus	5,095,357	3.5%	6,200,040	3.8%	6,678,174	3.9%	8,418,590	4%	11,184,388	4.6%	13,199,075	5.1%	15,374,680	5.4%
Azerbaijanis	1,706,605	1.2%	2,134,250	1.3%	2,275,678	1.3%	2,939,728	1.4%	4,379,937	1.8%	5,477,330	2.1%	6,770,403	2.4%
Georgians	1,821,184	1.2%	2,097,069	1.3%	2,249,636	1.3%	2,691,950	1.3%	3,245,300	1.3%	3,570,504	1.4%	3,981,045	1.4%
Armenians	1,567,568	1.1%	1,968,721	1.2%	2,152,860	1.3%	2,786,912	1.3%	3,559,151	1.5%	4,151,241	1.6%	4,623,232	1.6%
Other prominent ethnic groups	11,060,350	7.5%	11,695,804	7.2%	13,329,325	7.8%	16,143,803	7.7%	17,791,480	7.4%	18,316,932	7%	18,989,883	6.6%
Moldovans	278,905	0.2%	223,848	0.1%	260,418	0.2%	2,214,139	1.1%	2,697,994	1.1%	2,968,224	1.1%	3,352,352	1.2%
Jews	2,672,499	1.8%	2,715,105	1.7%	3,028,538	1.8%	2,267,814	1.1%	2,099,833	0.9%	1,761,724	0.7%	1,378,344	0.5%
Germans	1,238,549	0.8%	1,151,602	0.7%	1,427,232	0.8%	1,619,655	0.8%	1,846,317	0.8%	1,936,214	0.7%	2,038,603	0.7%
Tatars	2,916,536	2%	3,793,412	2.4%	4,313,488	2.5%	4,917,991	2.4%	5,783,111	2.4%	6,185,196	2.4%	6,648,760	2.3%
Poles	782,334	0.5%	636,220	0.4%	630,097	0.4%	1,380,282	0.7%	1,167,523	0.5%	1,150,991	0.4%	1,126,334	0.4%
Chuvash	1,117,419	0.8%	1,168,817	0.7%	1,369,574	0.8%	1,469,766	0.7%	1,694,351	0.7%	1,751,366	0.7%	1,842,346	0.6%
Mordvinian	1,340,415	0.9%	1,248,861	0.8%	1,456,330	0.9%	1,285,116	0.6%	1,262,670	0.5%	1,191,765	0.5%	1,153,987	0.4%
Bashkir	713,693	0.5%	757,935	0.5%	843,648	0.5%	989,040	0.5%	1,239,681	0.5%	1,371,452	0.5%	1,449,157	0.5%
Others	6,431,086	4.4%	8,602,356	5.3%	6,408,707	3.8%	7,216,092	3.5%	9,214,681	3.8%	10,207,362	3.9%	12,140,251	4.2%
Total:	147,027,915	100%	162,039,470	100%	170,557,093	100%	208,826,650	100%	241,720,134	100%	262,084,654	100%	285,742,511	100%

Other ethnic groups included Abkhaz, Adyghes, Aleuts, Assyrians, Avars, Bulgarians, Buryats, Chechens, Chinese, Crimean Tatars, Evenks, Finns, Gagauz, Greeks, Hungarians, Ingushes, Inuit, Kalmyks, Karakalpaks, Karelians, Kets, Koreans, Lezgins, Maris, Mongols, Nenetses, Ossetians, Roma, Romanians, Tats, Tuvans, Udmurts, and Yakuts. Dozens of these other ethnic groups were the titular nations of different Autonomous Soviet Socialist Republics or Autonomous Oblasts within the union-level republics (ex. Tatars in Tatar ASSR within the RSFSR, Abkhaz ASSR within Georgia) or had been previously (Volga German ASSR, Crimean ASSR).

=== History ===
Throughout its entire history, ethnic Russians made up a majority of Soviet citizens. According to the 1939 census, Russians reached a peak of 58.4% of the population. Previously in 1926, Russians were 52.9% of the population.

Since 1939, the percentage of ethnic Russians in the USSR began to decrease. By 1959, 54.6% of Soviet citizens were recorded as ethnic Russians. At first, this was due to the incorporation of new territories westward in Europe after World War II, such as the Polish Eastern Borderlands, the Baltic states, Carpathian Ruthenia, and Bessarabia. This resulted in an increase of non-Russian ethnic groups, especially those who were Belarusian, Ukrainian, Polish, Moldovan, Lithuanian, Latvian, and Estonian. However, starting in the 1960s, the decline of the Russian majority was mainly driven by indigenous ethnic groups residing in the Caucasian and Central Asian Soviet republics. For example, the five main Central Asian groups, Uzbeks, Kazakhs, Kyrgyz, Tajiks, and Turkmens, together saw a 163.81% increase from 1959 to 1989. Azerbaijanis, the largest Muslim group in the Soviet Caucasus, grew from 2.9 million people to almost 6.8 million during the same time, which represents a 130.31% increase. Meanwhile, ethnic Russians increased by only 27.20%. When the 1989 census was released, ethnic Russians made up just 50.8% of the population and were projected to become a minority within the next decade.

The rise of non-Russians, especially Soviet Muslims from the Caucasus and Central Asia, can be explained by analysing the different patterns of total fertility rates among ethnic groups. According to research professors Barbara A. Anderson and Brian D. Silver, Soviet fertility was both high and low. The national rate stood at 2.8 children per woman in 1958–59 before falling to 2.4 in 1969–70 and 2.3 in 1978–79. The total fertility for ethnic Russian women within the RSFSR declined from 2.4 to 1.8 in the late 1960s and 1970s. The same trend could be found in the Baltic and Western regions of the USSR, which each of the Soviet republics' titular nationality approaching sub-replacement fertility. Caucasian ethnic groups, such as Armenians and Georgians followed the same trend, but on average had more children than Soviet citizens living in the Soviet European republics. Overall, the mentioned ethnicities had an average total fertility rate between 1.8 and 2.3 by 1978–79. In contrast, Soviet Muslim women had much higher fertility rates. In 1969–70, the average Muslim woman had 7 children, which represents an increase from 6.2 in 1958–59. Despite decreasing to 5.6 in 1978–79 and further falling in the 1980s, the birth rate amongst Soviet Muslims remained consistently higher than those who were non-Muslims.

== Religion ==
The Soviet Union promoted state atheism from 1928 to 1941, in which religion was largely discouraged and heavily persecuted. The USSR remained a secular state from 1945 until its dissolution. However, according to various Soviet and Western sources, over one-third of the country's people professed religious beliefs: Russian Orthodox 20%, Muslim 10%, Protestant, Georgian Orthodox, Armenian Orthodox, and Roman Catholic 7%, Jewish less than 1%, atheist 60% (1990 est.). Some indigenous pagan belief systems existed in the Siberian and Russian Far Eastern lands in the local populations.

In 1939, 86.9% of Soviet Jews were living in urban areas and over half in the 11 largest cities in the country.

== Language ==
Russian became the official language of the Soviet Union in 1990. Until that time it was still necessary to have a language of common communication. The de facto result inevitably favored Russian, the native language of half of Soviet citizens.

Overall Soviet citizens spoke more than 200 languages and dialects (at least 18 with more than 1 million speakers); Slavic group: 75%, other Indo-European: 8%, Altaic: 12%, Uralic: 3%, Caucasian: 2% (1990 est.)

== Demographics of the Post-Soviet states ==
- Armenia
- Azerbaijan
- Belarus
- Estonia
- (Georgia (country)) Georgia
- Kazakhstan
- Kyrgyzstan
- Latvia
- Lithuania
- Moldova
- Russia
- Tajikistan
- Turkmenistan
- Ukraine
- Uzbekistan

== See also ==
- Demographics of Central Asia
- Religion in the Soviet Union
- Family in the Soviet Union
- List of Russian censuses
- Demographics of Russia
- Tax on childlessness

== General sources ==
1. CIA World Factbook 1991 – most figures, unless attributed to another source.
2. J. A. Newth: The 1970 Soviet Census, Soviet Studies vol. 24, issue 2 (October 1972) pp. 200–222. – Population figures from 1897 to 1970.
3. The Russian State Archive of the Economy: Soviet Censuses of 1937 and 1939 – Population figures for 1937 and 1939. https://web.archive.org/web/20020927142010/http://www.library.yale.edu/slavic/census3739.html
