= Zero population growth =

Population neither growing nor declining

Zero population growth, sometimes abbreviated ZPG, is a condition of demographic balance where the number of people in a specified population neither grows nor declines; that is, the number of births plus in-migrants equals the number of deaths plus out-migrants. The Zero Population Growth organization, founded by biologist Paul R. Ehrlich, induced a prominent political movement since the 1960s, aiming to reach zero population growth.

The movement considers zero population growth to be an objective towards which countries and the whole world should strive in the interests of accomplishing long-term optimal standards and conditions of living. It faces substantial support as well as criticism, involving different groups of people in society.

== Definition ==
The growth rate of a human population in a given year equals the number of births minus the number of deaths plus immigration minus emigration expressed as a percentage of the population at the beginning of the given year.

For example, suppose a country begins a year with one million people and during the year experiences one hundred thousand births, eighty thousand deaths, one thousand immigrants and two hundred emigrants.

Change in population = 100,000 – 80,000 +1,000 – 200 = 20,800

Population growth rate = (20,800 ÷ 1,000,000) x 100% = 2.1%

Zero population growth for a country occurs when the sum of these four numbers – births minus deaths plus immigration minus emigration - is zero.

To illustrate, suppose a country begins the year with one million people and during the year experiences 85,000 births, 86,000 deaths, 1,500 immigrants and 500 emigrants.

Change in population = 85,000 – 86,000 + 1,500 – 500 = 0

Population growth rate = (0 ÷ 1,000,000) x 100% = 0%

For the planet Earth as a whole, zero population growth occurs when the number of births equals the number of deaths.

== History ==
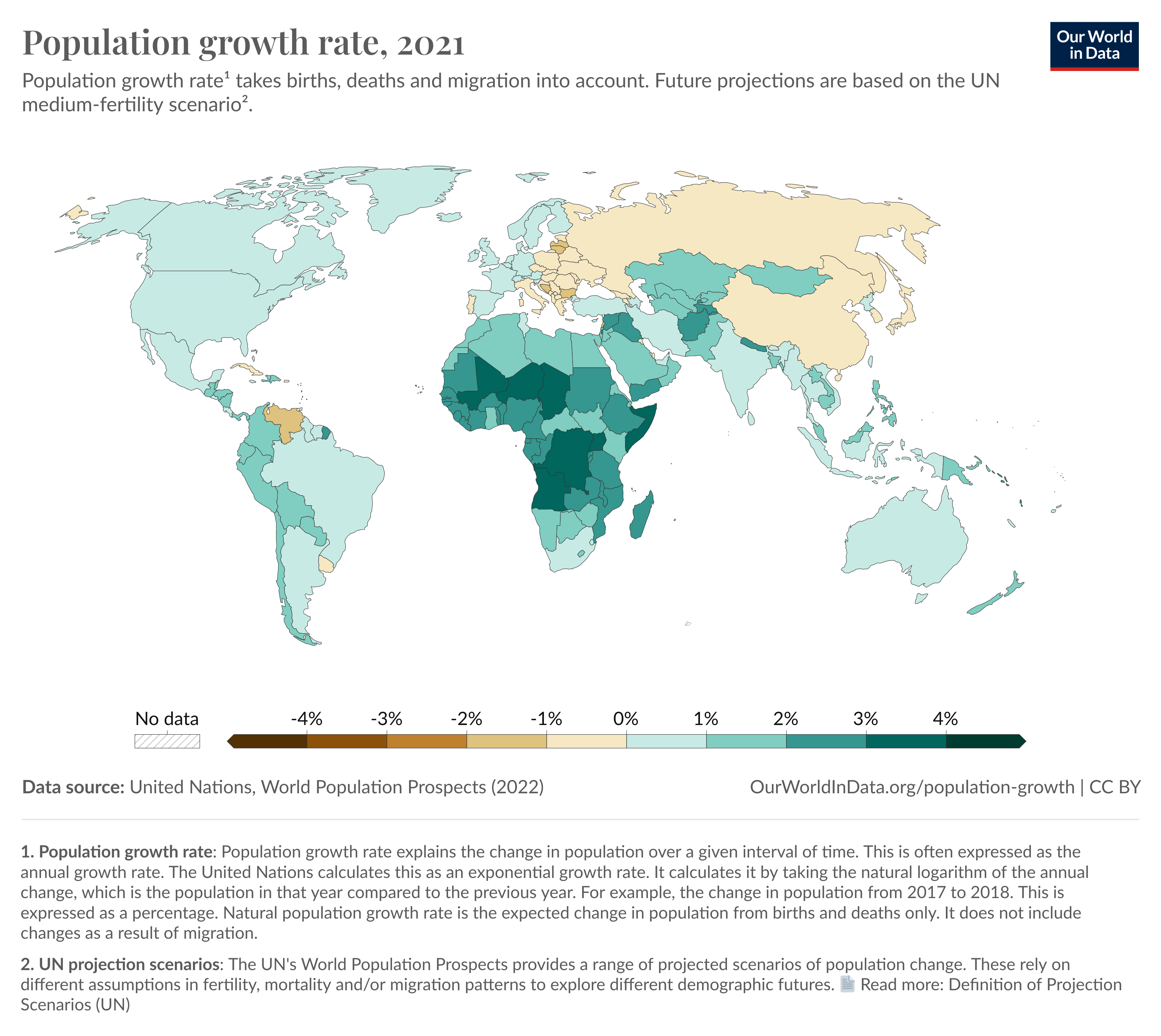
Global rates of population growth and decline (2021–2022); population growth rate takes birth, death, and migration rates into account. Future projections are based on the United Nations World Population Prospects (from 1950 until 2100).

Map of countries by total fertility rate (2022–2023), referring to the average number of children that are born to a woman over her lifetime, according to the Population Reference Bureau

=== Coining the term ===
The American sociologist and demographer Kingsley Davis is credited for coining the term "zero population growth" (ZPG) in 1967 by discussing the negative consequences of an uncontrollably growing population and suggesting a population growth below zero as the solution across nations. Although the term "zero population growth" was first introduced by Davis, the concept of a "stationary population", which means a population that is stable and unchanging in size, was referred to earlier by George J. Stolnitz in his "A Century of International Mortality Trends: I". A stable population requires a constant fertility and mortality rates with no immigration. When the constant rate of population increase equals zero, the stable population becomes stationary. Stolnitz stated that this concept dated back at least to 1693, when it showed up in Edmond Halley's recording of Breslau's population, the first life table on demographic data. A mathematical description was given by James Mirrlees.

=== Fear of overpopulation ===
World population grew slowly for most of human history. The net population in the past 200 years is seven times the growth in the rest of human history. Population growth first started to accelerate after the Agricultural Revolution in 1650, and it caused people to first concern about overpopulation because they feared the growth of population would eventually outrun the growth in food production. Similar concerns reemerged after WWII because some people believed that the war was triggered by the competition over scarce resources among the Axis nations. By the late 1960s, environmental exploitation and famine in Africa enhanced the concern of overpopulation. The idea of zero population growth emerged as a solution to mitigate the ongoing problems.

=== Zero Population Growth organization (ZPGO) ===
In the post-war period, the Western world experienced a baby boom (1945–1968 period) that statistically links to the increased female employment during wartime. Responding to the postwar population growth, ZPG became a prominent political movement in the U.S. and parts of Europe, with strong links to environmentalism and feminism in the late 1960s. Biologists Paul R. Ehrlich accused overpopulation as the single cause to environmental issues occurred during the 1960s in his famous work The Population Bomb published in 1968. The same year, Ehrlich, along with entomologist Charles Remington and lawyer Richard Bowers, founded the Zero Population Growth Organization in Connecticut, with a goal to reduce family sizes among Americans. The organization quickly expanded, attracting membership of 36,000 by May, 1971. In 1970, ZPGO set its lobbying office in Washington, D.C. Among the ZPGO activists, Yale University was a stronghold. Yale University and many other ZPGO members believed that the non-stopping growing population causes many environmental and societal problems, as well as threatens the individual values and privacy.

==== Controversy ====
Upon the establishment of the ZPGO, it faced a great amount of support as well as criticisms. The debate over its purpose and mission involved the possibility of zero population growth, its impact on economy as well as on cultural and personal values.

===== Possibility and necessity =====
There were several criticisms against the Zero Population Growth movement. ZPGO activists were accused for turning against the science of demographic growth and asking for an immediate drop in fertility. Critics also said that the activists are recommending something inevitable in the future, questioning the necessity of their efforts. American demographer and sociologist Judith Blake, a member of the ZPG movement, responded by accepting that ZPG is the only possibility in the future. Nevertheless, if people passively waited for it to happen, ZPG would eventually be reached through high mortality rather than low fertility.

===== Cultural and personal values =====
Besides the idea proposed by ZPGO, their approaches also caught debate. Characterized as "seriously debatable" by Life magazine, ZPGO received public questioning as it challenged the traditional American value of being a growing society. Criticisms involved that the organization uses coercive approaches that threatens the fundamental human right of giving birth and freedom of family planning. ZPGO also faced critics for involving racist and nativist beliefs. Nevertheless, NPGO activists argued that women were not free before the movement because they were subject to the pressure of giving birth. Instead of denying childbirth, ZPGO claimed that by promoting the idea that not everyone needs to have children, the society will reach ZPG without confining the individual's freedom.

== Debate ==
=== Economic Impact ===
There were also debates about the effect of ZPG on the economy. Although temporary benefits would occur when the young workforce had fewer children to care for so that both parents could work, the technology will end up growing in a slower pace under an ZPG society than a society with a growing population of young workforce. On the other hand, the ZPGO activist, economist Stephen Enke argued that population growth rate is negatively correlated with the capital each individual can accumulate, and a growing population inclusively benefits the property owners rather than the general public.

An accelerated economic growth is often related with an growing working-age population: when the available labor force is larger than needed, they generate more resources that can be used in social investments. On the other hand, a shrinking working-age population causes skill shortage. This potentially stimulates technological automation and a wage raise, especially among skilled workers. A smaller number of available workers can lead to larger employment rates, but too much automation may also lead to job displacement.

== Mechanisms ==
In the long term, zero population growth can be achieved when the birth rate of a population equals the death rate. That is, the total fertility rate is at replacement level and birth and death rates are stable, a condition also called demographic equilibrium. Unstable rates can lead to drastic changes in population levels. This analysis is valid for the planet as a whole, but not necessarily for a region or country as it ignores migration.

Population momentum. Even when the total fertility rate of a population reaches replacement level, that population usually continues to grow because of population momentum. A population that has been growing in the past will have a higher proportion of young people. As it is younger people who have children, there is a time lag between the point at which the fertility rate, representing the average number of children born to a woman, falls to the replacement level and the point at which the population stops growing. The reason for this is that even though the fertility rate has dropped to replacement level, people already continue to live for some time within a population. Therefore, equilibrium, with a static population, will not be reached until the first "replacement level" birth cohorts reach old age and die.

Aging populations. Conversely, with fertility below replacement, the fraction of elderly grows; but since that generation failed to replace itself during its fertile years, a subsequent "population bust", or decrease in population, will occur when the older generation dies off. This effect has been termed birth dearth. In addition, if a country's fertility is at replacement level, and has been that way for at least several decades (to stabilize its age distribution), then that country's population could still experience growth due to increasing life expectancy, even though the population growth is likely to be smaller than it would be from natural population increase.

== Reaching zero population growth ==
Zero population growth is often a goal of demographic planners and environmentalists who believe that reducing population growth is essential for the health of the ecosystem. Achieving ZPG in the short run is difficult because a country's population growth is often determined by economic factors, incidence of poverty, natural disasters, disease, etc.

Albert Bartlett, a physics professor at the University of Colorado at Boulder, suggested that a population has the following choices to achieve ZPG: adopt voluntary control of childbirth and immigration; remain on the current route until the population is so large that draconian measures become necessary; or allow the nature to respond to overpopulation with disease, starvation, or war that would reduce the population.

Similarly, Jason Brent, an American writer and Municipal judge provides three means to reach zero population growth in his book Humans: Endangered Species. Those are war, diseases, starvation, and other undesirable measures; voluntary control of childbirth; and lastly, enforced population control by one or many authorities.

A loosely defined goal of ZPG is to match the replacement fertility rate, which is the average number of children per woman which would hold the population constant. This replacement fertility will depend on mortality rates and the sex ratio at birth, and varies from around 2.1 in developed countries to over 3.0 in some developing countries.

Although the public has desired ZPG as a solution to many social and environmental problems, several countries today are facing the adverse effects on economic growth and the social support system caused by a fertility rate lower than the replacement level. Now, instead of limiting the population, governments are figuring out means to encourage childbirth to avoid an overly aging population in the future. Countries that are at or near, either from above or below, ZPG include China, Japan, South Korea, Thailand, Singapore, Australia, Iceland, Germany, Portugal, and Poland.

== Zero population growth by region ==
=== Asia ===
China is the second largest country in the world by population, with a population over 1.4 billion. China reached a population plateau (zero growth) in 2022. China's population growth has slowed since the beginning of this century. This has been mostly the result of China's economic growth and increasing living standards. However, many demographers also credit China's family planning policy, formulated in the early 1970s, that encouraged late marriages, late childbearing, and the use of contraceptives, and after 1980 limited most urban couples to one child and most rural couples to two children.

According to government projections, the long-term effect of these policies will be a reduction of the working-age population to 700 million by 2050 vs 925 million in 2011, a decline of 24%. In November 2013, a relaxation of the one-child policy was announced amid unpopularity and the forecast of a reduced labor pool and support for an aging population.

South Korea has the lowest fertility rate at 0.68 for 2024. The low fertility rate was caused by the pay disparities against female workers and long workweek and competitive job market that posed pressure against childbirth and parenting.

=== Oceania ===
Three of the five fastest declining populations locate in Oceania, including Cook Islands, Marshall Islands, and North Mariana Islands. Due to the harsh living environments and natural disasters caused by climate change, people from these islands seek migration to larger nations.

=== Europe ===
Europe is facing a decline in population due to its ageing and anti-immigration trends. Countries including Iceland, Germany, Portugal, and Poland, etc are at or near ZPG.

== See also ==
- Birth dearth
- Demographic transition
- Sub-replacement fertility
- List of countries by number of births
- List of population concern organizations
- Overpopulation
- Human population planning
- Population change
- Population Matters
- Steady-state economy
- World Scientists' Warning to Humanity
- Z.P.G. – A science-fiction movie concerning the topic of zero population growth.
