= Gabelle =

Salt tax in France

The gabelle (French pronunciation: [ɡabɛl]) was a very unpopular system of state monopoly of the salt trade (and in some regions a salt tax) that was established during the mid-14th century and lasted, with brief lapses and revisions, until 1946. The term gabelle is derived from the Italian gabella (a duty), itself originating from the Arabic word qabila (قَبِلَ, "he received").

In France, the gabelle was originally an indirect tax that was applied to agricultural and industrial commodities, such as bed sheets, wheat, spices, and wine. From the 14th century onward, the gabelle was limited and solely referred to the French crown's taxation of salt.

Because the gabelle affected all French citizens (for use in cooking, for preserving food, for making cheese, and for raising livestock) and propagated extreme regional disparities in salt prices, the salt tax stood as one of the most hated and grossly unequal forms of revenue generation in the country's history. The French state also monopolized the trade in salt and forced all individuals in France over the age of eight to buy a minimum amount of salt each year.

Repealed in 1790 by the National Assembly in the midst of the French Revolution, the gabelle was reinstated by Napoleon Bonaparte in 1806. It was briefly terminated and reinstated again during the French Second Republic and ultimately abolished in 1945 following France's liberation from Nazi Germany.

== Introduction ==
In 1229, when the Albigensian Crusades were brought to a close by King Louis IX and his mother (Blanche of Castile), France gained control of the Rhône Estuary and nearby Mediterranean coast. This led to the establishment of the first French Mediterranean port city, Aigues-Mortes ("dead waters"), in 1246. Here, salt-evaporation ponds and storehouses were constructed. These saltworks were intended to finance Louis' crusading ambitions in the Middle East. The means by which this salt would enrich the royal treasury was through a special duty on salt producers, which became the origin of the gabelle.

The temporary tax under St. Louis (as he became known) was extended in 1259 by his brother Charles I, further establishing royal control over salt, in this case over the Berre saltworks near Marseilles. This salt administration would eventually encompass Peccais, Aigues-Mortes, and the region of Camargue and come to be known as the Pays de petites gabelles. On 16 March 1341, King Philip VI established the first permanent royal tax on salt in France, known as the Pays de grandes gabelles.

Repressive as a state monopoly, it was made doubly so by the government obliging every individual above the age of eight years to buy weekly a minimum quantity of salt at a fixed price. Known as the Sel de devoir, translated to "salt duty", citizens in the Pays de grandes gabelles region were forced to buy up to 7 kilograms (15lb) of salt per year.

Each province had a Greniers à sel (a salt granary) where all salt produced from that region had to be taken in order to be bought (at a fixed price) and sold (at an inflated price).

== Classification ==
When first instituted, the gabelle was levied uniformly on all the provinces in France at a rate of 1.66% on the sale price. For the greater part of its history the prices varied and resulted in large disparities between the different provinces. There were six distinct groups of provinces, which were called pays (lit. "countries"; to be understood as an obsolete word for "region"), and classified as follows:

- the Pays de grandes gabelles; this region included the Parisian Basin and the oldest provinces of the kingdom: Île-de-France, Berry, Orléanais, Touraine, Anjou, Maine, Bourbonnais, Normandy, Bourgogne (except the southeastern third), Champagne (except the county of Rethel, which retained the lower tax granted earlier), Picardy (except the area of Boulonnais and the bishopric of Cambrai). The largest of the six regions, it had not only the highest salt prices but also a mandatory salt duty for all people over eight years of age. One-third of France's population resided within this region, and paid two-thirds of all salt revenue, but only consumed one-fourth of all salt.
- the Pays de petites gabelles; this region included the provinces of Lyonnais, Provence, Roussillon, Languedoc, and Dauphiné, southeast Burgundy (the districts of Mâconnais, Bresse, Bugey, and Beaujolais), and southern Auvergne (the districts of Forez and Rouergue). This region covered southeastern France, including the Mediterranean coastline and the lower Rhône valley. The gabelle there was about half of the rate as in the pays de grandes gabelles. One-fifth of all France's population resided within this region and paid one-fourth of royal salt revenue.
- the Pays de quart-bouillon; these provinces included Avranches, Coutances, Bayeux, and Pont l'Evêque. One-fourth of all salt produced in this region went to the royal granaries.
- the Pays de salines; these provinces included Franche-Comté, Lorraine, the Trois Evêches (Metz, Toul, and Verdun) and Alsace. Unlike in the petites and grandes regions, the laws enforced here allowed private merchants to engage in retail and wholesale salt distribution rather than complete oversight by state officials. As a result, this region's salt prices were less affected by the gabelle and its people more content with its effects. People here consumed twice as much salt as the citizens of the Pays de grandes gabelles.
- the Pays rédimés; these provinces included Poitou, Limousin, Auvergne, Marche, Guyenne, Périgord, Bigorre, Pays de Foix, and Comminges. Following insurrections caused by tax measures in the early to middle 1500s, in this region, in 1549, an agreement was made that citizens there would pay a large lump sum to the king and be forever excused from salt taxes. Instead, they were only taxed at tolls when transporting salt.
- the Pays exempts; these free provinces included Brittany, Boulonnais, Calaisis, Hainault, Artois, Flanders, Cambrésis, the principalities of Sedan and Raucour, Nebouzan, Béarn, Soule, Lower Navarre, Labours, the region of Gex, Arles, the islands of Ré and Oleron and the parts of the Aunis and Poitou that were near the salines of the Atlantic. Before coming into the kingdom of France, all of the aforementioned regions made agreements with the crown that they would only do so if they were not under the jurisdiction of the gabelle.

== Smuggling ==
Because all of the Pays had extreme disparities in tax rates and salt consumption, opportunities for smuggling were rife within France. In 1784, Jacques Necker, a French statesman of Swiss birth and finance minister of Louis XVI until the French Revolution, reported that a minot of salt, which was 49 kilograms (107.8 pounds) cost only 31 sous in Brittany, but 81 in Poitou, 591 in Anjou, and 611 in Berry.

The large differences in cost between various pays clearly show the reason behind the active smuggling of salt that took place in France until the gabelle was abolished. The obvious means of smuggling salt was to buy it in a region where it was cheap and to sell it illegally in regions where it was expensive, at a higher price, but still less than the legal price. Such smugglers were called faux-sauniers, from faux ("false") and the root sau-, referring to salt. They were able to amass large fortunes and seen by French citizens as heroes against an arbitrary and oppressive tax of a common good necessary to life. In turn, the customs guards tasked with arresting the faux-sauniers were called gabelous, a term obviously derived from the gabelle they sought to uphold. They were despised by common folk as they were, without cause, able to search people and their homes to find illegal salt. The gabelous carried weapons and were known to grope women for pleasure under the false pretence of looking for salt. Women often smuggled salt under their dresses and sometimes in false buttocks (faux culs). By the end of the eighteenth century, female smuggling was so common in some areas, especially in the west, that more women were arrested than men. It has been estimated that between 1759 and 1788, out of the 4788 arrests in Laval, 2845 women and children were arrested, amounting to more than half.

Many activities other than direct smuggling were considered to be unlawful faux-saunage. Sheepherders letting their flock drink from salty ponds, traders overly salting cod during transportation, and fishing at night (fisherman with great knowledge of waterways presumed to be smuggling salt) are all attested examples. Even production of salted products could sometimes be restricted.

Under the 1640 codification of gabelle law by Jean-Baptiste Colbert, participating in faux saunage, warranted a range of harsh punishments. Merely housing a faux-saunier could lead to imprisonment, fines, and, if repeated, death. Faux-sauniers could be sentenced to up to ten years on a galley if they were caught without weapons, and to death if caught while armed. French nobles, if caught buying contraband salt, would immediately lose their status of nobility following their first offense. In 1773, along the Loire River, which separated the regions of Brittany and Anjou, with respective salt prices of 31 sous and 591 sous, over 3000 soldiers were stationed in response to the massive amounts of smuggling that took place.

== French Revolution ==
There are many reasons for the French Revolution, but the unfair taxes and financial burden imposed upon the lower-classes and peasants was a main facet of the general population's discontent. Each year, by the end of the 18th century, about 3000 citizens (men, women, and children) were being imprisoned, sent to the galleys, or put to death for crimes against the gabelle. All the while, religious persons, nobility, and high-ranking officials were often exempt from the gabelle or paid much lower taxes. In 1789, following the ascension of the National Assembly, the gabelle was voted down and abolished throughout France. In 1790 the National Assembly decided that all persons imprisoned for breaking laws pertaining to the gabelle were to be freed from prison and that all charges and convictions were to be permanently dropped. This freedom would be short lived as Napoleon reinstated the gabelle in 1804, this time without major exemptions for regions such as Brittany. The gabelle stayed part of France's legislation until abolished in 1945.

== See also ==
- History of the British salt tax in India
- List of taxes
- Salt tax
