= Aes uxorium =

Roman tax paid by those who reached adulthood without marrying,

Aes uxorium (Latin for "bronze of wives") was a tax levied in ancient Rome on those who reached adulthood without marrying. The tax aimed to encourage marriage and increase the citizen population, likely motivated by both social and economic concerns. Exemptions were granted in certain circumstances, most notably to the Vestal Virgins, who held a unique and privileged position in Roman society.

== History ==
It was first imposed by the censors in 403 BC under the Lex Papia Poppaea. It was one of the many measures against caelibes (celibates), unless they married within 100 days. Not only did they have to pay the tax, but also they could not have a hereditas or a legacy (legatum). A man, when he attained the age of sixty, and a woman, when she attained the age of fifty, were not included within certain penalties of the law. If they had not obeyed the law before attaining those respective ages, they were perpetually bound by its penalties by a senatus consultum Pernicianum. A senatus consultum Claudianum so far modified the strictness of the new rule as to give a man who married above sixty the same advantage that he would have had if had married under sixty, provided he married a woman who was under fifty; the ground of which rule was the legal notion that a woman under fifty was still capable of having children. If the woman was above fifty and the man under sixty, this was called Impar Matrimonium, and by a senatus consultum Calvitianum it was entirely without effect as to releasing from incapacity to take legata and dotes. On the death of the woman, therefore, the dos became caduca.

== See also ==
- Bachelor tax
- Ehestandshilfe
- Tax on childlessness

== Attribution ==
This article incorporates text from a free content work. Licensed under Public Domain (license statement/permission). Text taken from Aes Equestre, William Smith, D.C.L., LL.D.:, Bill Thayer. A Dictionary of Greek and Roman Antiquities, John Murray, London, 1875..
