= Ehestandshilfe =

Tax levied on unmarried people in Nazi Germany

Ehestandshilfe ("marriage assistance") was a tax levied on unmarried people in Nazi Germany as part of the Nazi state's policy of natalism, and used to contribute to the costs of the marriage loan system. This was levied at a rate of 2–5% of gross annual income on those under 55 who were liable for income tax; under a law of October 16, 1934, it was incorporated into the income tax beginning in January 1935.

== See also ==
- Aes uxorium
- Bachelor tax
- Tax on childlessness
