= Kinder, Küche, Kirche =

Expression of traditional gender roles for women

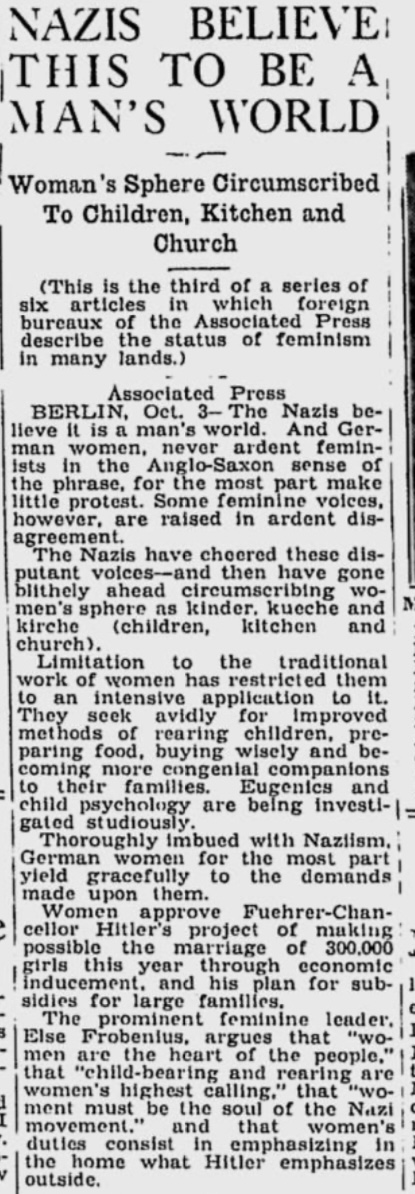
Associated Press report (As printed in the Canadian Newspaper ‘Saskatoon Star-Phoenix’ on October 1934) on the situation of womens rights in Nazi Germany

Kinder, Küche, Kirche (German pronunciation: [ˈkɪndɐ ˈkʏçə ˈkɪʁçə]), or the 3 Ks, is a German slogan translated as "children, kitchen, church" first used to describe a woman's role in society under the German Empire, and later used as Nazi propaganda during the Third Reich as a call for women to leave public life and the workforce and return to domestic duties. It now has a mostly derogatory connotation, describing what is seen as an antiquated female role model in contemporary Western society. The phrase is vaguely equivalent to the British Victorian era "A woman's place is in the home" or the phrase "Good Wife, Wise Mother" from Meiji Japan.

The origins of the phrase are normally attributed to either the last German Emperor Wilhelm II, or to his first wife, Empress Augusta Victoria. The origins of the saying were traced to a 16th-century commentary on the Book of Sirach by Johannes Mathesius.

== The origins ==
The origins of the phrase are normally attributed to either the last German Emperor Wilhelm II, or to his first wife, Empress Augusta Victoria. She is likely to have adopted it from one of several similar German "sayings by number". The most suggestive of these is listed in the second volume of German proverbs Glossary: A Treasury for the German People published in 1870 by Karl Friedrich Wilhelm Wander: "Four K's are requisite of a pious woman, namely, that she keeps regard for church, chamber, kitchen, children." Wander refers for the origins of this saying to a 16th-century commentary on the Book of Sirach by Johannes Mathesius. He also lists another similar phrase: "A good housewife has to take care of five K: chamber, kids, kitchen, cellar, clothes," which appeared first in the 1810 collection of German proverbs. by Johann Michael Sailer. In 1844 "The newspaper for the German Nobility" published this latter saying in its traditional last page "feature" short statements.

The phrase started to appear in its current form in writing in the early 1890s. "After Germany, where women apparently take no interest in public affairs, and seem to obey to the letter the young emperor's injunction 'Let women devote themselves to the three K's, – die Küche, die Kirche, die Kinder ' (kitchen, church, and children), the active interest and influence of English women on all great questions were refreshing." wrote Marie C. Remick in A Woman's Travel-notes on England in 1892. The phrase then was used multiple times throughout the 1890s in liberal writing and speeches.

In August 1899 the influential British liberal Westminster Gazette elaborated on the story, mentioning, as well, the fourth "K". A story titled "The American Lady and the Kaiser. The Empress's four K's" describes an audience given by the Kaiser to two American suffragettes. After hearing them out, the Kaiser replies: "I agree with my wife. And do you know what she says? She says that women have no business interfering with anything outside the four K's. The four K's are – Kinder, Küche, Kirche, and Kleider: Children, Kitchen, Church, and Clothing".

Kaiser's 4 K's is encountered again in Charlotte Perkins Gilman's 1911 book The man-made world. The "3 K's" variation has remained by far more popular and well known.

== Nazi Germany ==
Nazi Germany made women and mothers a priority in their political rhetoric. Many women supported the National Socialist Party because it urged returning to the family values of the past when women were encouraged to stay at home and concern themselves with taking care of the household. Barbara Kosta argues that, to some, the modern woman of the Weimar Republic was viewed as an insult to previous conceptions of Germanic motherhood, and womanhood in general.

When Adolf Hitler was appointed Chancellor in 1933, he introduced a Law for the Encouragement of Marriage, which entitled newly married couples to a loan of 1000 marks (around 9 months' average wages at that time). On their first child, they could keep 250 marks. On their second, they could keep another 250. They reclaimed all of the loan by their fourth child.

In a September 1934 speech to the National Socialist Women's Organization, Hitler argued that for the German woman her "world is her husband, her family, her children, and her home", a policy which was reinforced by the stress on "Kinder" and "Küche" in propaganda, and the bestowing of the Cross of Honor of the German Mother on women bearing four or more babies.

Concomitantly, social and legal mechanisms were set up to deflect women away from employment and into domestic life. Women's educational and professional choices were restricted, with the entire areas of law, civil service, and the upper end of medicine becoming exclusively male domains.

In one of his essays, T. S. Eliot reproduces and then comments upon a column in the Evening Standard of May 10, 1939 headed "'Back to the Kitchen' Creed Denounced":

Miss Bower of the Ministry of Transport, who moved that the association should take steps to obtain the removal of the ban (i.e. against married women Civil Servants) said it was wise to abolish an institution which embodied one of the main tenets of the Nazi creed – the relegation of women to the sphere of the kitchen, the children and the church. The report, by its abbreviation, may do less than justice to Miss Bower, but I do not think that I am unfair to the report, in finding the implication that what is Nazi is wrong, and need not be discussed on its own merits. Incidentally, the term "relegation of women" prejudices the issue. Might one suggest that the kitchen, the children and the church could be considered to have a claim upon the attention of married women? or that no normal married woman would prefer to be a wage-earner if she could help it? What is miserable is a system that makes the dual wage necessary.

During World War II in Germany, women eventually were put back in the factories because of the growing losses in the armed forces and the desperate lack of equipment on the front lines.

== Post–World War II ==
The phrase continued to be used in feminist and anti-feminist writing in the English-speaking world in the 1950s and 1960s. So, notably, the first version of the classic feminist paper by Naomi Weisstein "Psychology Constructs the Female" was titled "Kinder, Küche, Kirche as Scientific Law: Psychology Constructs the Female".

== See also ==
- Cult of Domesticity
- Good Wife, Wise Mother
- Antifeminism
- Patriarchy
- Traditional authority
- Paleoconservatism
