= Marriage promotion =

Neoliberal policy which promotes marriage

Marriage promotion is a policy aiming to produce "strong families" for the purposes of social security; as found in 21st-century American maternalism.

== United States politics ==
This promotion has its roots in the roots in the 1996 Welfare Reform Act.

Childbirth with marriage is supported along with the marriage promotion as two people can raise a baby better than an unwed mother or father. Marriage was promoted in the 1990s in order to promote family values. Rising divorce rates in the 1980s and 1990s in addition to plummeting marriage rates, however, allowed then U.S. President George W. Bush to pass a nationwide marriage promotion law in the 2000s.

One randomized controlled study reported that the most effective marriage promotion program simply provided assistance for job stability.

== See also ==
- Bachelor tax
- Marriage
- Pro-natalism
