= Marriage loan =

Loans to families by the Nazi state

Marriage loans (German: Ehestandsdarlehen, German pronunciation: [ˈeːəʃtantsˌdaʁleːən]) were part of the promotion of the family in Nazi Germany. Instituted in 1933, they were offered to newlywed couples in the form of vouchers for household goods, initially on the condition that the woman would stop working. Unless the husband's earnings were very low, interest rates on the loans continued to be lower if he was the only one working; and one quarter of the principal was forgiven for each child.

== Description ==
Marriage loans were created by the "Law for the Reduction of Unemployment" of June 1, 1933. Aryan newlyweds were eligible to receive an interest-free loan of 1,000 Reichsmarks, in the form of vouchers in the husband's name that could be redeemed for household goods such as furniture. The amount was approximately one-fifth of the average annual take-home pay; industrial workers earned 140 RM a month.

Initially, the loans required the bride to stop work immediately and not take another position during the life of the loan unless the husband was earning less than 125 RM per month. Planners hoped that the loan programme would cause 800,000 women to leave the workforce over the first four years, and there was an associated programme of subsidies for household goods manufacture intended to provide jobs for another 200,000 men. In November 1933, the Völkischer Beobachter featured as a "shining" example the mass wedding and subsequent resignations of 122 female employees of the Reemtsma cigarette factory in Berlin, who thereby freed jobs for unemployed men.

By 1937, full employment had been achieved, and women workers were needed, so the requirement was removed and the loan made available to all young people of documented Aryan ancestry and genetic fitness. This caused an increase in applications: by 1936, approximately one-third of couples were receiving them; by 1939, this had risen to 42%. In July 1938, a special marriage loan programme for agricultural workers was added as part of the Decree on the Welfare of the Rural Population: couples were eligible if one partner had worked in agriculture or forestry for five years before they married, and the loan would be excused after a further ten years of such work. There was also a renewable 400 RM subsidy for farm workers to set up a household.

Applying for the loans required demonstrating ancestral and medical "fitness", which could be onerous. However, a law of August 31, 1939, suspended the documentary requirements in anticipation of the effects of the war.

Couples who were both employed had to pay back the loan at the rate of 3% per month; if only the husband was employed, the repayment rate was 1% a month. In accordance with the Nazi policy of reversing the decline in the birth rate among Germans, one quarter of the loan was forgiven for each child, so that with the fourth child, no more was owed. This gave rise to the colloquialism abkindern (from ab, off, and Kind, child) for discharging the loan by producing offspring.

By the end of 1938, 1,121,000 marriage loans had been extended, 800,000 under the original conditions of requiring the bride to stop work, and a "baby boom" had resulted in the forgiveness of 980,000. The loan was then halved, to 500 RM. The 250 RM for each child remained a powerful incentive; other financial assistance, called Kindergeld, was also available to encourage families to have children. The loans were a particularly strong incentive to marry after extramarital pregnancy had occurred.

The loans were partially paid for by a tax on unmarried people called Ehestandshilfe ("marriage assistance"). This was levied at a rate of 2–5% of gross annual income on those under 55 who were liable for income tax; under a law of October 16, 1934, it was incorporated into the income tax beginning in January 1935.

As a result of the marriage loan programme, furniture and home furnishings were amongst the few retail trade sectors to show expansion under the Third Reich; and this did not apply to department stores, which were specifically excluded.

== Post-war counterpart ==
The East German government forgave all outstanding marriage loans in 1950, and in 1972 instituted its own loan programme, the Ehekredit (marriage credit), which was strongly reminiscent of the Nazi marriage loan: newlyweds under 26 received an interest-free loan of 5,000 East German marks, which was progressively forgiven as they had children (in this case 3), again referred to as abkindern.

== See also ==
- Tax on childlessness
