= Jus trium liberorum =

Natalist privileges awarded in the Roman Empire

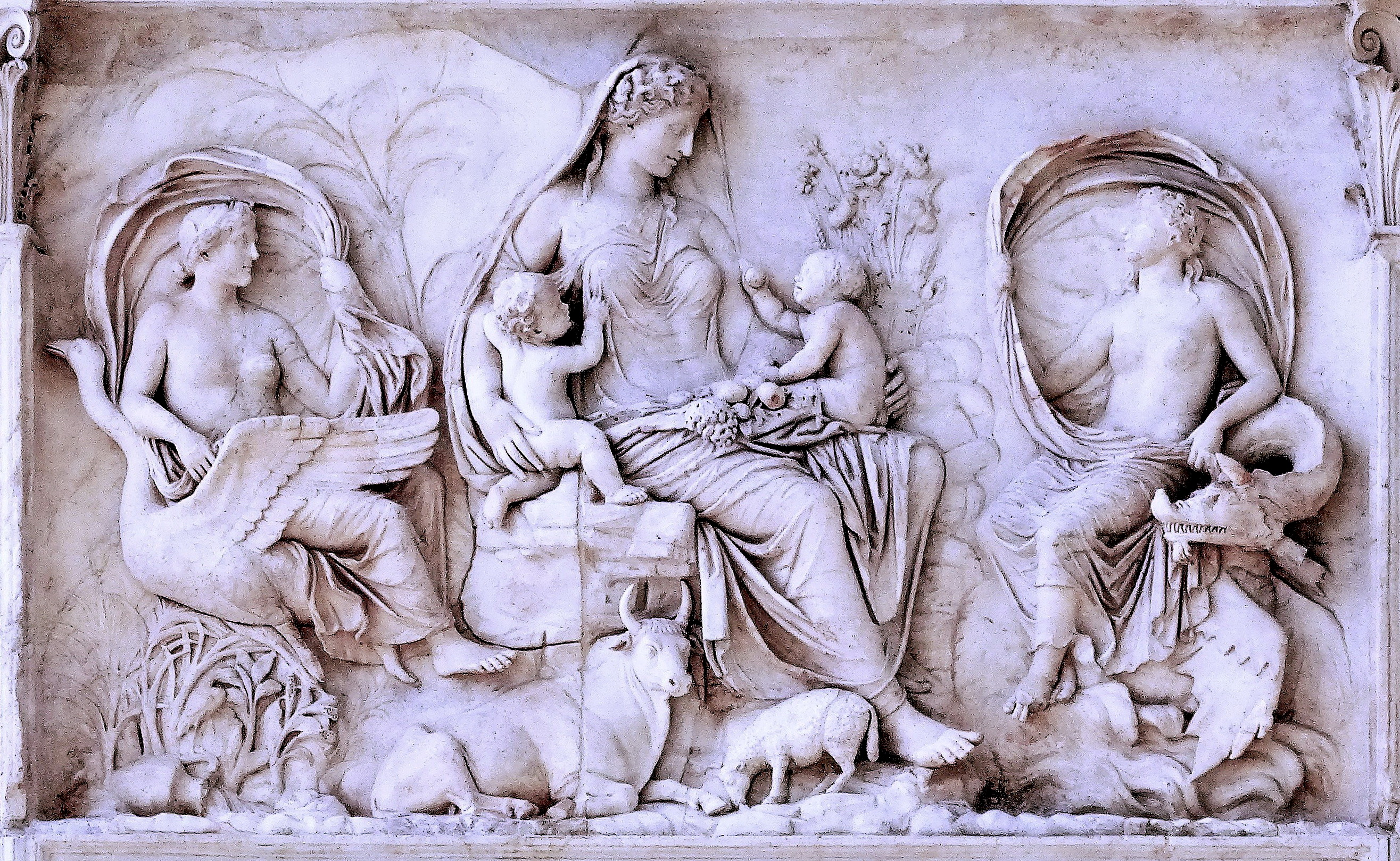
Nursing infants among images of divinities, plant life, flowing water, and animals promoting fecundity on the Ara Pacis (1st century BC), contemporary with the ius liberorum of Augustus

The jus trium liberorum (Latin, "the right of three children"; also spelled ius), was a privilege awarded to Roman citizens who had produced at least three children or to freedpersons who had produced at least four. The privilege resulted from the Lex Papia Poppaea and other legislation on morality introduced by Augustus in the first centuries BC and AD. These laws were intended to increase the dwindling population of the Roman upper classes.

The intent of the jus trium liberorum has been interpreted by a few scholars as eugenic legislation, but the predominant view is that it was intended to increase birth rates among the senatorial order. Men who had received the jus trium liberorum were excused from munera (compulsory services). Women with jus trium liberorum were no longer subject to tutela mulierum (guardianship by a male relative) and could receive inheritances which would otherwise descend to their children.

The senatorial reaction to the jus trium liberorum was largely to find loopholes, however. The prospect of having a large family was still not appealing. A person who caught a citizen in violation in this law was entitled to a portion of the inheritance involved, creating a lucrative business for professional spies. The spies became so pervasive that the reward was reduced to a quarter of its previous size. As time went on, the jus trium liberorum was granted by consuls to some citizens as rewards for general good deeds, holding important professions or as personal favors, not just prolific propagation. Eventually the jus trium liberorum was repealed in 534 AD by Justinian.

== Background ==
During the Augustan period the upper classes, the senatorial and equestrian orders, were diminishing in number. These classes formed the backbone of the state, forming the empire's civil and military administration. The classes’ populations had been affected by the recent civil wars, proscription, and most importantly, low birth rates within the classes. The decrease in birth rate was even more dramatic than is typical for the increase in Rome's development. The leges Iulia and Papia Poppaea had been able to increase marriage rates within the upper classes, but the birthrate had not increased enough through these bodies of legislation alone. For this reason the jus trium liberorum was enacted.

=== Eugenic implications ===
At the time, Italy's population as a whole was not decreasing and may have been increasing. The growth in population was largely due to the influx of slaves from outside of Italy. The jus trium liberorum, therefore, has been called a eugenic measure by scholars as it specifically worked toward increasing a specific population deemed desirable. It is argued that the aspect of population growth in the jus trium liberorum was a secondary intention.

== Legal specifics ==
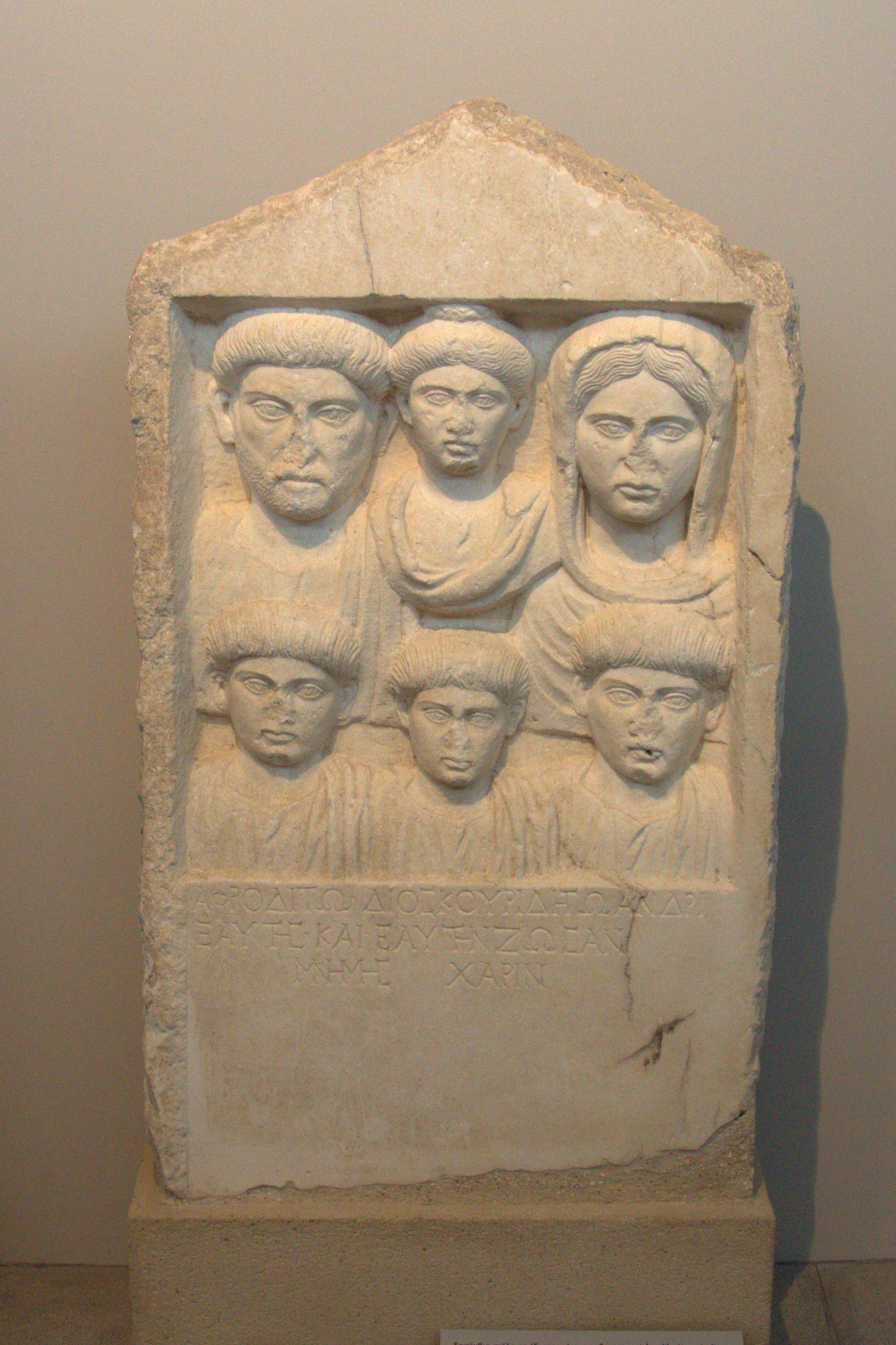
Funerary stele from Roman-era Thessaloniki (168–190 CE) depicting a woman and her deceased husband, the couple's three sons, and an older woman who is possibly their grandmother

The jus trium liberorum was a reward gained by compliance with the leges Iulia and Papia Poppea. The privilege concerned both sexes, but impacted women more than men. The specifics of the jus trium liberorum is defined as follows in Adolf Berger's Encyclopedia of Roman Law:

Fathers might claim exemption (excusatio) from public charges and from guardianship to which they were called by law (tutela legitima). The most important application of jus liberorum concerned women. A freeborn woman with three children and a freedwoman with four children (jus trium vel quattuor liberorum) were freed from guardianship to which women were subject (tutela mulierum) and had a right of succession to the inheritance of their children. The women’s jus liberorum was applied even when the children were no longer alive.

In short this meant that a man could not be forced to take over the obligation of guardianship of a woman, legally a minor, that he would otherwise be obligated under the tutela mulierum. Women who had the appropriate number of children no longer needed to have a guardian as they would under the tutela mulierum. This meant that when a woman was no longer subject to the power of her father (patria potestas) or her husband (manus) she could act independently. She also gained the right to inheritance that would have otherwise been awarded to her children. Often this meant that she inherited and owned her husband's estate upon his death. As stated above children did not need to be alive for them to count toward the jus liberorum. Legitimate children were counted for men and women. Children born to an unknown father (spurius) did count toward a woman's number of children under the jus trium liberorum. A child considered to be a portentum (literally a monster or monstrous being) was not considered to be a human but still counted toward the mother's number of children under the jus trium liberorum. Both parents could count a child deemed a portentum under the laws against childless parents in the leges Iulia and Papia Poppaea, however.

== Impact ==
After being enacted this right was considered valuable, but it soon became a privilege unconnected with three or more births to a citizen. Many people did not want the burden of children, but still sought the jus trium liberorum. This enticed many people to exploit loopholes in the law, which was often accomplished through illegal means. A reward consisting of a percentage of the inheritance involved was offered for spies who caught others illegally benefitting from the jus trium liberorum. This reward created a large number of spies due to the lucrative rewards. To reduce the problem of spies the reward was then reduced to a quarter of its previous size. The jus trium liberorum was also awarded to people in no connection with their number of offspring as a reward by the emperor. Often it was awarded in connection with a good deed, military service or as a personal favor. Many famous Romans were awarded the jus trium liberorum including Suetonius through a personal favor from Trajan to Pliny the Younger, Martial by Domitian in reward to Martial's flattery, and to Livia in response of the death of Drusus in 9 BC. Owners of large ships were also granted the jus trium liberorum under the Empire. The jus trium liberorum was eventually repealed by Justinian in 534 AD.

== See also ==
- Inheritance law in ancient Rome
- Adoption in ancient Rome

== Bibliography ==
- Berger, Adolf. "Encyclopedic Dictionary of Roman Law." Transactions of the American Philosophical Society. ns. 43.2 (1953)
- Clarke, M. L.. "Poets and Patrons at Rome." Greece & Rome. 2nd ser. 25.1 (1978): 46–54.
- Dunham, Fred S.. "The Younger Pliny, Gentleman and Citizen." The Classical Journal. 40.7 (1945): 417–426.
- Field, James A. Jr.. "The Purpose of the Lex Iulia et Papia Poppaea." The Classical Journal. 40.7 (1945)
- Tuori, Kaius. "Augustus, Legislative Power, and the Power of appearances." Fundamina 20.2 (2014): 938–945.
- Yue, Esther. "Mirror Reading and Guardians of Women in the Early Roman Empire." Journal of Theological Studies. 59.2 (2008)
