= Tax on childlessness =

Tax imposed on adults without children

A tax on childlessness is a tax imposed on childless adults, typically implemented in order to increase the birth rate and to combat population decline, often associated with pronatalist policies. Such policies have also been associated with concerns about the sustainability of pension funding.

Childlessness taxes were introduced in several countries during the twentieth century. Similar policies have also been proposed yet have not always been implemented.

== Soviet Union ==
In the Soviet Union a tax on childlessness (Russian: налог на бездетность, romanized: nalog na bezdetnost) was a natalist policy imposed starting in the 1940s. Joseph Stalin's regime created the tax in order to encourage adult people to reproduce, thus increasing the number of people and the population of the Soviet Union. The 6% income tax affected men from the age of 25 to 50, and married women from 20 to 45 years of age. The tax remained in place until the collapse of the Soviet Union, though by the end of the Soviet Union, the amount of money which could be taxed was steadily reduced.

As originally passed and enforced from 1941 to 1990, the tax affected most childless men from 25 to 50 years of age, and most childless married women from 20 to 45 years of age. The tax was 6% of the childless person's wages, but it provided certain exceptions: heroes of the Soviet Union, military personnel who had been awarded three degrees of the Order of Glory, people who could not have children due to medical reasons, and students under 25. Many single men fraudulently escaped the tax by claiming infertility and provided fake medical documentation.

From 1946, the tax was abolished for monks obliged to observe a vow of celibacy in accordance with the decision of the Council of Ministers of the USSR No. 2584 of December 3, 1946:

"Monks and nuns of Orthodox monasteries and monasteries of other faiths, obligated to a vow of celibacy, are not subject to taxation on bachelors, single and small-family citizens of the USSR".

After 1990, the income exemption was increased to 150 rubles, meaning that the first 150 rubles of income for childless adults went untaxed. In 1991, the tax was changed to no longer apply to women, and in 1992, it was rendered irrelevant and inactive due to the collapse of the Soviet Union.

== Russia ==
Russia had a lower fertility rate after the fall of the Soviet Union compared to during the Soviet era, prompting some Russian leaders to propose bringing back the tax on childlessness. According to the Health Ministry, the total fertility rate dropped from 2.19 children/woman to 1.17 children/woman in the aftermath of the Soviet Union. According to the Russian Director of the Center for Demography Anatoliy Vishnevskiy, this birth rate is among the lowest in the world, and Russian leaders have described the demographic issues in Russia as being symptomatic of a "crisis". While the tax on childlessness has not been re-enacted, other proposals have been. For example, Vladimir Putin enacted a proposal to provide cash incentives for women who are willing to have a second child.

== China ==
In 1979, China implemented a one-child policy. In October of 2015, the policy was replaced with a two-child policy. The change followed concerns of aging populations leading to a shrinking workforce.

In August 2018, a proposal was introduced to establish a maternity fund to encourage families to have more children. Under the proposal, anyone under the age of 40 with fewer than two children would be required to provide a portion of their annual income. The tax would help provide financial support to families with more children. The proposal received widespread criticism over concerns that it would financially penalize individuals who chose not to have a second child.

== Germany ==
In 2018, Germany's Minister of Health, Jens Spahn, called for a childlessness tax, arguing that those without children should pay much more toward care and pension insurance than those who have started a family.

== Hungary ==
In 1953, communist Hungary introduced taxes on childlessness which was payable by men between the ages of 20 and 50 and women between the ages of 20 and 45 who already had an income but did not yet have children. The tax covered 4% of the tax base. The tax was abolished in 1957.

== Poland ==
In 1946, communist Poland introduced a similar increase of the basic income tax rate, in effect a tax on childlessness, popularly called bykowe in Polish ("bull's tax", the "bull" being a metaphor for an unmarried man). First, childless and unmarried people over 21 years of age were affected (from January 1, 1946 until November 29, 1956), then only over 25 years of age (November 30, 1956 until January 1, 1973).

== Romania ==
Under Nicolae Ceaușescu, Communist Romania introduced pronatalist policies intended to increase the country's population. These included restrictions on abortion and additional taxes on adults without children. In December 1966, the Romanian government issued Decree No. 1086, increasing income taxes for individuals without children beginning on January 1, 1967.

The tax applied to both married and unmarried adults aged 25 or older. For workers and salaried employees, income taxes were increased by 10% to 20% depending on their earnings. Exemptions were provided for individuals whose children had died or with certain disabilities. The tax system was revised in 1977 and 1986 and remained in effect until 1989.

== See also ==
- Bachelor tax
- Child benefit
- Cost of raising a child
- Dependency ratio
- Natalism
- Population ageing
- Battle for Births
- Family in the Soviet Union
- Population planning
- Marriage loan
- Jus trium liberorum
