= Military history of Georgia =

Before the 10th-century unification of the country by the Bagrationi dynasty, several Georgian states (including Iberia and Colchis) subsisted between the Roman Empire (the Byzantine Empire after the fall of Rome's western half) on the west and the Sassanid Empire (later replaced by the Umayyad and Abbasid Caliphates) on the east. Between the 11th and 15th centuries, the Kingdom of Georgia was a major regional power which withstood invasions by the Seljuk, Mongol and Timurid Empires before its fragmentation and submission to the Ottoman and Safavid Empires. Many Georgians fought in the armies of empires that ruled the country since the 16th century, be it the Safavids (and successive Afsharids and Qajars), the Russian Empire or the Soviet Union. Since 1991, independent Georgia has taken part in a number of wars; its modern-day conflict with Russia began in 1992 (war in Abkhazia) and culminated in the 2008 Russo–Georgian War, and its alliance with the United States led to Georgia's participation in the Afghan and Iraq Wars.

== Antiquity ==
=== Kingdom of Iberia ===
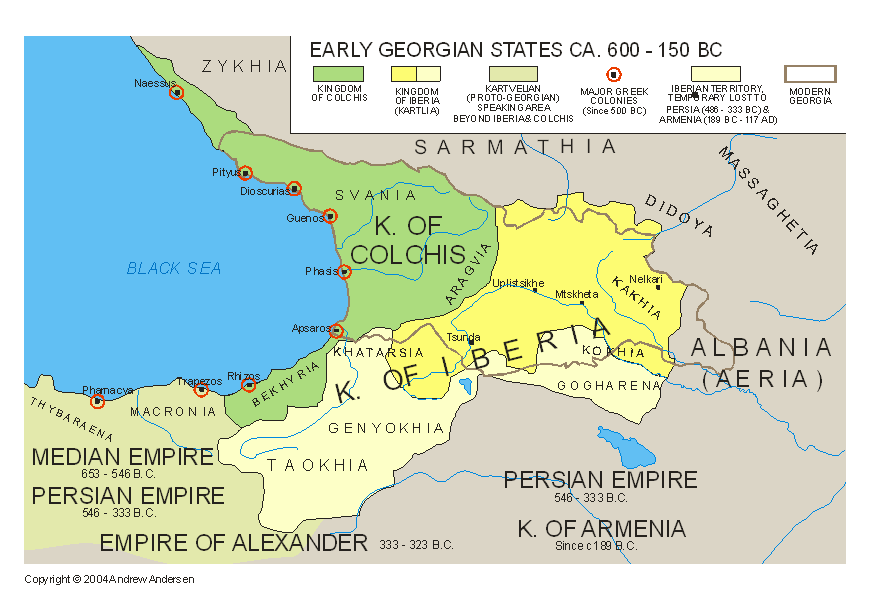
Early states in present-day Georgia, c. 600 to 150 BC

Iberia (Georgian: იბერია, Latin: Iberia and Greek: Ἰβηρία), also known as Iveria (Georgian: ივერია), was a name given by the ancient Greeks and Romans to the Georgian kingdom of Kartli (4th century BC – 5th century AD), corresponding roughly to east and south present-day Georgia. The term Caucasian Iberia (or Eastern Iberia) was used to distinguish it from the Iberian Peninsula, where present-day Spain, Portugal and Andorra are located.

The Caucasian Iberians provided a basis for later Georgian statehood and, along with Colchis (an early west Georgian state), formed the core of the present-day Georgian people.

=== Pompey's Georgian campaign ===
Pompey invaded Georgia in 65 BC after making the Kingdom of Armenia a vassal of Rome. He demanded vassalage from the Iberians, but they refused and began a partisan resistance against him. Roman troops were ambushed in forested areas, and a number of women reportedly participated in the irregular warfare. Later that year, the Iberians fought Pompey's main force across the Aragvi river near Mtskheta (the Iberian capital). Greek historian Plutarch called the engagement a great battle, noting that Iberian casualties were about 9,000; more than 10,000 were captured by the Romans. After subduing Iberia, Pompey turned towards the kingdom of Colchis and subjugated its fortresses and peoples by diplomatic and military means.

=== Kingdom of Colchis ===
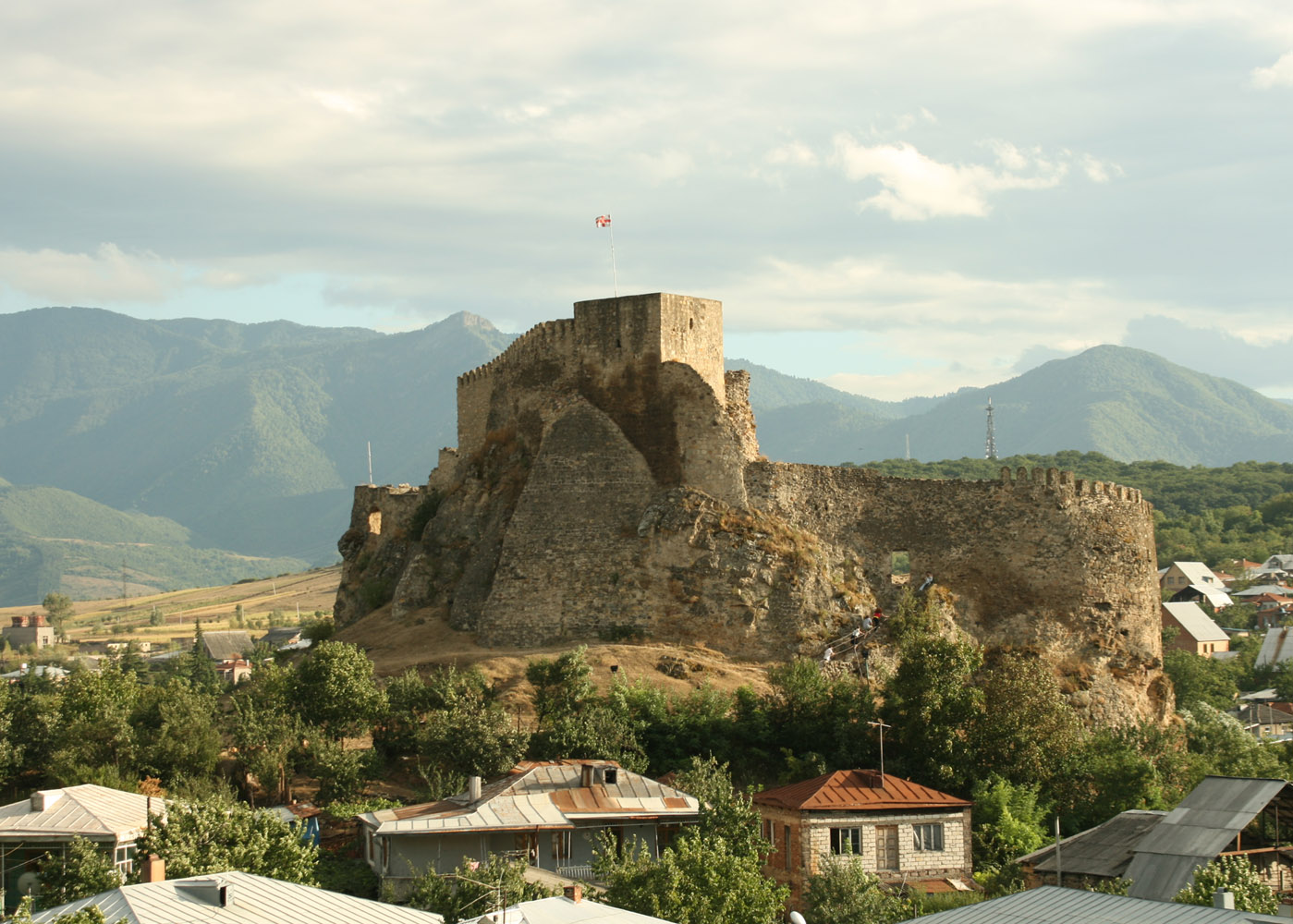
The Colchis fortress of Surami was built in the second and third centuries and heavily fortified in the 12th century.

Colchis or Kolkhis (Georgian and Laz: კოლხეთი, ḳolkheti or ḳolkha; Ancient Greek: Κολχίς, Kolkhís) was an ancient Georgian state kingdom and region in western Georgia which played an important role in the ethnic and cultural formation of the Georgian people. It covered the present-day Georgian provinces of Samegrelo, Imereti, Guria, Adjara, Abkhazia, Svaneti, Racha; the modern Turkish provinces of Rize, Trabzon and Artvin provinces (Lazistan, Tao-Klarjeti); and the modern Russian districts of Sochi and Tuapse. The Colchians were probably established on the Black Sea coast by the mid-Bronze Age.

=== War between Iberia and Armenia ===
The first-century war between Armenia and the Kingdom of Iberia is known chiefly through its description in Tacitus' Annals. Fearing usurpation by Rhadamistus, his father convinced him to declare war on his uncle and claim the Armenian throne for himself. The Iberians invaded with a large army and forced Mithridates of Armenia to retreat to the fortress of Gorneas (Garni), which was garrisoned by the Romans under the command of prefect Caelius Pollio and centurion Casperius. Rhadamistus was unable to take the fortress after an assault and a siege. Pollio, swayed by bribery from Rhadamistus, induced the Roman soldiers to threaten to surrender. As a result, Mithridates left the fortress to make peace with Rhadamistus. Rhadamistus executed Mithridates and his sons despite a promise of non-violence, and became king of Armenia. Tacitus wrote about the usurpation, "Rhadamistus might retain his ill-gotten gains, as long as he was hated and infamous; for this was more to Rome's interest than for him to have succeeded with glory." Shortly afterward, the Iberians were expelled from Armenia by a rebellion of the Armenian nobility which was supported by the Parthian Empire. Both kingdoms then take sides during the Roman–Parthian War of 58–63.

== Late antiquity ==
=== Iberian–Sasanian wars ===
Map of Georgia during late antiquity. The Byzantine and Sassanid Empires fought for control of the kingdoms of Iberia and Lazica during this period.

In 327, Georgia adopted Christianity as its state religion; this escalated tensions between Georgia and its Zoroastrian neighbor. From 483 to 522, the Georgian king Vakhtang I made it a strong regional power. The Persians referred to him as "Gorgasal" (roughly translated as "wolf") because of the wolf's-head helmet he wore into battle. Military ambitions grew during this period, reflected in a large fighting force. Refusing Persian supremacy over the region and allying with the Byzantine Empire, the Iberians faced a number of Sasanian incursions. This culminated in the defeat of the Iberians and their Armenian allies, leaving the kingdom ravaged.

=== Iberian War ===
The Iberian War was a conflict between the Eastern Roman and Sassanid Empires over the Georgian kingdom of Iberia which lasted from 526 to 532. It began after a rise of tensions between the two empires in the upper Mesopotamian and Transcaucasian regions and an anti-Persian revolt in Iberia. The war ended with the signing of the Treaty of Eternal Peace, giving the Sassanids Iberia and the Byzantines the region of Lazica. The treaty was broken with the outbreak of the Lazic War nine years later.

=== Lazic War ===
In the Treaty of Eternal Peace between the Sassanid and Byzantine Empires, the Sassanids considered Lazica a region in the Byzantine sphere of influence; the Lazic king, Tzath I, was granted baptism by Emperor Justinian I in Constantinople. Lazica became a Byzantine protectorate, which led to a full-scale uprising in 541 supported by the Persian shah Khosrow I. The Byzantine Empire lost control of the region.

This changed in 548, when the Lazic people began to revolt against Persian rule with Byzantine support. The conflict ended with a 562 status quo agreement in which the Sassanids recognized Lazica as a vassal state of the Byzantine Empire.

== Early Middle Ages ==
=== War with the Umayyad Caliphate ===
Georgia fought the Umayyad Caliphate, led by Marwan bin Muhammad, from 735 to 737. The Georgians lost the war, and the Umayyads razed several Georgian towns.

== Middle Ages ==
=== Kingdom of Georgia ===
Georgia reached its zenith of power between 1180 and 1236, becoming one of the most formidable Christian kingdoms. It had a population of about eight million (including its vassal states), and fielded 40,000 to 90,000 troops.

=== Byzantine–Georgian wars ===
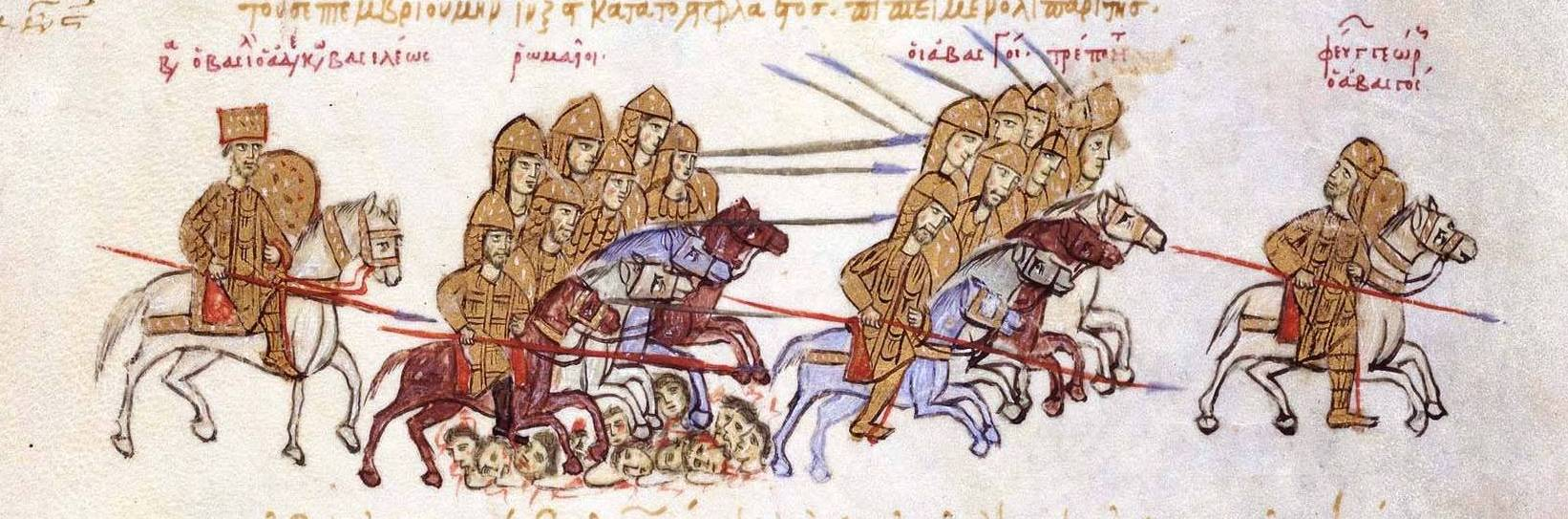
Miniature depicting the defeat of King George I of Georgia by Byzantine emperor Basil II at the Battle of Shirimni

Territorial ambitions of the Byzantine Empire and the Kingdom of Georgia caused a number of clashes between 1014 and 1208. The Byzantine Empire invaded the Kingdom of Georgia, losing the first major battle before recovering and forcing the Georgian king to surrender land after several more-costly battles. Around that time, the Georgians were also fighting off Seljuk and Arab invasions. When the Georgians regained power and resources under Queen Tamar, they reconquered their territory (including Tao-Klarjeti) and invaded Byzantium to help the Komnenos establish the Trebizond Empire.

== Georgian–Seljuk wars ==
In 1118, under David the Builder, Georgia underwent several military reforms and created a royal guard of about 5,000 horsemen. The king directed the army's training and equipment. The army faced the regional Seljuk foothold with a methodical offensive to expel the Seljuks from Georgia and the Caucasus. Over a 106-year period, the Georgians had four victories over the Seljuk Turks – in the battles of Ertsukhi (1104), Didgori (1121), Shamkori (1195) and Basiani (1205) – and slowly eliminated their dominance and presence in the region. David's army organization remained practically unchanged during the 12th century.

=== Battle of Didgori ===
The Battle of Didgori was fought between the kingdom of Georgia (about 55,600 troops) and the Seljuk Empire (over 300,000 troops) on the fields of Didgori, 40 km west of the present-day Georgian capital of Tbilisi, on 12 August 1121. The battle resulted in King David's decisive victory over the Seljuk force (under Ilghazi) and the reconquest of Muslim-held Tbilisi, which became the royal capital. The victory at Didgori began medieval Georgia's Golden Age, and was celebrated in Georgian chronicles as a "miraculous victory"; Georgians commemorate the event in an annual September festival known as Didgoroba ("[the day] of Didgori").

=== Battle of Shamkor ===
On 1 June 1195, a 35,000-strong Georgian army commanded by David Soslan (spouse of Queen Tamar) decisively defeated an army of 70,000 men led by Atabeg Abu Bakr. The battle took place in the present-day Shamkir District in Azerbaijan, and Abu Bakr was taken prisoner after his retreat to Nakhichevan.

=== Battle of Basian ===
Georgia defeated a significantly-larger Muslim coalition army of the Sultanate of Rum in the Basiani Vale, 60 km northeast of Erzurum, on 27 July 1202.

== Mongol invasions of Georgia ==
The Mongols first appeared in the Caucasus in 1220, when the Mongol generals Subutai and Jebe invaded Georgia. Their apparent defeat was a ruse; a Georgian army was sent to drive them out, but the Georgian cavalry detachments were lured into a trap and most were killed. The Mongols withdrew to pillage lands in Persia and, after resupplying, returned two months later to crush a hastily organized Georgian-Armenian army near Tbilisi. Subutai and Jebe then advanced north into Kievan Rus'.

In 1236, the Mongols launched a full-scale invasion of Georgia with the Empire of Trebizond and the Sultanate of Rum. They took the southernmost regions of Georgia in Armenia (effectively annexing the state), and the Armenian Kingdom of Cilicia and some Crusader states became vassals. Georgia enjoyed a short period of independence from the Mongols under King George V, which ended with the Timurid invasions.

=== Timurid invasions of Georgia ===
Georgia (effectively the only remaining Christian state in the Caucasus) was subjected to several disastrous invasions between 1386 and 1404 by the armies of Turco-Mongol conqueror Timur, whose empire extended at its zenith from Central Asia to Anatolia. In the first of at least seven invasions, Timur sacked Tbilisi and captured King Bagrat V in 1386. Georgian resistance prompted a renewed attack by the Turco-Mongol armies. Bagrat's son and successor, George VII, put up a stiff resistance and had to spend much of his reign (1395–1405) fighting the Timurid invasions. Timur led most of these raids; although he could not establish firm control of Georgia, the country suffered a blow from which it never recovered. George VII eventually signed a peace treaty with the Timurids, although by that time his kingdom consisted of little more than pillaged towns, ravaged countryside and a shattered monarchy.

== Turkoman invasions of Georgia ==
After Timur's death, his empire began to fragment into smaller states. One was Kara Koyunlu, which took advantage of Georgia's weakened state as a result of Timur's campaigns and began an invasion which killed King George VII. Georgia's succeeding ruler, Constantine I, allied himself with Shirvanshah Ibrahim I. Constantine was defeated and taken captive in the Battle of Chalagan, and was executed with 300 other Georgians. His successor, Alexander I, retook Lori Province from the Turkomans and encouraged the Armenian king Beskhen II Orbelian to attack them in present-day southern Armenia's Syunik Province. The victorious Alexander granted Beskhen the province as a vassal. Jahan Shah of Kara Koyunlu began two invasions of Georgia (in 1440 and 1444) due to Alexander's unwillingness to pay tribute to the shah, sacking Tbilisi and other areas.

The Kara Koyunlu were destroyed by the Aq Qoyunlu, tribal kin of the Kara Koyunlu and similar in many ways. The Aq Qoyunlu took advantage of Georgian fragmentation, and invaded several times under Prince Uzun Hasan. The Georgians allied with Ismail I, founder of the Persian Safavid dynasty, defeating the Aq Qoyunlu and ending their invasions.

== Georgian Mamluks ==
=== Georgian Mamluks in Egypt ===
During the thirteenth century, Egyptians began recruiting primarily Christians from Georgia and Circassia as slave soldiers who were known as Mamluks.

=== Georgian Mamluks in Iraq ===
Georgian Mamluks in Iraq asserted autonomy from the Ottoman Empire at the start of the eighteenth century and founded a dynasty which ruled an autonomous Iraq until 1831, when the Ottomans reimposed direct rule. Georgian Mamluk leaders of Iraq were:

- Hassan Pasha (1704–1723)
- Ahmad Pasha (1723–1747), son of Hassan
- Sulayman Abu Layla Pasha (1749–1762), son of Ahmad
- Omar Pasha (1762–1776), son of Ahmad
- Sulayman Pasha the Great (1780–1802), son of Omar
- Ali Pasha (1802–1807), son of Omar
- Sulayman Pasha the Little (1807–1813), son of Sulayman Pasha the Great
- Said Pasha (1813–1816) son of Sulayman Pasha the Great
- Dawud Pasha (1816–1831)

== Early modern period ==
=== Georgian–Ottoman wars ===
After the Mongol invasions and the collapse of the Kingdom of Georgia from the 16th to the 18th centuries, Georgia fought against Persian, Ottoman, and Russian rule of the region in the:

- Battle of Kiziki (1520)
- Battle of Teleti (1522)
- Battle of Garisi (1556)
- Battle of Digomi (1567)
- Battle of Partskhisi (1569)
- Battle of Nakhiduri (1600)
- Battle of Tashiskari (1609)
- Battle of Martqopi (1625)
- Battle of Marabda (1625)
- Battle of Bazaleti (1626)
- Battle of Khresili (1757)
- Battle of Aspindza (1770)

=== 1795 Persian invasion and fall of Tbilisi ===
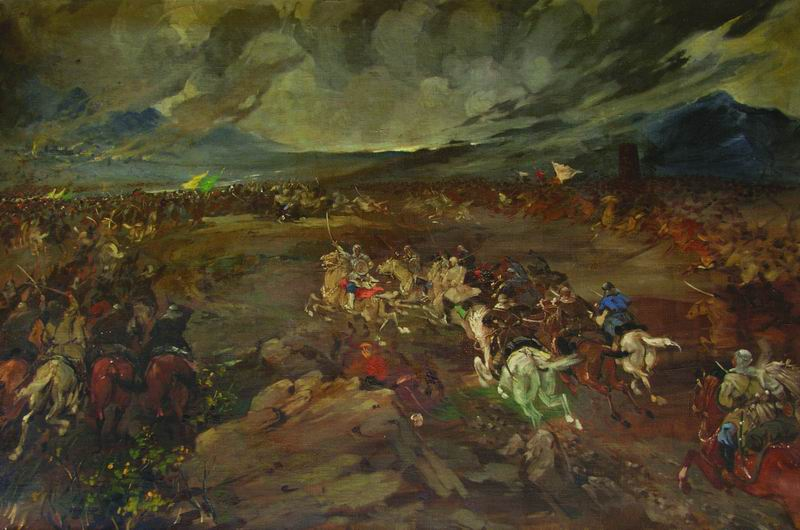
Persian forces defeated the Georgians in the 1795 Battle of Krtsanisi, capturing and destroying Tbilisi and temporarily absorbing eastern Georgia.

In response to Georgian King Heraclius II's 1783 alliance with the Russian Empire in the Treaty of Georgievsk, Iranian emperor Agha Mohammad Khan Qajar sent several ultimatums and declared war on Georgia in 1795. Amidst negotiations and too weak to stand on its own, Georgia turned to the Russian Empire and repeatedly requested military aid which was refused due to political turmoil in Europe; Heraclius appealed to Empress Catherine the Great for a few thousand troops. In August 1795, a 70,000-strong Persian army crossed the Aras river to secure vassalage of the Ganja and Erivan Khanates before reaching its destination. Khan sent Heraclius his last ultimatum, which was also rejected despite the Russian Empire's abandonment of Georgia. Khan led a 40,000-strong force towards Tbilisi to engage a Georgian army of around 5,000 troops in the Battle of Krtsanisi. Only one Georgian nobleman aided Heraclius, and about 2,000 Georgian troops were auxiliaries from the Kingdom of Imereti. Heraclius was initially successful in fending off the Qajar army, until Armenians told Khan that the Georgians were short of manpower as the Iranians were about to end their campaign. Aware of the new situation and using an artillery and cavalry duel as diversion, the Iranians outflanked the heavily outnumbered Georgians. Heraclius mounted a counterattack, but was forced to withdraw to his last defensive position; his retreat from Tbilisi to the mountains was covered by the remaining artillery and the Three Hundred Aragvians. After Khan's victory Tbilisi was sacked; most of its population was massacred in the streets, and 15,000 captives were taken to Persia. Only a thousand men from Heraclius' army survived; the Persians lost about 13,000 troops, almost one-third of their force.

=== Absorption by the Russian Empire ===
During the 19th century, taking advantage of Georgia's defeat by the Iranians, the Russian Empire began to annex individual Georgian dominions over a 50-year period until all of Georgia was absorbed by the empire. Russia violated the Treaty of Georgievsk, occupying the Georgian Kingdom of Kartl-Kakheti in 1801 and the Kingdom of Imereti in 1810. The Principality of Guria was occupied in 1829, the Principality of Svaneti in 1858, the Principality of Abkhazia in 1864 and the Principality of Mingrelia three years later. Georgia's 19th-century nobility found military service an appealing career option, and many enlisted in the Russian army or as temporary militia members. Because Georgians were considered a "martial" people by the Russian Empire, they rose quickly to positions of authority.

== 20th century ==
=== World War I ===
Georgia fought in the First World War as part of the Russian Empire. About 200,000 soldiers took part in the Imperial Russian war effort. Georgian soldiers fought for the German Empire in the first Georgian Legion. There were dozens of Georgian generals and tens of thousands of Georgians with combat experience on the Caucasus campaign and the Eastern Front by the time of the 1917 Russian Revolution.

The declaration of the Georgian independence in May 1918 led to the creation of the Regular Army of the Georgian Democratic Republic.

=== Armeno-Georgian War ===
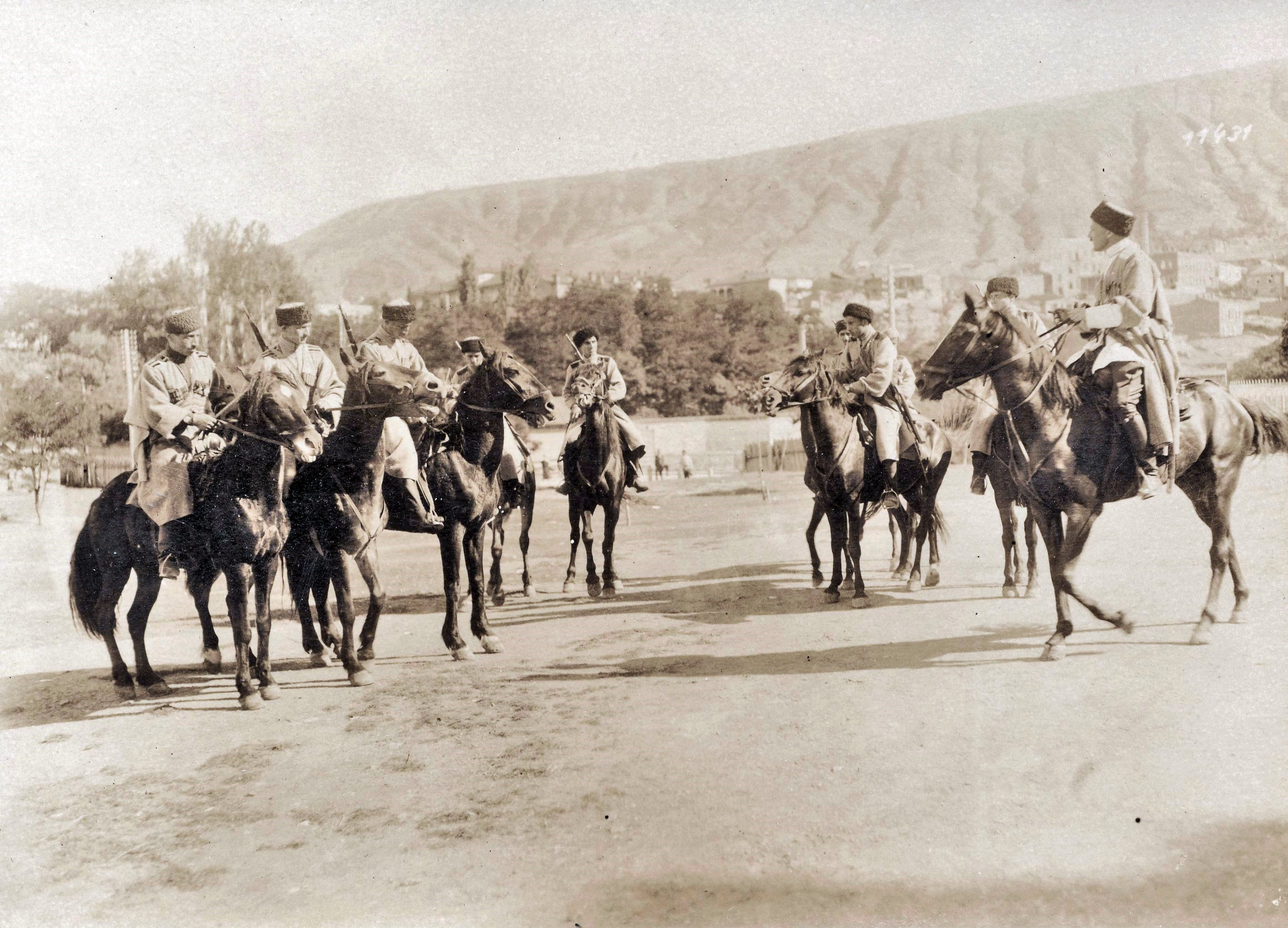
Georgian cavalry in 1918. The new Democratic Republic of Georgia was briefly involved in a border dispute with Armenia near the end of that year.

A brief war erupted between the two new Caucasus republics over the control of border regions, ending in a stalemate with little political or territorial gains on either side and hundreds (possibly thousands) of casualties.

=== Georgian-Ossetian conflict ===
In 1918, Ossetian Bolsheviks launched an insurgency against Georgian authorities to remove the Tskhinvali District from the Democratic Republic of Georgia and join Soviet Russia. Rebels formed the South Ossetian Revolutionary Committee on 23 March 1920, and captured Tskhinvali on 8 June of that year. Many opponents (including public figures) were executed, and Tskhinvali was burned. This led to a full-scale military response by the Georgian government, which crushed the rebellion. Thousands of civilians in the region became refugees, and several thousand died of disease.

=== Sochi conflict ===
A 1918 dispute about whether the region of Sochi (long under Georgian-Abkhazian rule) should be the border between Russia and Georgia sparked a conflict over control of the territory among the Democratic Republic of Georgia, the SFSR and the White movement. The Abkhazian nobility requested military aid from the Georgian government as Bolshevik forces were trying to capture Sochi. Georgia sent troops to repulse the Bolshevik incursion with the aid of the Abkhazians, resulting in the capture of all three major areas along the coast (as far as Tuapse); Sochi was secured. White movement forces were considered allies by Georgia until their announcement of a Greater Russia, with the Caucasus region an integral part. With Anton Denikin's forces pushing the Red Army back towards Tuapse, the Georgians were forced to abandon the town but kept Sochi under their control; this was protested by the White movement leadership. Denikin conducted an unsuccessful siege of the town until Georgian forces yielded to increasingly-overwhelming numbers and were driven back as far as the Georgian town of Gagra. Before the Georgians could mount a counterattack, British representatives intervened; this resulted in the establishment of a temporary demilitarized zone. After failed negotiations, joint Abkhaz-Georgian troops conducted a large-scale offensive and retook Gagra after a bloody battle which was intended to progress. The operation was halted when a British contingent arrived in Tbilisi, forcing the Georgian government to back down.

=== Red Army invasion ===
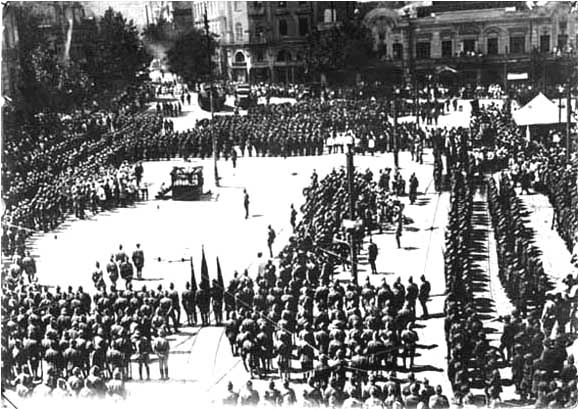
The Soviets held a military parade in Tbilisi in February 1921, shortly after its capture by the Red Army.

In 1921, Soviet Russian forces invaded and annexed the Democratic Republic of Georgia. Thousands of people, including civilians, were killed on both sides.

=== August Uprising ===
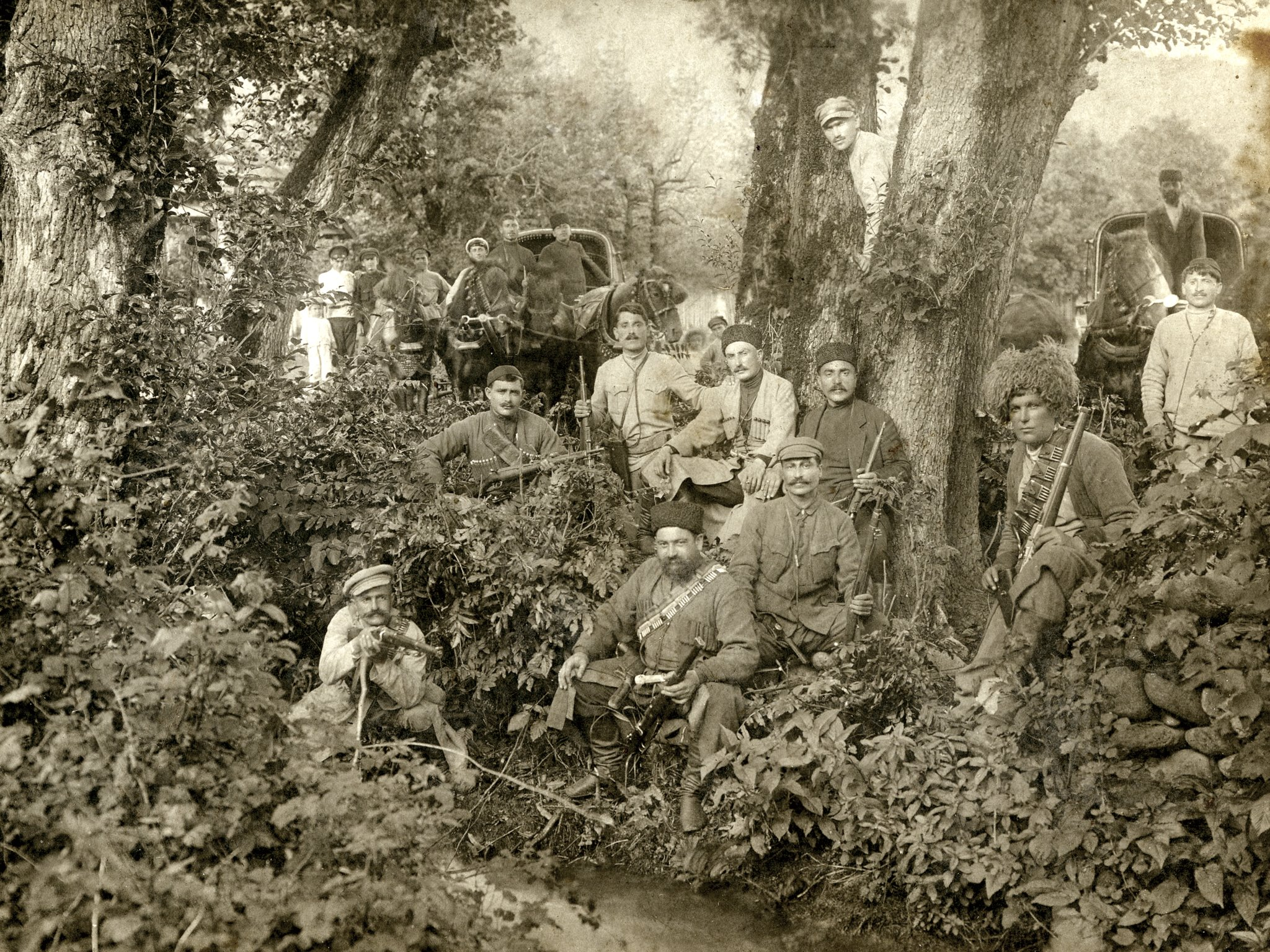
Georgian guerrillas known as Oath of Fealty, commanded by Kakutsa Cholokashvili

In 1924, thousands of Georgian freedom fighters (including Abkhazians) were killed while fighting the Soviet takeover and rule of their country. Over 10,000 people were executed.

=== World War II ===
Although the Axis powers never penetrated the Georgian SSR, Georgia contributed almost 700,000 officers and soldiers (about 20 percent of the 3.2–3.4 million citizens mobilized) to the war effort; about 300,000 were killed. One hundred thirty-seven Georgians received the Hero of the Soviet Union, the largest number of Caucasus recipients. The country was a crucial source of textiles and one of the most important manufacturers of Soviet warplanes, including the Yak-3, LA-5 and the LaGG-3.

In addition to Joseph Stalin and Lavrentiy Beria (who served for the Soviet Union), other prominent Georgian figures included Zakaria Bakradze, Valerian Tevzadze, Jerzy Tumaniszwili, Vasilij Shalvovich Kvachantiradze, Giorgi Abashvili, and Dimitri Amilakhvari. Noah Adamia, a key figure in the Siege of Sevastopol (1941–1942), was a noted sniper.

Alexander Nadiradze, later a leading Soviet missile engineer, developed anti-tank shells during the war. After being appointed chief of an OKB (a research and development bureau), he took on a variety of other projects. Nikoloz Muskhelishvili was a Soviet scientist whose theories and research in several fields contributed to Soviet development of military hardware during World War II and the Cold War.

About 30,000 volunteers, emigrants, and captured Soviet Georgian soldiers chose to fight for the Germans in units which included:

- Georgian Legion (Georgian and other regional volunteers)
- Freiwilligen-Stamm-Regiment 1 (Georgian volunteers)
- SS-Waffengruppe Georgien (Georgian volunteers)
- Bergmann Battalion (two Georgian, one Azeri and two North Caucasian companies)

Soldiers joined the Axis for a variety of reasons, and captured Soviet soldiers were forced to switch sides. The Georgian-American Alexander Kartveli designed the Republic P-47 Thunderbolt and other fighter planes.

==== Texel uprising ====
The 882nd Infantry Battalion of the Georgian Legion, commanded by Shalva Loladze, revolted against the Germans on the island of Texel in the Netherlands on 5 April 1945 in an effort to seize it and surrender to the Allies. They did not totally control the island; the reinforced Germans retook the island, rounding up and killing all but a few Georgians who were sheltered and hidden by the Dutch. Five hundred sixty-five Georgians, 117 Dutch inhabitants, and about 800 Germans died on what has been described as Europe's last World War II battlefield.

=== 1990s wars ===
==== South Ossetia war ====
The 1991–1992 South Ossetia war was a result of the Ossetians' aim to secede the South Ossetian Autonomous Oblast from Georgia during the collapse of the Soviet Union. On 20 September 1990, the South Ossetian People's Council established the South Ossetian Soviet Democratic Republic. On 10 December of that year, the Supreme Council of Georgia outlawed South Ossetian autonomy. The following day, two Georgians and an Ossetian police officer were killed during clashes between Georgians and Ossetians in Tskhinvali. On 5 January 1991, unrest in the region grew into war between Ossetian militants and the Georgian Armed Forces. The Sochi agreement was signed on 24 June 1992, ending the war. On 14 July, a Russian-Georgian-Ossetian peacekeeping force entered the Tskhinvali region.

==== Georgian Civil War ====
Georgia declared independence from the Soviet Union on 9 April 1991. The first presidential election was held on 26 May of that year, when liberation-movement leader Zviad Gamsakhurdia was elected the first-ever president of Georgia. Tensions rose as opposition to Gamsakhurdia strengthened, accusing him of establishing a dictatorship. On 19 August, Prime Minister Tengiz Sigua resigned and joined the opposition, and the National Guard of Georgia divided into supporters and opponents of Gamsakhurdia. National Guard chief Tengiz Kitovani and anti-Gamsakhurdia militants turned to the opposition on 24 August. On 21 December, police raided the demonstrations in Tbilisi demanding that Gamsakhurdia resign. That day, National Guard rebels led by Tengiz Kitovani and the Mkhedrioni paramilitary organization entered Tbilisi. The situation escalated into civil war.

==== War in Abkhazia ====
Abkhazia and South Ossetia declared independence from independent Georgia, which led to a civil war in which Russia supported the Abkhazians. The conflict between Georgia and its separatist territories remains unresolved. In 1992, Russia brokered a ceasefire agreement between the breakaway region of South Ossetia and Georgia. In 2008, Russia declared that it recognized South Ossetia as a sovereign nation along with Nicaragua, Venezuela and Nauru.

== 21st century ==
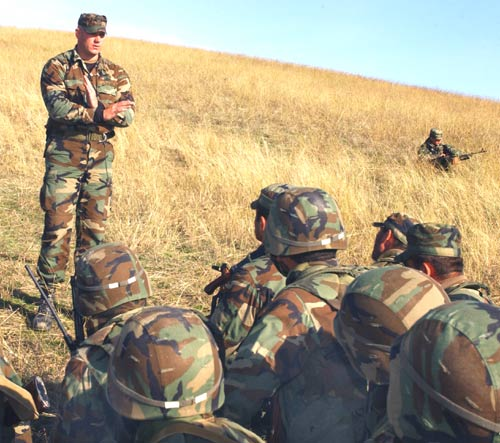
A US special forces soldier instructing Georgian army soldiers as part of the Georgia Train and Equip Program

During the 1990s conflicts, Georgia relied on an ad hoc, poorly-armed and trained militia and maintained a small force of professional troops. The situation gradually improved with growing US assistance under President Eduard Shevardnadze first and, more so, after the Rose Revolution. Georgia undertook a number of reforms to upgrade its outdated military hardware and retrain its troops in accordance with NATO standards and combat doctrines, indicative of the country's shift towards EU and the West. The number of troops increased from 15,000 to around 37,000, and the average salary increased. As a member of the Partnership for Peace since 1994 and with the Georgia Train and Equip Program, Georgian soldiers conduct joint exercises with US troops (including special forces. Since 2001, Georgia has acquired Soviet-era armament from Ukraine, the Czech Republic, and Poland. Small arms from Israel and AR-15–style rifles from the United States are primarily used for peacekeeping operations, but most of Georgia's arsenal still consists of outdated Soviet weapons.

The structure of the Georgian Land Forces is based on the NATO model, organised in accordance with the country's unique territorial and strategic situations. Light infantry, the backbone of the armed forces, is based on the United States Marine Corps' doctrine of a quickly deployable, mobile fighting force. The Georgian infantry trains and participates in joint training and deployment exercises with the US Marines. In 1999, the first NATO-based special forces were formed with financial and material assistance from Turkey. The unit began training with special forces from other partner nations, including Israel, two years later. The United States became involved later in 2003 amidst the unit's first deployment to Iraq that year.

=== Domestic industry ===
Georgia established a state weapons-research institute, later named Delta, during the early-to-mid-1990s. Beginning with the development of protective gear such as body armor and bomb-disposal suits, the institute grew with US funding. Georgia produced military equipment ranging from ammunition to aircraft during World War II, and missiles and satellite parts during the Cold War. Industry provides the Georgian army with vehicles, weapons, and most of its personnel equipment.

=== Kosovo contingent ===
Georgian troops became part of the NATO-led Kosovo Force in 1999 and remained there until 2008, with 34 initially under Turkish command and 150 under German command later in 2003. The contingent was withdrawn in April 2008 as Georgia prepared to increase its military presence in Afghanistan.

=== Involvement in Iraq War ===
The first Georgian deployment in Iraq consisted of 70 personnel: medical staff, a sapper unit and a special-forces unit stationed in Baiji as a rapid reaction force. The Georgian presence in Iraq increased to a 2008 peak at brigade strength, about 2,300 soldiers. The mission was abandoned in August 2008 due to the war with Russia, and the contingent returned to Georgia. Five soldiers died and 19 were wounded during service in Iraq.

=== 2008 war with Russia ===
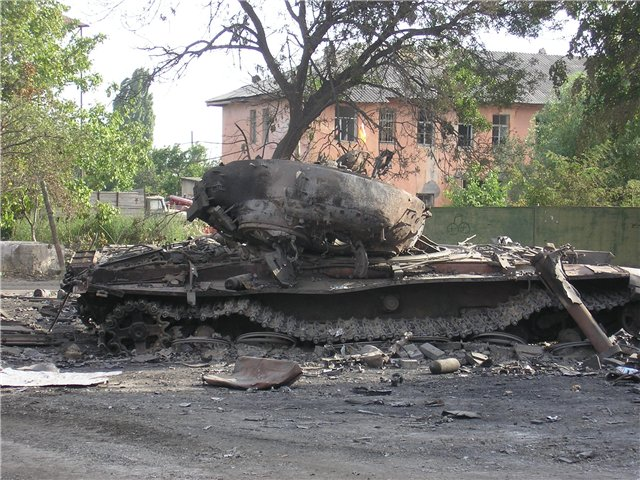
Burned-out Georgian T-72 tank in Tskhinvali during the 2008 Russo-Georgian War

In 2008, after a series of provocations and skirmishes by both sides, the Georgian government tried to restore order in the separatist region of South Ossetia by military force following attacks on Georgian villages. Russian peacekeepers became involved in the fighting, and some were killed. The Russian response resulted in a brief, large-scale conflict with hundreds of people killed, wounded and missing; tens of thousands were displaced. The Russian Federation supported the secession of both breakaway regions, contradicting its own stance on separatism. Russia occupies 20 percent of de facto Georgian territory.

=== Role in Afghanistan ===
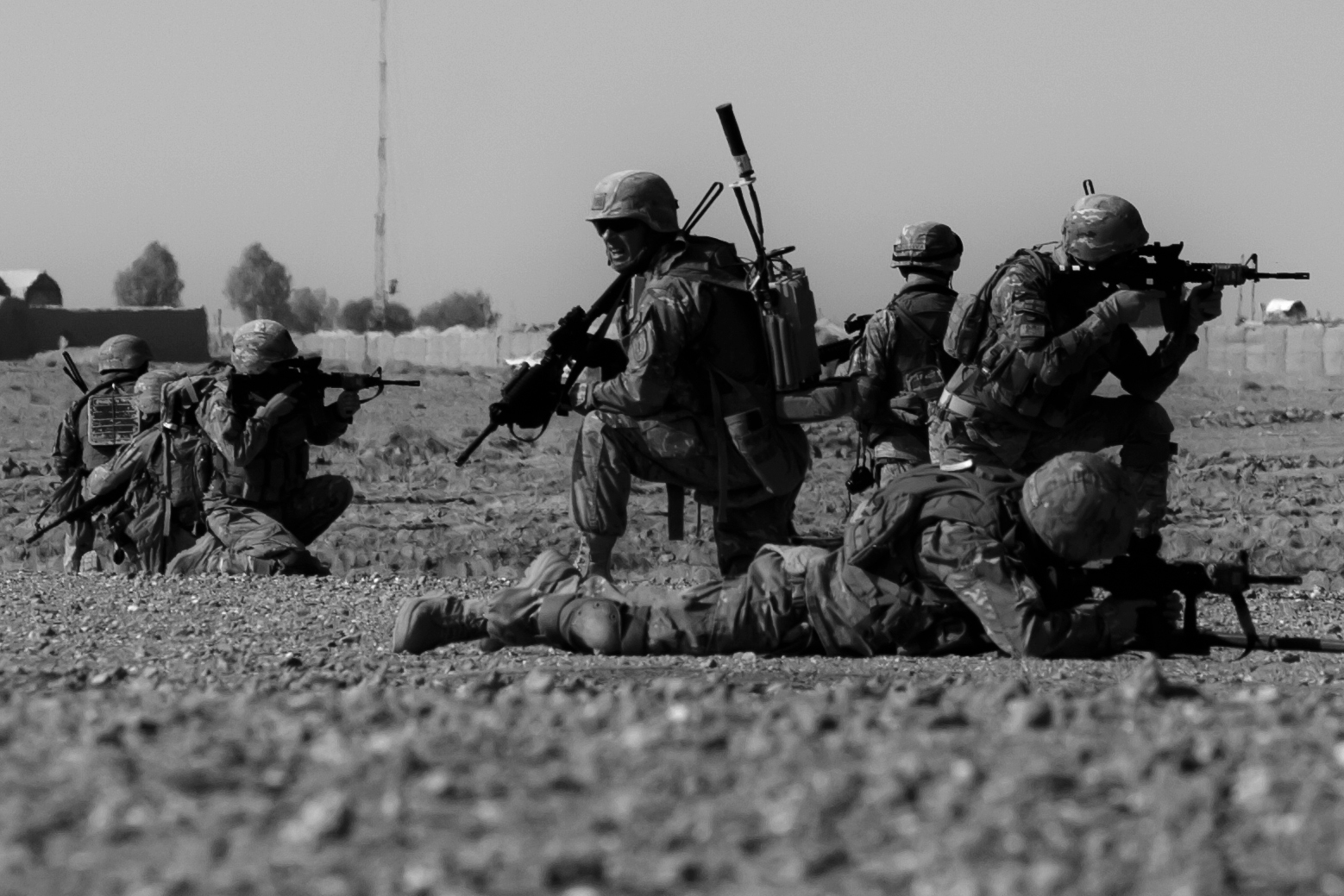
Georgian soldiers in Helmand Province as part of the ISAF, 2013

Georgia began to deploy troops in Afghanistan in 2004, reinforced by a medical group in 2007. Its military presence was increased with conventional troops in 2009 and battalions in 2010; peak deployment was over 1,500 troops in 2012. The bulk of the peacekeeping force was stationed in Helmand Province. Due to the rotational deployment of almost every infantry battalion, most Georgian soldiers have participated in an International Security Assistance Force (ISAF) deployment. Completing the operation, the Special Mountain Battalion was deployed in 2014. Thirty soldiers were killed and 435 wounded in the ISAF mission. Georgia contributed 870 troops to the Resolute Support Mission, which succeeded the ISAF.

=== Central African Republic ===
About 140 Georgian soldiers took part in the 2014 EUFOR operation to protect Bangui, the capital of the Central African Republic, providing security for humanitarian-aid convoys.
