= Kartli-Kakhetian Uprising (1625) =

1625 rebellion

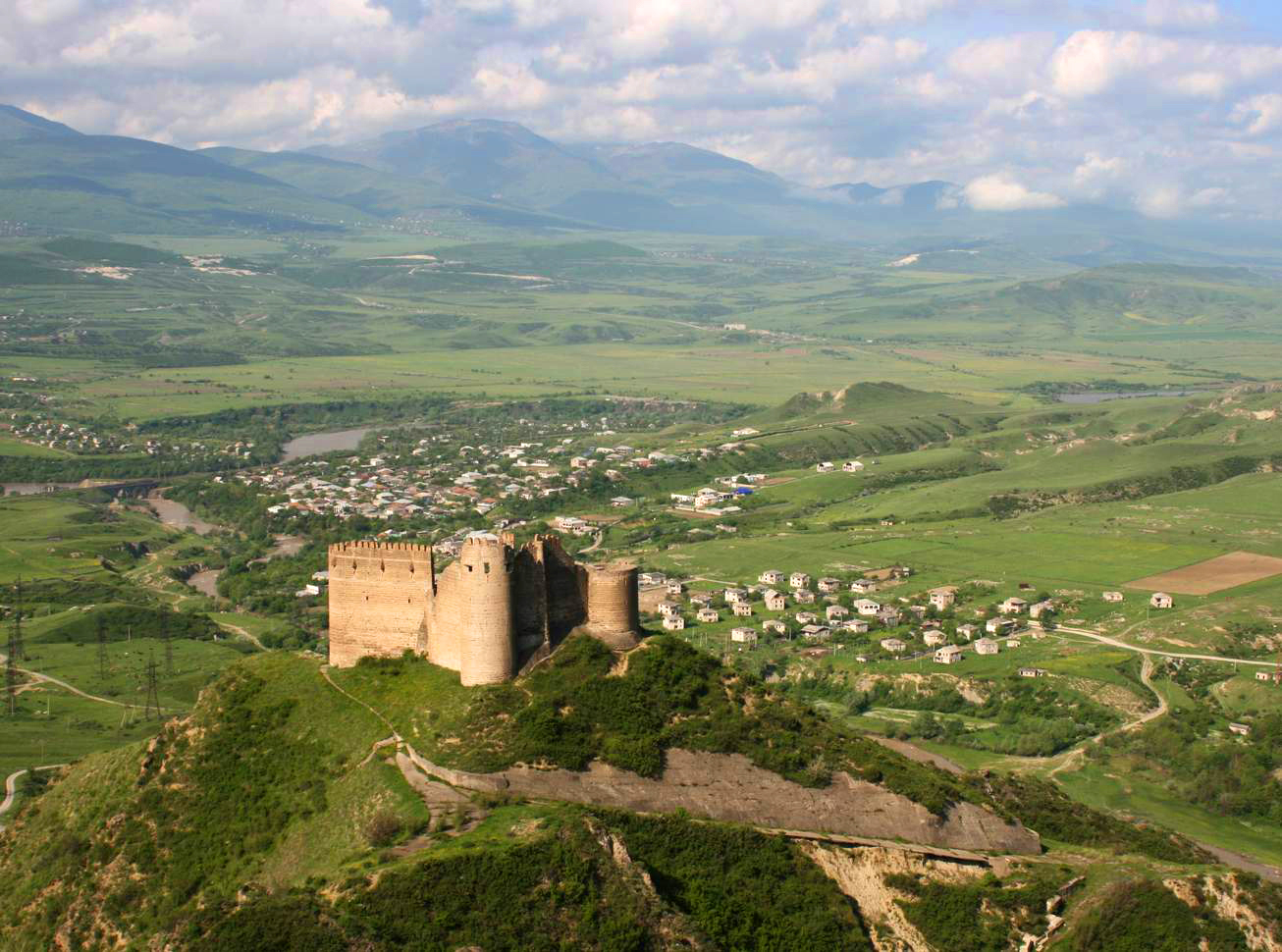
- View of the Ksani Valley, where the decisive battle took place
Date	1625
Location	Eastern Georgia
Result	Georgian victory
Territorial changes	Restoration of Georgian royal authority in Kartli and Kakheti

Belligerents
Kingdom of Kartli; Kingdom of Kakheti	Safavid Iran

Commanders and leaders
Giorgi Saakadze; Teimuraz I Zurab, Duke of Aragvi	Shah Abbas I Qarachaqay Khan †; Isa Khan Sheykhavand

Strength
Unknown	Unknown

Casualties and losses
Unknown	60,000

The Kartli-Kakhetian Uprising (1625) (Georgian: ქართლ-კახეთის აჯანყება (1625)) was a major Georgian revolt against Safavid Iran, led by Georgian political and military leaders in the kingdoms of Kartli and Kakheti. The uprising sought to end Safavid rule and restore Georgian royal authority in eastern Georgia. It ended in a Georgian victory.

== Background ==
During the early 17th century, the kingdoms of Kartli and Kakheti were under Safavid Iranian suzerainty. Shah Abbas I sought to bring eastern Georgia under closer control and reduce the power of its rulers.

In 1614, Abbas launched a military campaign against Kartli and Kakheti. King Teimuraz I of Kakheti and King Luarsab II of Kartli were forced to leave their kingdoms. A revolt broke out in Kakheti the following year but was suppressed by Safavid forces. The campaigns of 1614–1617 caused widespread destruction. Many Georgians were killed, and large numbers were deported to Iran. The Safavids also strengthened their hold over the region by appointing rulers and officials loyal to the shah.

Teimuraz I continued to resist Safavid rule. Giorgi Saakadze, a Georgian military commander who had previously served the Safavid government, also joined the opposition and helped organize the revolt. By 1625, preparations for an uprising involved supporters in both Kartli and Kakheti.

== Uprising ==
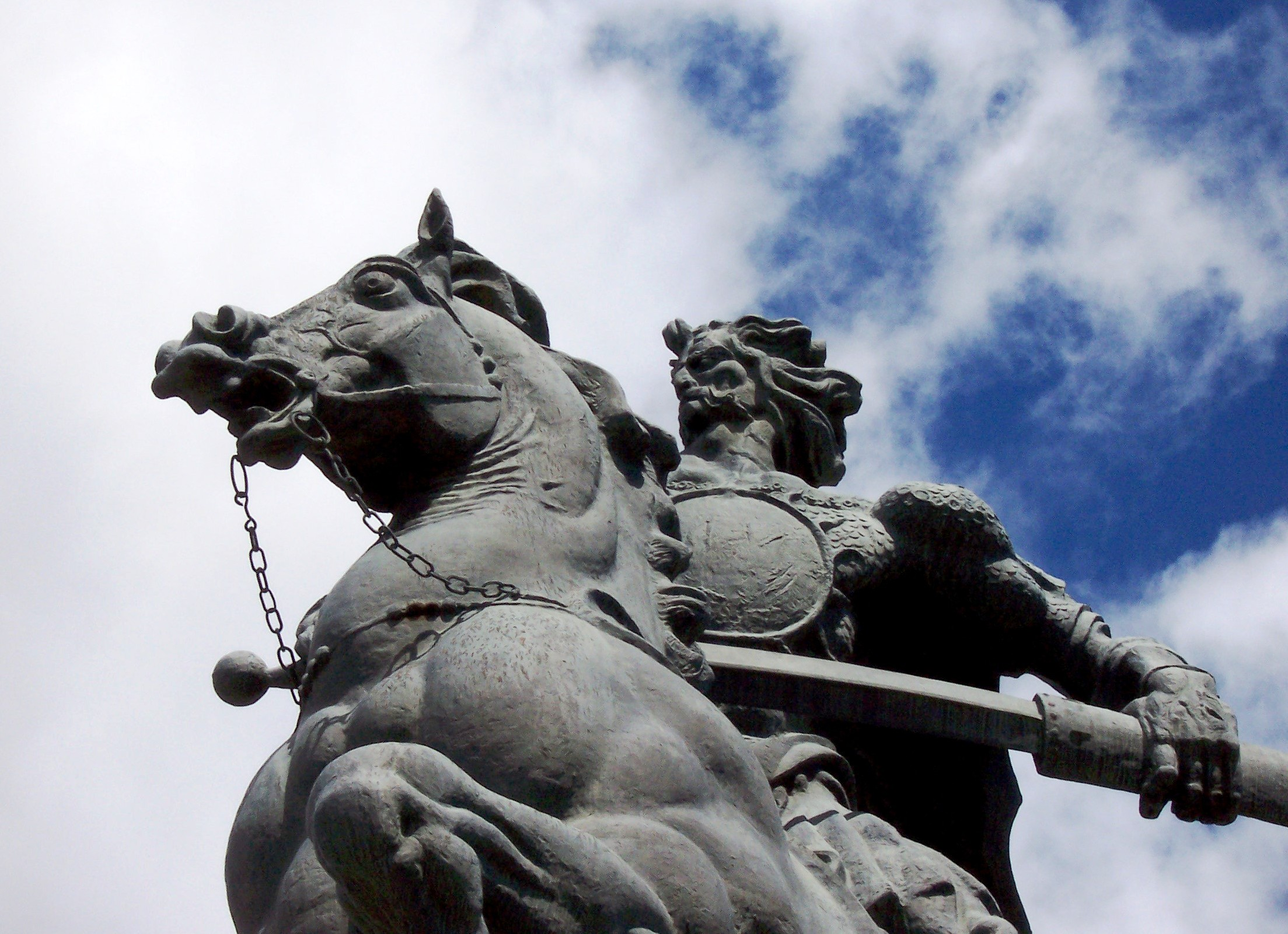
The Giorgi Saakadze statue in Kaspi, Georgia.

In 1625, Kartli and Kakheti rose against Safavid Iran. Giorgi Saakadze helped organize the revolt and gained the support of influential nobles from both kingdoms. On 25 March, Georgian forces attacked the Safavid army near Martqopi. The Persian troops were caught by surprise. Several senior commanders were killed, and the Safavid army was defeated in the Battle of Martqopi. This victory allowed the rebels to regain control of much of eastern Georgia. Saakadze then fought the Turkic nomads settled in the region by the Safavid authorities after the deportation of the Georgian population. He drove the shah's governor, Paykar Khan, out of Kakheti and led attacks on Safavid garrisons as far as Ganja and Karabakh.

After the defeat at Martqopi, Shah Abbas I sent another army to Georgia under the command of Isa Khan. The Safavid and Georgian armies met at Marabda on 1 July 1625. Despite strong resistance from the Georgian forces, the Safavids won the Battle of Marabda. However, the uprising continued. Fighting took place near Kojori on 2 July, where Georgian forces inflicted further losses on the Safavid army. Saakadze and his supporters then avoided open battles and continued the fight through guerrilla warfare.

Further fighting took place in the Ksani Valley between 2 and 5 July. The Georgians used the local terrain to their advantage and defeated the Safavid forces. Georgian historical accounts give Iranian losses in these battles as about 12,000 men. Saakadze then moved into Samtskhe, where he fought Iranian troops near Aspindza. He captured the fortresses of Atskuri and Khertvisi and drove Iranian troops out of Akhaltsikhe.

According to historical accounts, Iranian losses during the uprising reached about 60,000 men. These included 27,000 at Martqopi, 14,000 at Marabda, and 12,000 in the Ksani Valley. The heavy losses weakened Safavid control over eastern Georgia. Shah Abbas I eventually recognized Teimuraz I as king of Kartli and Kakheti.

== Aftermath ==
The uprising caused serious losses for the Safavid forces. The Ottoman historian İbrahim Peçevi wrote that "the Persians had not suffered such losses in forty years". In the same year, Sultan Murad IV sent gifts to Saakadze and congratulated him on defeating "the shah's vile brigands".

The Safavid court historian Iskandar Beg Munshi described the uprising as a "great and dangerous event". He wrote that the revolt had encouraged other subjects of the Safavid Empire to hope for liberation and that "anxiety arose everywhere".

After the uprising, relations between Saakadze and Teimuraz grew worse. Teimuraz was concerned about Saakadze's growing popularity and influence. Their rivalry led to the Battle of Bazaleti in the autumn of 1626, where Teimuraz's forces defeated Saakadze's army.

== In culture ==
The uprising became part of Georgian collective memory, inspiring numerous songs and poems, while its participants became folk heroes. The Georgian Orthodox Church later canonized the Georgian soldiers who fell at the Battle of Marabda.
