= Bazaleti =

Bazaleti may refer to:

- Bazaleti Lake, a lake in Georgia
- Bazaleti, Dusheti, a village in Dusheti Municipality, Georgia
- Bazaleti, Kharagauli, a village in Kharagauli Municipality, Georgia
- Bazaleti (historical area), a historical district in Georgia

== See also ==
- Battle of Bazaleti, a battle in Georgia in 1626
