= Georgian rebellions against Ottoman and Persian rule =

16th to 18th-century uprisings and revolts

The Georgian rebellions against Ottoman/Persian rule were a series of uprisings, revolts, and resistance by Georgian kingdoms, principalities, nobles and populations in the 16th-18th centuries against domination by the Ottoman Empire and successor Persian dynasties (Safavid dynasty, Afsharid dynasty, and Qajar dynasty). Following the collapse of the unified Kingdom of Georgia in the late 15th century and the 1555 Treaty of Amasya that partitioned the region, eastern Georgia (primarily Kartli and Kakheti) fell under Persian rule while western Georgia (Imereti, Guria, Mingrelia) fell to the Ottomans. Georgian rulers frequently rebelled against forced conversion to Islam, heavy tributes and deportations, These revolts ranged from localized noble-led uprisings to coordinated efforts by kings like Teimuraz I of Kakheti, Simon I of Kartli, and later Heraclius II of Georgia.

== Background ==
The 15th century brought dramatic changes to the geopolitical reality of Georgia, as a new powerful state the Ottoman Empire emerged in Anatolia. in 1453 they finally captured Constantinople. The Byzantine Empire was an ally of Georgia its destruction made Georgia isolated and surrounded by hostile powers from every direction. Continuous raids and incursions destroyed the Georgian economy and the separatist tendencies of individual feudal lords increased, this led to Kingdom of Georgia being dissolved in the year 1490. Western Georgia Kingdom of Imereti and principalities of Odishi, Guria and Abkhazia emerged, taking advantage of this the Aq Qoyunlu and the Qara Qoyunlu tribes raided the fragmented kingdom which granted their leaders the title of Ghazi (warrior). in the 16th century the Safavid dynasty rose to power, and Georgia was once again between two powerful enemies. The founder of the Safavid dynasty, Ismail I, led many raiding expeditions against Georgia in the 1510s, his successor Tahmasp I fought major campaigns against Georgia 1540-1554 and began extension of control over the east Caucasus. King Luarsab I of Kartli led local resistance against the Persians but died in the process.

The Persian-Ottoman struggle for the Caucasus was interrupted by the Treaty of Amasya in 1555 The treaty divided Georgia into two parts with Kartli, Kakheti and eastern Samtskhe under Persian sphere of influence while western Georgia and western Samtskhe became under Ottoman rule, King Simon I would resist Safavid rule, he would openly refuse conversion to Islam and rejected submission to the Safavid shah, he openly pursued armed resistance, making himself an adversary of Persia. Simon would lead repeated uprisings against Persian garrisons in Kartli, and he would unite Georgian nobles under a Christian banner with this move, he declared guerilla resistance. in 1569 Shah Tahmasp I would defeat Simon and imprison him, Simon during his imprisonment would be pressured to convert to Islam but he would refuse, becoming a symbol of Christian defiance. In the year 1578 the Ottoman–Safavid War (1578–1590) began, Simon was released and restored as a king, the Persians hoped He would act as an ally but Simon instead resumed resistance against both Ottomans and Persians, hoping this was his chance to restore Georgian autonomy amid imperial chaos. in the 1590s Persia regained its strength under Abbas the Great and in 1599 he was captured and would die in captivity in year 1600.

Things were different in Kakheti who preferred diplomacy over war, king Alexander of Kakheti negotiated with enemies and often accepted their supremacy, saving his realm from destruction, he was also the first king to establish relations with the Russian principalities. Western Georgia was in a disarray with local principalities feuding with each other, the ruler of samtskhe would allow the Ottomans to attack king Bagrat I of Imereti, Bagrat would launch an expedition to punish samtskhe. But local nobles would then invite the Ottomans to drive out the imeretians, and thus Bagrat was defeated and forced to return samtskhe to Ottoman control, Bagrat never fully submitted to the Ottomans and avoided Ottoman garrisons in Imereti.

In the 17th century, Persia emerged as a powerful state under Abbas the Great. Persians under his rule successfully engaged Turks in southern Transcaucasia, and would significantly increase Persian influence in Georgia, during this time a prominent Georgian military leader Giorgi Saakadze rise in Persian military ranks, Saakadze would begin his anti-Persian actions after shah Abass would order a mass deportation of Kartli-Kakheti's population, in the Battle of Martkopi the Persians would be defeated and following Martkopi Saakadze would lead a general uprising, expelling Persian garrisons out of eastern Georgia and briefly restored Georgian kingship under Teimuraz I of Kakheti, but Georgia lacked enough logistics and numbers to defeat Persia in a prolonged conflict, after the battle of Marabda ending in the defeat of Georgia, Georgian nobles began to distrust Saakadze and Teimuraz. Saakadze fled to the Ottoman Empire, where after a while the Ottoman court turned on him and executed Saakadze in 1629.

From 1632 to 1744 Georgian viceroys who were under Persian influence would introduce pro Persian policies which would grant the Qizilbash tribes settlements in Georgia, but these policies would backfire causing the Bakhtrioni uprising led by Eristavi Shalva, prince Bidzina Choloqashvili and Elzibar of Ksani, they would drive out the Qizilbash tribes out of Georgia. In the meantime the role of Georgians in Persian politics had risen with Shah Abass successors often owing their thrones to the Georgian ghulams who occupied key military and court positions.

In 1722 the Persian shah Husayn would seek help from the Georgian king Vakhtang VI, but instead Vakhtang would negotiate with Peter the Great to conduct a joint military operation against Persia, which would end in Peter abandoning Vakhtang due to logistical overstretch. The Ottomans and the Persians would take advantage of this situation and attack Georgia. The deposed king Vakhtang would flee to Russia with 1,400 men. Russia would allow the Ottomans to have all of Transcaucasia except for Dagestan and a narrow strip of shorelines in Caspian Sea, in 1728 the Ottomans divided Kartli between Georgian nobles whose constant feuding made them easy to control by the Ottomans, this period would be remembered by Georgians as "osmaloba" which would soon be replaced by "Qizilbashoba" after Nader Shah launched campaigns against the Ottomans. In 1747 Heraclius II of Georgia routed Azad Khan Afghan out near Yerevan and later captured him, in 1762 Heraclius proclaimed himself the king of the Kingdom of Kartli-Kakheti this move united all of eastern Georgia, Heraclius would join the Russians during their war against the Ottoman Empire, but the Russian general Totleben who was sent to work alongside him, would desert him. Nevertheless, Heraclius would win a decisive battle against the Ottomans known as Battle of Aspindza and with King Solomon of Imereti he would besiege Akhalkalaki.
