= Avtandil Saakadze =

- Native name: ავთანდილ სააკაძე
- Born: Before 1592; Kingdom of Kartli
- Died: 3rd of October 1629
- Cause of death: Killed by the order of Gazi Hüsrev Pasha

Avtandil Saakadze (Georgian: ავთანდილ სააკაძე; died 3 October 1629) was the eldest son and comrade-in-arms of Giorgi Saakadze.

He is first mentioned in a document alongside his father in 1607. Between 1619 and 1626, Avtandil was betrothed to Khvaramze, daughter of King George III of Imereti. In 1625, he participated in the uprising in Kartli and Kakheti and distinguished himself in the battles of Martkopi and Marabda. During the Battle of Martkopi, he killed Imamverd-beg, the son of Qarachaqay Khan. Following the Battle of Bazaleti in 1626, he accompanied his father to the Ottoman Empire. Avtandil was killed alongside his father on the orders of Gazi Hüsrev Pasha on 3 October 1629.
