= Zurab, Duke of Aragvi =

Georgian Duke of Aragvi from 1619 to 1631

Zurab

Duke of Aragvi
- Reign: 1620—1631
- Predecessor: Baadur I
- Successor: Datuna
- Died: 1631
- Spouse: 1) Anonymous wife; 2); Darejan of Kakheti (m. 1623)
- House: Sidamoni
- Father: Nugzar, Duke of Aragvi
- Religion: Georgian Orthodox Church

Zurab (Georgian: ზურაბ არაგვის ერისთავი, romanized: zurab aragvis eristavi; died 1631), was a Georgian duke (eristavi) of the Duchy of Aragvi (1620—1631), who initially served the Safavids, and played a leading role in Georgian politics in the first decades of the 17th century. Later, he joined Giorgi Saakadze's anti-Persian uprising in 1625–26, switched sides to join Teimuraz I against Saakadze, but was eventually murdered by his new ally.

== Biography ==
Zurab was amongst the highest ranking Georgian nobles at the time. He was the son of Nugzar (1600-1618) and had one older brother named Baadur. In 1619, with the help of the Safavid troops and the Safavid-appointed ruler in Tbilisi, Simon II, Zurab managed to drive his elder brother Bahadur out of Bazaleti. Receiving further aid from them, he started to conduct raids against the people of Mtiuleti and the Khevi; he managed to submit these countries, and became notoriously powerful. Through the marriage of his sister to Giorgi Saakadze, Saakadze had become the brother-in-law of Zurab. Zurab himself was the son-in-law of Teimuraz I, through his marriage to Darejan in 1623. When in 1624 Safavid Shah Abbas I (r. 1587–1629) decided to marry his granddaughter to Simon II, the Safavid ruler of Kartli, Zurab and Anduqapar Amilakhvari entertained the guests in the third term of the wedding party on the order of Giorgi Saakadze. During the Battle of Martkopi, Zurab and Giorgi Saakadze led the Georgian troops. Zurab led a charge with his main forces after Qarachaqay Khan and the other Safavid Iranian commanders had been killed by Saakadze and his son Avtandil (supported by his Georgian escorts), which resulted in the virtual annihilation of the leaderless Iranian troops. When in the summer of 1626 the final "rupture" between Teimuraz I and Giorgi Saakadze occurred, Zurab joined the side of the Teimuraz. However, in 1631 Zurab was killed on the orders of Teimuraz I, shortly after the king had instigated the duke to murder the Safavid-sponsored ruler of Kartli, Simon II. Zurab was succeeded as duke (eristavi) of Aragvi by his younger brother, Datuna.

== Sources ==
- Allen, W.E.D. (1964). "Trivia Historiae Ibericae". In Salia, Kalistrat (ed.). Bedi Kartlisa, Revue de Kartvélologie. Vol. XVII–XVIII. Paris.
- Floor, Willem; Herzig, Edmund, eds. (2015). Iran and the World in the Safavid Age. I.B.Tauris. p. 481. ISBN 978-1780769905.
- Mikaberidze, Alexander (2015). Historical Dictionary of Georgia (2 ed.). Rowman & Littlefield. pp. 133, 188, 458, 577, 600, 640. ISBN 978-1442241466.
- Rayfield, Donald (2012). Edge of Empires: A History of Georgia. London: Reaktion Books. ISBN 978-1780230306.
- Rayfield, Donald (2013). The Literature of Georgia: A History. Routledge. ISBN 978-1136825293.
- Tuite, Kevin (1994). An anthology of Georgian folk poetry. Fairleigh Dickinson University Press. p. 132. ISBN 978-0838635278.
