= Baaka Kherkheulidze =

Georgian nobleman

Baaka (Kakhaber) Kherkheulidze (Georgian: ბააკა ხერხეულიძე, romanized: baak'a kherkheulidze) was a Georgian nobleman, supporter of Giorgi Saakadze. In 1612 he informed Saakadze about the conspiracy against him and saved his life. For this Baaka's nose was cut by conspirators.

Supporters of Saakadze had strong opponents, which were led by Pharsadan Tsitsishvili and Shadiman Baratashvili. They persuaded King Luarsab II to make a conspiracy against Saakadze. Luarsab was afraid of noblemen and agreed with them. They decided to invite Saakadze for hunting and then kill him at night.

According to Ivane Javakhishvili, beside of Baaka Kherkheulidze, Giorgi's supporters where Zaal Eristavi, Teimuras Mukhranbatoni, Jesse Eristavi and Zaza Tsitsishvili.

In Tsavkisi Saakadze went only with one servant. He didn't suspect in King's treachery. On 20 May 1612 conspirators invited Saakadze in Luarsab's residence, where he should be killed, but Baaka Kherkheulidze learned about the conspiracy and informed Saakadze. For that reason, conspirators arrested Kherkheulidze and cut his nose. Baaka put himself in danger to save Giorgi Saakadze.
