= Didi Tsikhiata =

Coordinates: 42°15′04″N 43°47′29″E

Didi Tsikhiata დიდი ციხიათა
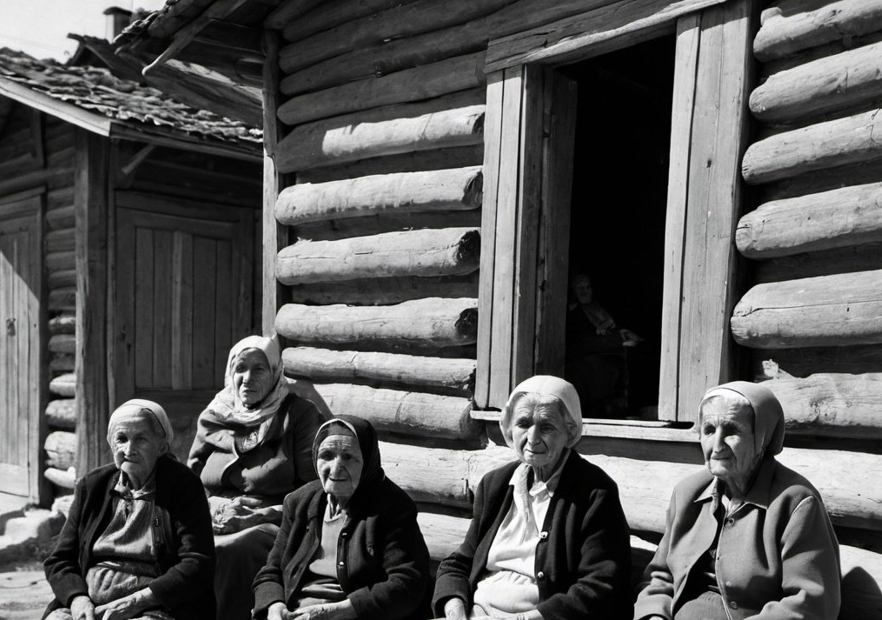
- Interactive map of Didi Tsikhiata

Population
  - Total: 47

Didi Tsikhiata is a village in Georgia, within the Tighva Municipality (Nuli administrative unit).

It is located on the eastern slope of the Likhi Range, on the bank of the Eastern Prone River, at an elevation of 960 meters above sea level, 11 km from Korna and 18 km from Tskhinvali (the nearest railway station).

From 1922 to 1990, it was part of the Znauri district of the South Ossetian Autonomous Oblast. After the abolition of the oblast, from 1990 to 2006, it was part of the Kareli district, and since 2006, it has been part of the Tighva Municipality. As a result of the conflicts in the Tskhinvali region in the 1990s, the village is not under the control of the Georgian government. Since 2008, according to Georgian law, it has been considered territory occupied by the Russian Federation.

The remains of the Kherkheulidze family tower can still be found in the village area.
