= Nine Brothers Kherkheulidze =

Nine Brothers Kherkheulidze with their Mother and Sister
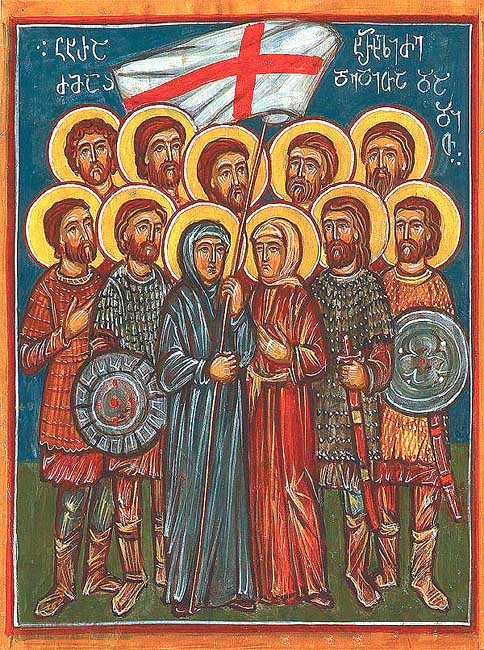
- Icon of Nine Brothers Kherkheulidze with their Mother and Sister
- Died: 1 July 1625; Marabda
- Venerated in: Eastern Orthodox Church
- Feast: 16 August [O.S. 3 August]

Nine Brothers Kherkheulidze (Georgian: ცხრა ძმა ხერხეულიძე), along with their mother and sister, were killed at the Battle of Marabda on 1 July 1625. All of them were canonized as martyrs.

== History ==
In 1625, Shah Abbas I of the Safavid Empire sent a 60,000-man army toward the eastern provinces of Georgia, Kartli and Kakheti. The force was commanded by the experienced and respected Isa Khan Safavi. Their opponent, the Georgian army, numbered only about 20,000 fighters. The Kherkheulidze brothers were chosen to protect the Georgian battle standard, the flag bearing the Cross of St. George, during the engagement.

Despite their courage and sacrifice, the Georgians lost the battle. Their commanders, as well as the bishops of Rustavi and Kharchasho, were killed in the slaughter. All nine Kherkheulidze brothers also died while carrying and defending the Georgian flag.

When the last and youngest brother fell, their sister took up the flag; after she, too, was killed, the mother of the siblings bore the flag until her own death. The Kherkheulidze brothers, along with their mother, their sister, and the other 9,000 Georgian martyrs of the Battle of Marabda, were later canonized by the Georgian Orthodox Church.

A chapel was built near the battlefield of Marabda. It is surrounded by a cemetery containing the graves of the fallen Christian soldiers.

== Gallery ==
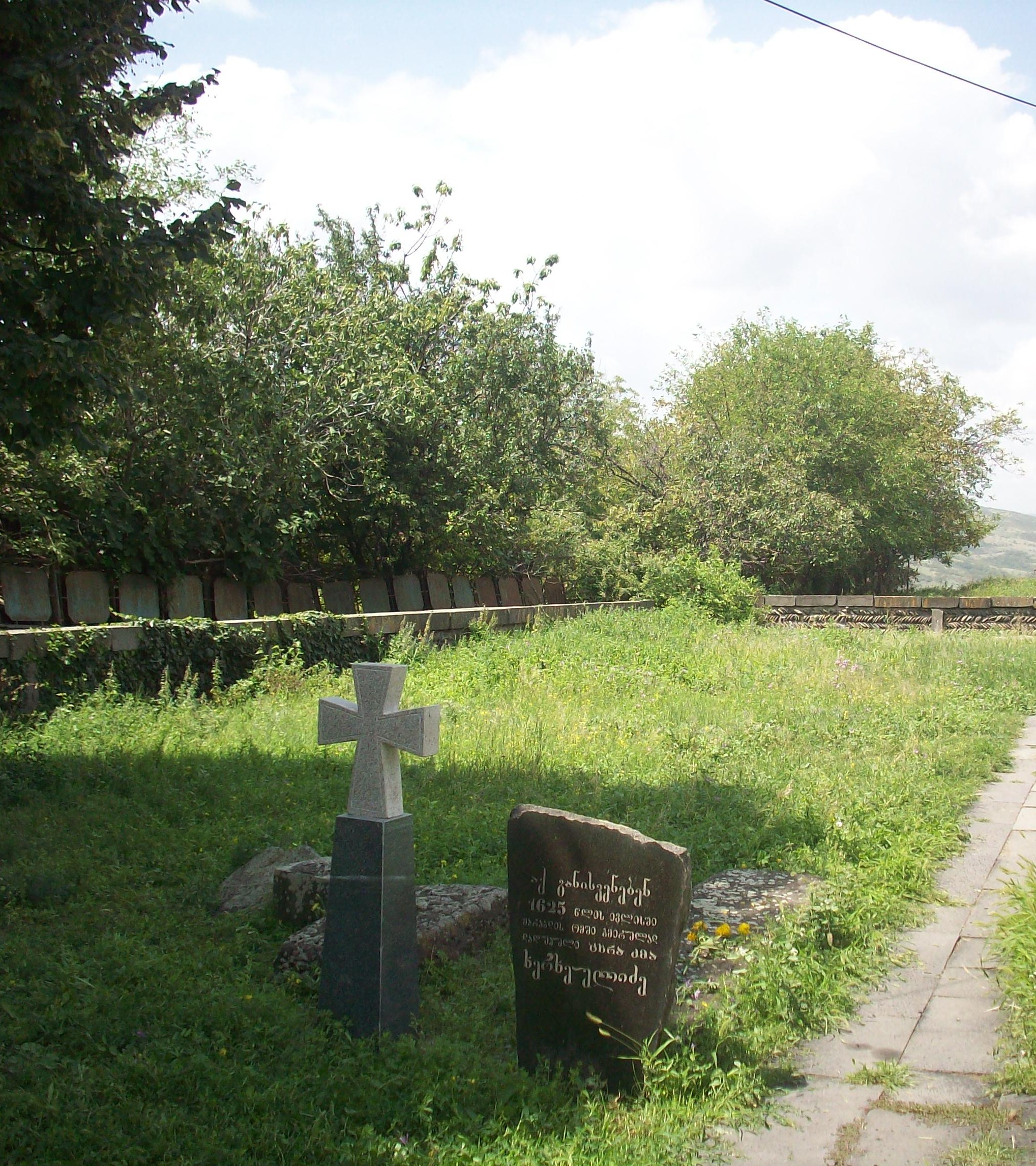
The grave of Nine Brothers Kherkheulidze with their mother and sister

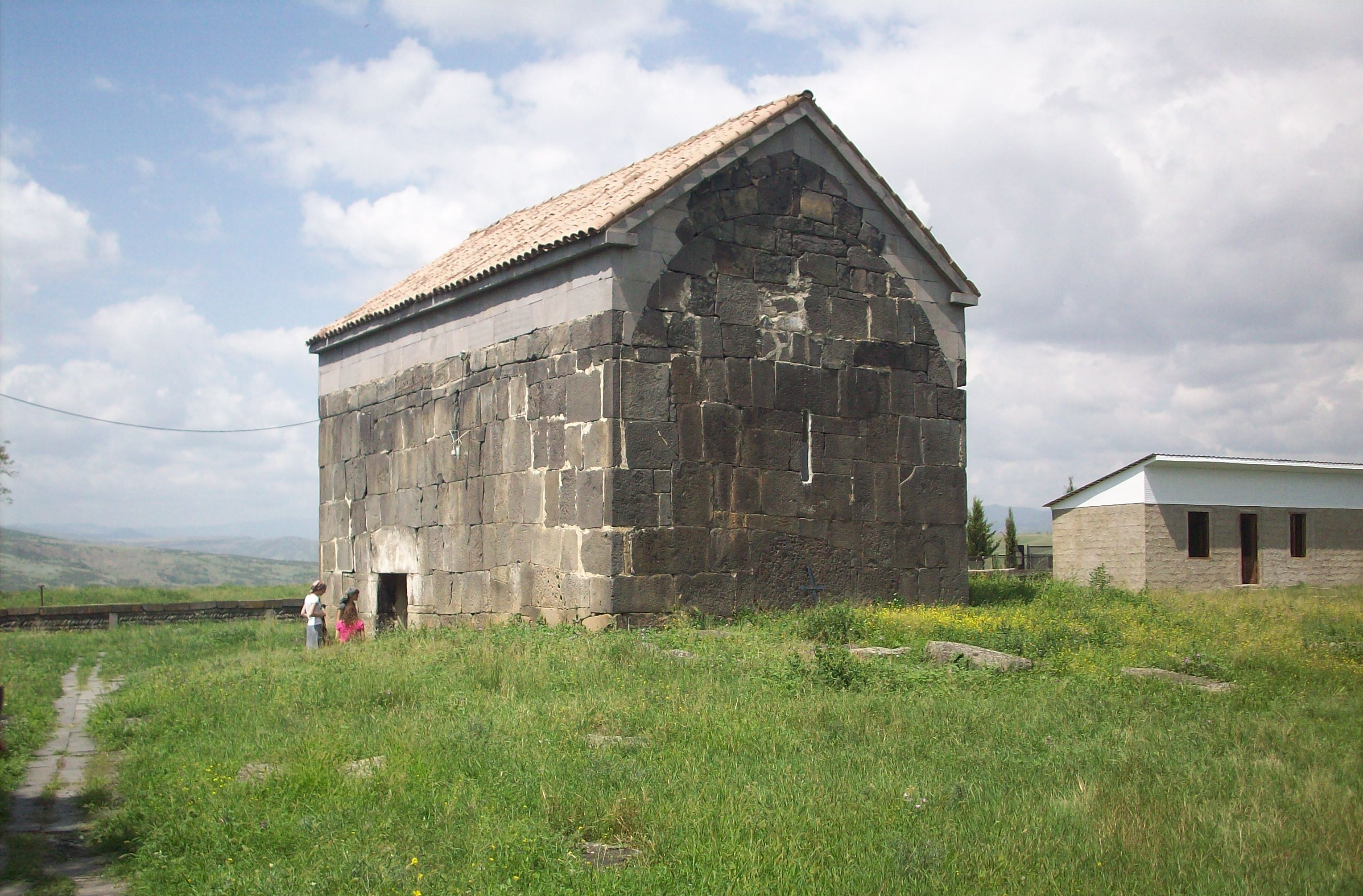
Church in Marabda, where are buried Nine Brothers Kherkheulidze with their mother and sister

== See also ==
- Kherkheulidze
- Nine Jugović brothers killed in the Battle of Kosovo
