= Nugzar, Duke of Aragvi =

Georgian duke

Nugzar

Duke of Aragvi
- Reign: 1600–1618
- Predecessor: Avtandil I
- Successor: Baadur I
- Died: c. 1618
- Spouse: Dedisimedi; Mariam Cholokashvili
- Issue Among others: Baadur I; Zurab; Datuna; Zaal; Revaz I
- House: Sidamoni
- Father: Baadur
- Religion: Georgian Orthodox Church

Nugzar (Georgian: ნუგზარ არაგვის ერისთავი, romanized: nugzar aragvis eristavi; died c. 1618) was a Georgian duke (eristavi) of the Duchy of Aragvi from 1600 to 1618.

== Biography ==
He was the nephew of the previous duke, Avtandil I. Nugzar was a boy when his uncle died, and he was still young as well when he got control over the duchy from his "illegitimate cousins". In his early years as duke, Nugzar managed to force Mtiuleti into submission. In 1578, Simon I of Kartli was released from captivity by his Safavid overlords in order to fight the Ottomans during the Ottoman–Safavid War of 1578–1590. Some months after however, he took revenge on allies of Nugzar – the eristavi of Ksani as well as the Amilakhvari family, in retaliation for their behavior during Simon I's first tenure as ruler of Kartli. In 1580, Simon I defeated Alexander II of Kakheti, whom Nugzar was dependent on, but Nugzar himself apparently managed to evade Simon I's wrath.

During David I's brief usurpation of the Kakhetian kingdom (1601–1602), Nugzar was defeated by David. Soon after however, Nugzar switched his allegiance to George X of Kartli. The latter had promised Nugzar a daughter in marriage to his eldest son, Baadur. During the Ottoman–Safavid War of 1603–1612, Safavid Shah Abbas I (r. 1588-1629) summoned George X and Nugzar, but he later sent them both back to Kartli in order to bolster their defences. In 1610, when Nugzar received his son-in-law Giorgi Saakadze, he was reportedly the master of all lands situated between the three Aragvi streams. His last appearance in the records is in 1611. Nugzar I had two sons; Baadur and Zurab (Sohrab). Baadur succeeded Nugzar as eristavi of the duchy, who in turn was succeeded by Zurab.

== Family ==
Nugzar was first married to a certain Dedisimedi and secondly to Mariam (fl. 1623), daughter of Oman Cholokashvili and sister of Nikoloz Cholokashvili. His children were:

- Baadur, Duke of Aragvi (r. 1618–1620);
- Zurab (died 1631), Duke of Aragvi (r. 1620–1631);
- George (fl. 1617–1647), whose eyes were gouged out in 1626 on the orders of his brother Zurab. He was married to Helen, daughter of Kaikhosro, Prince of Mukhrani;
- David (Datuna), Duke of Aragvi (r. 1631–1635), who was killed in Mukhrani in 1635 on the orders of Rostom of Kartli;
- Zaal (fl. 1626–d. 1660), Duke of Aragvi (r. 1635–1660);
- Revaz I (fl. 1626–d. 1679), Duke of Aragvi (r. 1670–1679);
- Ana (fl. 1618), who married Teimuraz I, Prince of Mukhrani;
- Marekh, who married Giorgi Saakadze;
- An unnamed daughter, who married Giorgi Cherkezi;
- An unnamed daughter, who married Bidzina Cholokashvili.

== Sources ==
- Allen, W.E.D. (1964). "Trivia Historiae Ibericae". In Salia, Kalistrat (ed.). Bedi Kartlisa, Revue de Kartvélologie. Vol. XVII–XVIII. Paris.
- Rayfield, Donald (2012). Edge of Empires: A History of Georgia. London: Reaktion Books. ISBN 978-1780230702.
- Mikaberidze, Alexander (2015). Historical Dictionary of Georgia (2 ed.). Rowman & Littlefield. ISBN 978-1442241466.
- Toumanoff, Cyril (1976). Manuel de Généalogie et de Chronologie pour l'histoire de la Caucasie chrétienne (Arménie, Géorgie, Albanie) [Manual of Genealogy and Chronology of Christian Caucasian History (Armenia, Georgia, Albania)] (in French). Rome: Edizioni Aquila.
