= Baadur I, Duke of Aragvi =

Baadur (Georgian: ბაადურ არაგვის ერისთავი, romanized: baadur aragvis eristavi; died c. 1624) was Duke of Aragvi from 1618 to 1620. He was the eldest son of Nugzar, Duke of Aragvi. His brother, Zurab, deprived him of the title. Baadur subsequently moved to Guria and settled in the village of Sachino, where he was killed.

== Family ==
Baadur was married to a daughter of King David XI and the half-sister of King Rostom. His children were:

- Kaikhosro (fl. 1661), who, together with his brothers Luarsab and Giorgi and his cousins Otar, Datuna, and Edisher, sons of his uncle Giorgi, conspired to kill their uncle, Zaal, Duke of Aragvi. He had one son:
  - Paata, who had one son:
    - Ioseb (fl. 1740).
- Luarsab (fl. 1661);
- Giorgi (fl. 1661);
- Rodam (fl. 1662), who married Jesse, Duke of Ksani.
