= Battle of Marabda =

1625 battle

Coordinates: 41°32′7″N 44°45′33″E

- Part of Kartli-Kakhetian Uprising (1625)
Date	30 June 1625, or 1 July 1625
Location	Near Marabda
Result	Safavid victory

Belligerents
Kingdom of Kartli	Safavid Iran

Commanders and leaders
Teimuraz I Giorgi Saakadze	Isa Khan Safavi; Rustam Khan

Strength
20,000 men	60,000 men

Casualties and losses
9,000 to 10,000	14,000

The Battle of Marabda (Georgian: მარაბდის ბრძოლა) (Persian: نبرد مارابدا) took place on 30 June 1625, or July 1, 1625, when the Iranian Safavid army defeated a Georgian force. This battle occurred after the Battle of Martqopi in the same year, when the Iranian army was routed.

== Context ==
The battle was the result of the Kartli-Kakhetian Uprising of 1625, when Teimuraz I took the leadership of the second rebellion against the Safavid Empire in his lifetime. Abbas I of Persia sent a large army under the command of Isa Khan Safavi (the qurchi-bashi) to quell the uprising, and made him the commander of the Safavid forces in Georgia. Abbas I ordered the Safavid governors in the Caucasus to assist Isa Khan. The Safavid army also included the beglarbegs of Shirvan and Erivan, as well as soldiers from northern and central Iran. Shah Abbas I was commanding the expedition from southern Azerbaijan, where he was encamped.

== Preparation ==
The Iranian army crossed into Georgian territory at the end of June 1625 and encamped in the valleys of Algeti River on plains of Marabda. King Teimuraz and Giorgi Saakadze assembled 20 thousand men and encamped in Kojori-Tabakhmela plains. The Iranians were waiting for the army of Beglarbeg of Azerbaijan, Shah Bende Khan and hence were not planning on launching an attack yet. Georgian commanders were at contention about the specifics of the strategy they would use in battle. Giorgi Saakadze was insisting on waiting for the attack of the Persians in order to utilize the landscape of the Marabda plains, whereas King Teimuraz was suggesting the opposite. In the end, the plan of Teimuraz was favored over that of Giorgi and so the battle began with the personal leadership of the king, removing Giorgi Saakadze from command.

== Battle ==
The Persians were prepared for the attack: sangars had already been built and artillery pieces were laid out in the front, behind of which stood musketeers in four rows. The front of the force was put under the leadership of Amirghuna Khan, while Isa Khan Safavi commanded the center of the army. The Georgians came down from the Tabakhmela highlands during the night and charged the Persian fortifications at dawn. The musketeers and artillery caused heavy casualties but were unable to stop the Georgian attack, which broke through the front and destroyed the Iranian vanguard, mortally wounding Amirghuna Khan. The Georgians were able to break the Persian infantry lines and launched a massive offensive on the center of Isa Khan's army. In the heat of battle, the Persian flanks were unable to help the center, got separated from the main force and, according to Teimuraz's plan, started fleeing from the battlefield. The victory of the Georgians seemed almost inevitable, but Isa-Khan and his personal guard was still stubbornly trying to halt the Georgian advance. After much of the Persian army was routed and the rest of it was reduced into a large pocket, one of the Georgian flanks lost the contact point with the enemy and started to celebrate their soon-to-be-had victory. At the same time, Teimuraz I's cavalry battalions got separated from the main battleground while chasing down the retreating Persians. The Qizilbashs used the advantage by reassembling their broken lines and concentrating them around Isa Khan's personal guard and launching a powerful counter-attack on the Georgians. Utilizing the newly arrived reinforcements under Shahbandeh Khan (the governor of the Azerbaijan Province), Isa Khan Safavi managed to break the decimated Georgian lines and rout them in the direction of Kojori Narrows.

== Conclusion ==
The defeat at Marabda was extremely costly for Georgians, killing many nobles and experienced generals in Teimuraz I's loyal service. The main reasons behind the defeat were non-disciplinary actions of the rebels and the usage of outdated weaponry. Despite the crushing defeat, Georgians continued to fight a guerrilla war against the Persians. The costly victory for the Persians at Marabda did not quell the overall uprising in Kakheti. Shortly after the defeat, the Georgian rebels managed to ambush and kill Shahbandeh Khan. Teimuraz, along with his comrades, actively continued to oppose the Persian hegemony. Teimuraz's political and military maneuvers effectively resulted in restoration of autonomy in eastern Georgia, reinstituting the throne of Kakheti to Teimuraz I himself.

== See also ==
- Nine Brothers Kherkheulidze

== Sources ==
- Blow, David (2009). Shah Abbas: The Ruthless King Who became an Iranian Legend. London, UK: I.B. Tauris & Co. Ltd. ISBN 978-1845119898. LCCN 2009464064.
