= Kherkheulidze =

Georgian noble family

Coat of arms of Princes Kherkheulidze

The House of Kherkheulidze (Georgian: ხერხეულიძე) was a Georgian noble family, originally in the southern province of Samtskhe where they held the locale called Kherkheti.

== History ==
At the end of the 12th century, one of the members of this house is said to have appointed to the Alan district of Nar where he married a local noblewoman and produced a new line of the family. Under the Russian rule, the Kherkheulidze were confirmed in the dignity of knyaz (1825, 1850, 1864).

The Kherkheulidze family was made famous by the 17th-century military commander Aghatang and his nine sons who bore the Georgian battle flag and all died at the Battle of Marabda in 1625.

== Notable members ==
- Baaka Kherkheulidze, Georgian noblewoman
- Nine Brothers Kherkheulidze
