= Battle of Tashiskari =

1609 battle

Coordinates: 41°56′50″N 43°29′22″E

Date	16 June 1609
Location	Tashiskari, Kartli
Result	Georgian victory (Note: In the summer of 1609, the Ottomans launched a sudden raid into Kartli with the goal of capturing King Luarsab. However, Saakadze quickly raised a local militia and routed the invaders at Tashiskari.)

Belligerents
Kingdom of Kartli	Ottoman Empire; Crimean Khanate

Commanders and leaders
Luarsab II; Giorgi Saakadze; Zaza Tsitsishvili	Feriz Pasha

Strength
10,000	60,000

Casualties and losses
Unknown	Heavy

The Battle of Tashiskari (Georgian: ტაშისკარის ბრძოლა) was fought between the Georgians and the Ottomans at the village of Tashiskari on June 16, 1609. The Georgians, led by Giorgi Saakadze won a victory over the Ottomans.

== Background ==
When Shah Abbas I succeeded in driving the Ottoman armies out of eastern Georgia, leaving a Persian force in Tbilisi, he confirmed Luarsab as king of Kartli. The Ottomans attempted to remove Luarsab, sending a large army of Crimean Tatars to Georgia. In June 1609, their army invaded Kartli, sacked and looted several villages, captured part of the population and quickly approached Manglis. The Ottomans tried to cut the village from here To Tskhireti (Shida Kartli), where King Luarsab II lived. Teudore Keteli tricked the enemy and took him in another direction for which he was tortured and beheaded.

== Battle ==
In the meantime, the Georgians gathered an army and under the command of Giorgi Saakadze and Zaza Tsitsishvili, at the village of Nyabi (now Kaspi municipality), at the Shcherti swamp, they turned back the enemy. Returning to Gori, they found a bridge over Mtkvari river. Then they turned towards Akhaltsikhe. near the village Brbona river. They crossed Mtkvari and camped near the village of Tashiskar (now Khashuri Municipality). The army of Georgians crossed the river Mtkvari near the village of Akhaldaba (present-day Borjomi municipality) and cut off the opponent's way to Akhaltsikhe. At the military meeting, Giorgi Saakadze's plan was accepted and he was assigned the command. The Georgian army suddenly attacked the enemy at dawn and almost completely destroyed them, only a small part managed to escape. Georgians were left with a lot of booty and prisoners. Giorgi Saakadze especially distinguished himself in this battle.

== Sources ==
- Mikaberidze, Alexander, ed. (2015). "Saakadze, Giorgi (ca.1570-1629)". Historical Dictionary of Georgia. Rowman & Littlefield.
- Rayfield, Donald (2012). Edge of Empires, a History of Georgia. London: Reaktion Books. ISBN 978-1-78023-070-2.
- Lortkipanidze, Mariam; Japaridze, Otar; Muskhelishvili, David; Metreveli, Roin (2012). History of Georgia in four volumes, vol. II - History of Georgia from the 13th century to the 19th century. Tbilisi: National Academy of Sciences of Georgia. ISBN 978-9941-19-407-8.
