= Bazaleti Lake =

Lake in Georgia

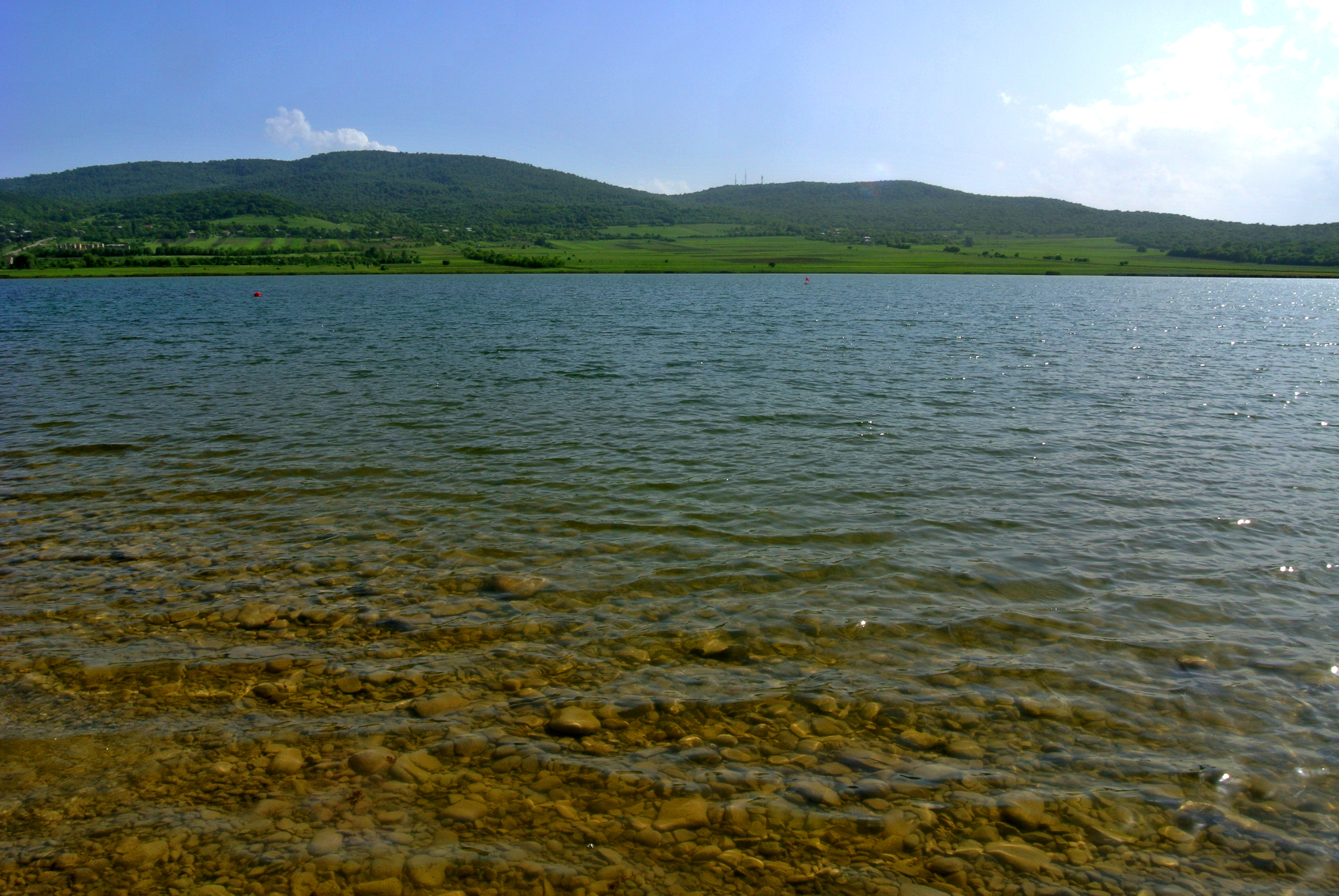

- Location within Georgia Location within Mtskheta-Mtianeti
- Coordinates: 42.039°N 44.678°E
- Basin countries: Georgia
- Surface area: 1.22 km^{2} (0.47 sq mi)
- Max. depth: 30 m (98 ft)

The Bazaleti Lake (Georgian: ბაზალეთის ტბა) is a lake in eastern Georgia some 60 km northwest of the nation's capital Tbilisi and 5 km south of the town of Dusheti. The surface area of the lake is 1.22 km^{2}. and its maximum depth is 30 m. It is known that Bazaleti lake has an outflow but it has not been discovered. Lake is used for fish culture, irrigation and recreation.

== History ==
The nearby village and the historical district around the lake are also known as Bazaleti. In 1626, the Battle of Bazaleti between two rival Georgian factions took place there. The area around the lake housed a flourishing medieval town and is surrounded by many legends. According to local legend, a golden-lips child is lying in a golden crib on the bottom of the lake. The lake was formed from his mother's tears. The story is retold in a Georgian poem. Locals claim that the water in the lake recirculates. They tell a story about a bull which was drowned in the lake and was later found in a well in the nearby village.

Currently, the area is a popular recreational area served by a modern tourist complex.
