= Tabakhmela =

Coordinates: 41°39′11″N 44°45′29″E

Tabakhmela (Georgian: ტაბახმელა) (Dry Lake - Tba-Lake, Khmeli-dry) is a village in the Kartli region, overlooking the city of Tbilisi, Georgia. The village is also home to several traditional religious festivals throughout a year, particularly Tamaroba (local celebration of St. King Tamaras day, May 14).

In 1921, the area was the scene of heavy fighting during the Battle for Tbilisi as part of the Red Army invasion of Georgia.

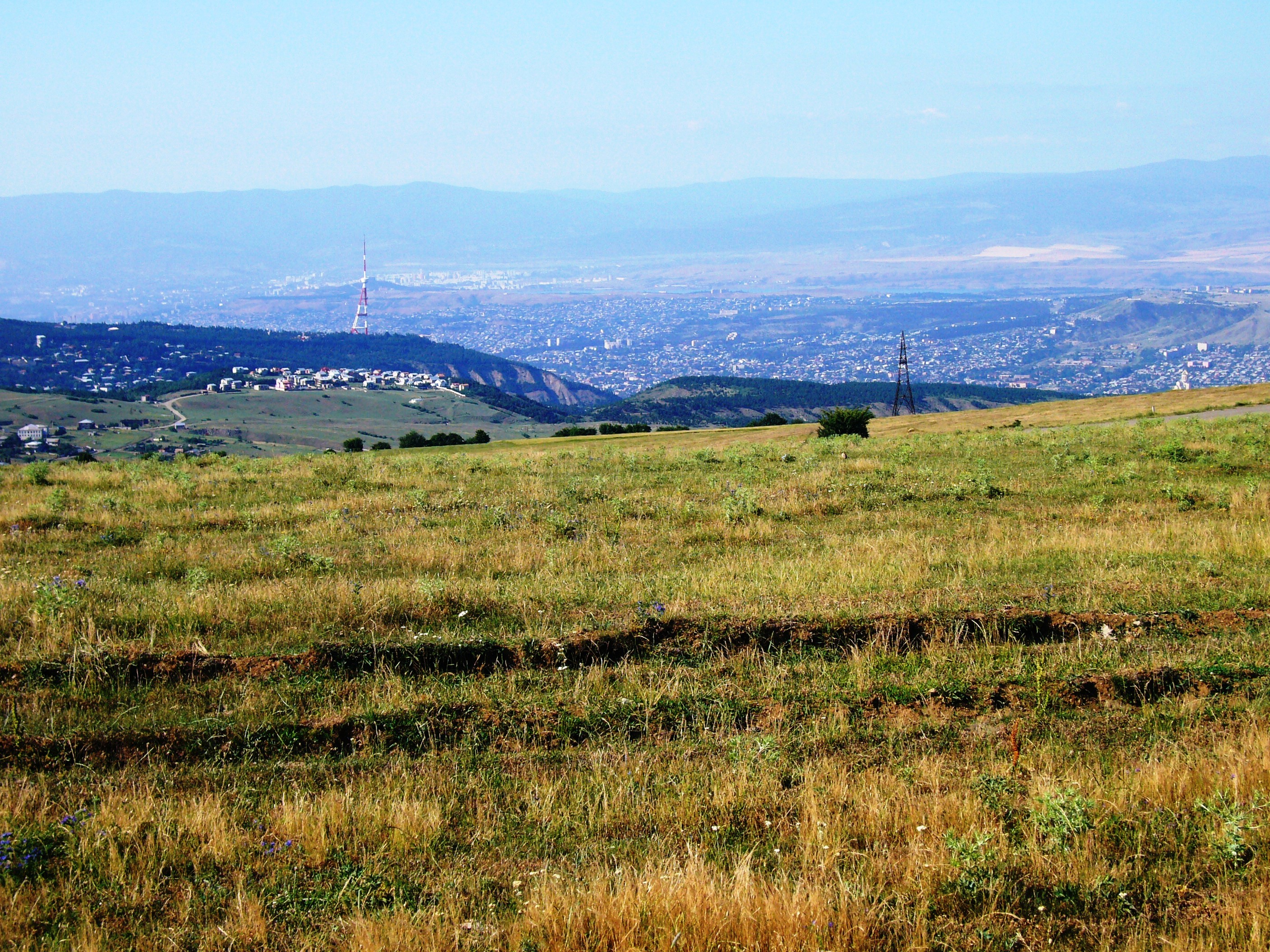
High plateau of Tabakhmela overlooking the Georgian capital Tbilisi, 2007

In 2007, the Sheikh Saud Bin Saqr Al Qasimi of Ras Al Khaimah, a member of the United Arab Emirates, visited Tabakhkmela for a groundbreaking ceremony after buying a huge plot of land there. The real estate developer Rakeen, owned by RAK Airways, RAK Properties, and Reyada Company (owned by the sheikh's family), pledged to develop the 200,000 square meter plateau into a luxury residential and commercial neighborhood, dubbed Tbilisi heights. Although glossy promotional material was prepared, nothing has ever been constructed. In 2010, Ras Al Khaimah decided to sell all foreign assets. At the time, the impact of the Dubai housing crash in 2009 had obliged Ras Al Khaimah to make serious efforts to reduce its 5 billion AED debts. The repatriation of capital held in Georgia was one of several measures by which Ras Al Khaimah tried to improve its credit rating. This was necessary in order to maintain control over spiraling borrowing costs, since the relatively poor emirate finances investments by raising funds on financial markets.
