= Kojori =

Kojori კოჯორი
- Town
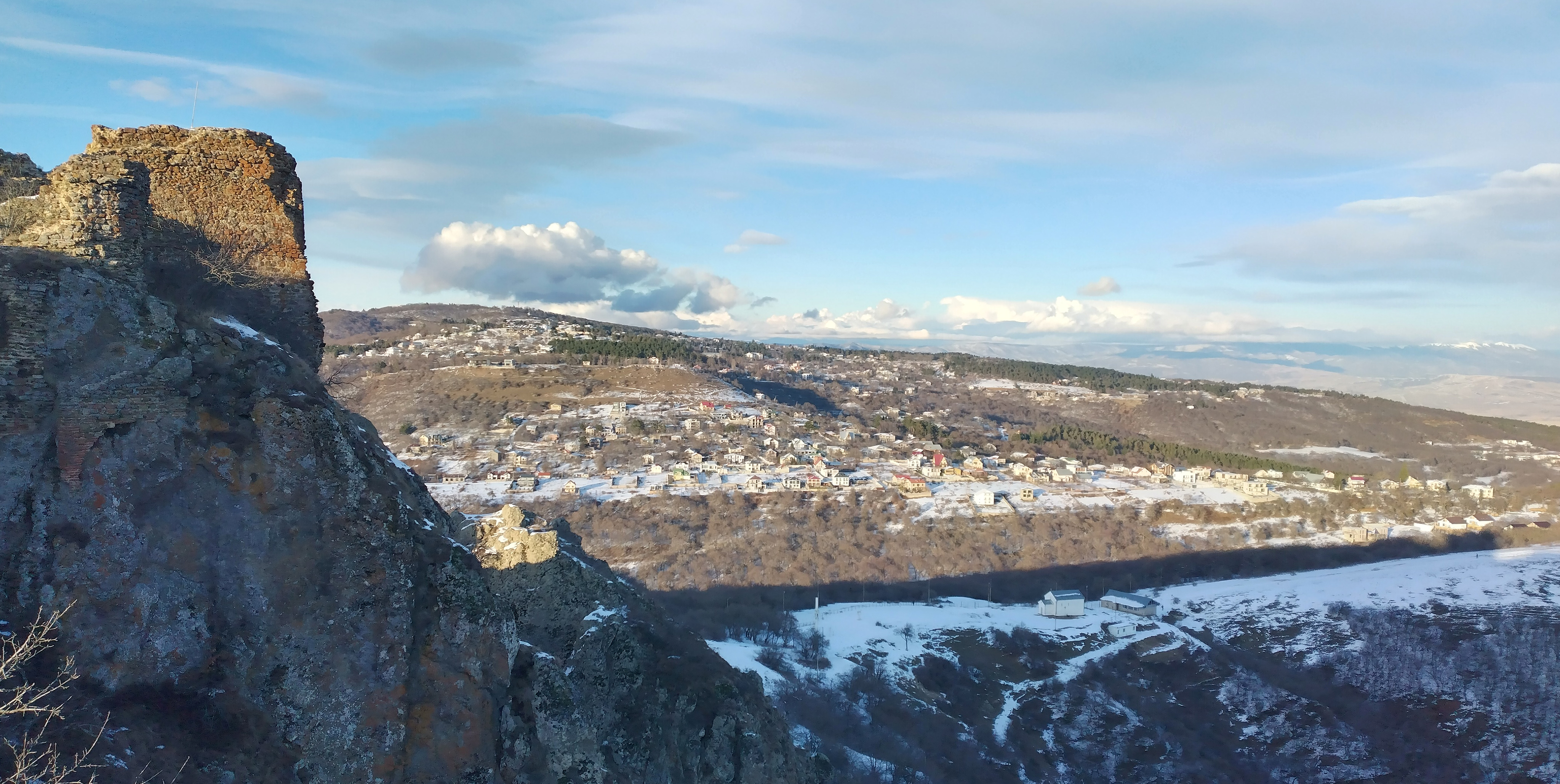

- Location within Georgia Location within Tbilisi
- Coordinates: 41°40′N 44°41′E
- Country: Georgia (country)
- Mkhare: Tbilisi
- Elevation: 1,350 m (4,430 ft)

Population (2014)
  - Total: 1 232
- Time zone: UTC+4 (Georgian Time)

Kojori (Georgian: კოჯორი [ˈk'o̞d͡ʒo̞ɾi]) is a small town (daba) in Georgia, some 20 kilometers southwest of the nation's capital of Tbilisi. It is a so-called "climate resort" and home to several holiday homes of the Tbilisite families.

South of the townlet, on Azeuli Hill, stands the medieval Kojori Fortress (also known as Agarani or Azeuli Fortress). The earliest layers of the fortress date to the late 11th century, but most of the structures are newer, dating to the 16th–18th centuries. During the Red Army invasion of Georgia in February 1921, the heights of Kojori saw heavy fighting between the Georgian and Russian SFSR forces. A monument to the Georgian Junkers (cadets) who died in this battle was erected on the site in the 1990s.

The medical wellness resort Bioli is also located in the recreation area of Kojori. The resort is well known for its unique concept which is based on an assessment of an oxidative stress at the level of the life unit – cell to prevent possible chronic diseases and premature ageing.

The SGT Giorgi Antsukhelidze NCO School and Center is located near Kojori. The center is named for SGT Antsukhelidze who was captured, tortured and murdered by South Ossetian militants during the 2008 Ossetian War. He was posthumously awarded the Order of National Hero by the Georgian government in 2013.

== The climate of Kojori ==
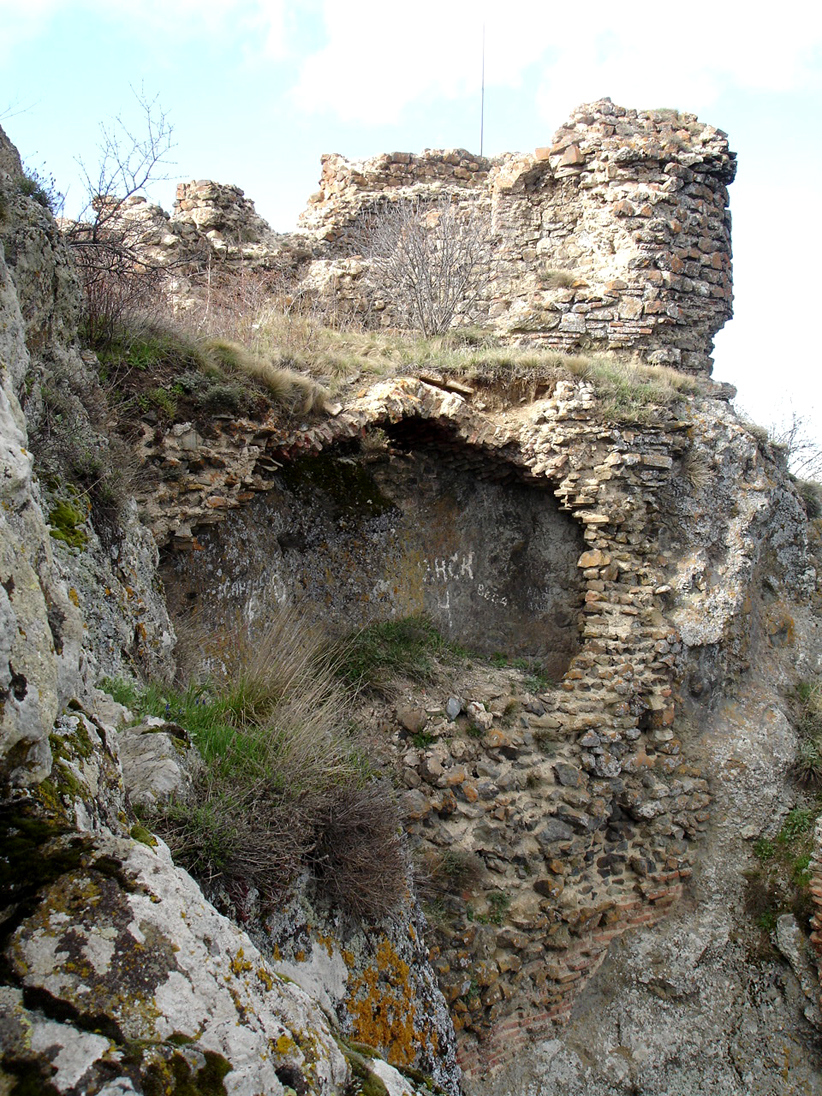
Ruins of the Kojori fortress

Kojori has been used for both passive and active climatotherapy for the treatment of lymphoid cells, tuberculosis of bones and joints, bronchitis and pleurisy.

The climate zone of the Kojori resort area is made up of an abundance of the sun's radiation, clear mountain air, a reasonably hot summer during which the day temperature is largely in the comfort zone, moderately strong winds, moderate humidity, deciduous and pine trees and fragrant grass meadows. The climate encourages restoration of the general tonus of the human body and resistance towards illnesses.

The climatotherapy of this zone is used to treat: cardio-vascular system diseases (first stage of essential hypertension; essential hypotension; first functional class of stable angina strain of heart ischemic disease; miocardiodistrophies of various aetiology; acquired cardiac anomaly of heart valves, without the stenosis of the left vein and aorta orifices, after 6–8 months of the extinguishment of rheumatic processes); first functional class of heart deficiency, pathologies of the respiratory system (obstructions and non-obstructive chronic bronchitis in the phase of remissions; light bronchial asthma (in the phase of remission)with or without deficiency of breathing of first degree; iron-deficiency – anaemia.

In addition, the climate of Kojori creates a remarkable prerequisite for aromatherapy. Academician G. Mukhadze, who was familiar with Kojori having visited this resort for decades, pointed out the fact that Kojori is blessed with favourable conditions for the treatment of children's diseases, especially gastro-enteric diseases. As revealed by the research of N. Kipshidze, after treatment in Kojori the haemoglobin in the blood of children rises by 10–25% and a high temperature is quickly normalised. It was due to these features that there were a number of sanatoria and medical institutions in Kojori in the past. Currently, they do not function.

== The history of Kojori ==
Kojori was known as Agarani in the past and the summer residence of the Georgian kings erected in the vicinity was referred to as the Agarani fortress (currently, Kojori fortress). It is believed that the fortress was built in the 11th century. Situated on the only highway leading from Somkhit-Sabaratiano to Tbilisi, it had an immense strategic significance for feudal Georgia. Therefore, it was always well-attended by the Georgian state figures.

Despite its strategic significance, Kojori was known as a summer residence. According to a distinguished historian and geographer of the 18th century, Vakhushti Batonishvili, King Rostom made Kojori the residence of the royal family in the 17th century. The Chronicles mention the visit of the greatest Georgian Queen, Tamar (12th–13th cc) to Kojori. She is believed to have lived in the Kojori fortress, together with her people, for more than six months in an attempt to restore her impaired health.

Starting from the 1850s, Kojori became the summer residence of the Transcaucasian Viceroy and a resting place of a number of famous people, including great Georgian writers and public figures.

== Battles with the participation of the Cadets ==
The battles between the Georgian Cadets and the Russian XI Army were held in Kojori. Colonel A. Chkheidze, a teacher V. Barnov, Lieutenant Andronikashvili, Gabashvili, a member of the founding council, Lieutenant Toidze and others fought together with 20–21-year-old cadets. Maro Makashvili also died during the fights in Kojori, preceding the Russian occupation in February 1921. 19-year-old Maro participated in the war as a volunteer nurse and sacrificed her life for the independence of her motherland. The dead bodies of the deceased Toidze, Makashvili and some of the cadets were buried in Tbilisi at the walls of the Soboro cathedral, but many cadets were buried in Kojori and it is also known that not only the dead bodies but also wounded cadets were buried alive by the adversary. A well-known Georgian poet, Terenti Graneli wrote a poem about this story.

== Monuments of culture ==
=== The Udzo Monastery ===
As the legend widely spread amongst the Kojori's population goes, this monastery was built by a person without an heir as a token for his future children. His request was granted and since then childless ladies came here to pray to St. George to give them children. After their prayers, they left a gift on one of the trees still named natvris khe (the tree of Desires). The names of both the mountain and the monastery are derived from the word udzeo (heirless). The beauty of the place makes an unforgettable impression on the visitor.
