= Bazaleti (historical area) =

- Historical region
- Location within Mtskheta-Mtianeti Location within Georgia
- Coordinates: 42°04′N 44°40′E
- Country: Georgia
- Mkhare: Mtskheta-Mtianeti

Bazaleti (Georgian: ბაზალეთი) is a historical area in eastern Georgia, located around the modern-day town of Dusheti (Mtskheta-Mtianeti region), where a village and a lake called Bazaleti can be found.

== Geography ==
Bazaleti lay on the right bank of the Aragvi river, being the south-westernmost in a chain of districts in the Aragvi valley. It stretched from south of the castle of Ananuri in the north to the vicinities of Mukhrani in the south, with the area of roughly 525 km^{2}, fertile in grain, barley, and millet.

== History ==
The first human settlements in the area called Bazaleti plateau date back to the Stone Age. Bazaleti is first mentioned—as being plundered by the Caucasian tribe of Dzurdzuk—in the early medieval Georgian account of the reign of Mirvan, the second king in the traditional royal list of Kartli (Iberia), whose rule can be relegated to the 2nd century BC. Bazaleti is also mentioned in the 7th-century Armenian geography attributed to Ananias of Shirak. The 9th-century Muslim author al-Baladhuri reports the Arab conquest of Bazaleti (Bāzalīt).

A century later, in the middle of the 10th century, Bazaleti and the adjoining strategic areas between the rivers Ksani and Aragvi were contested between the rulers of Abasgia and Kakheti. In the last years of the 13th century, Bazaleti was overrun by the Mongols who fought David VIII of Georgia. With the emergence of the Duchy of Aragvi, Bazaleti became one of its principal districts.
