= Giorgi Saakadze =

Georgian politician and military commander (c.1570–1629)

- გიორგი სააკაძე
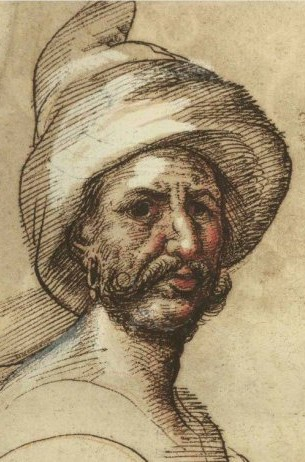
- Portrait of Saakadze by Teramo Castelli, 17th century
- Born: c. 1570; Peli, Kingdom of Kartli
- Died: October 3, 1629; Aleppo, Ottoman Empire
- Children: Avtandil; Paata; Ioram
- Military career
- Allegiance: Kingdom of Kartli; Kingdom of Kakheti; Safavid Persia; Ottoman Empire
- Nickname: Grand Mouravi
- Conflicts: Battle of Tashiskari; Kartli-Kakhetian Uprising (1625); Battle of Martqopi; Battle of Marabda; Battle of Ksani; Battle of Bazaleti; Ottoman–Safavid war (1603–1612); Safavid capture of Tabriz (1603); Ottoman–Safavid War (1623–1639); Capture of Baghdad (1624)

Giorgi Saakadze (Georgian: გიორგი სააკაძე; c. 1570 – October 3, 1629) was a Georgian politician and military commander who played an important role in the politics of the early 17th-century Georgia. He is credited with playing off the rival Ottoman and Persian empires against each other to help the fractured Georgian nation survive. Saakadze was a controversial figure and his risky schemes ultimately caught up with him with tragic personal consequences - his son was executed by the Persians and later he himself was put to death by the Turks.

Saakadze's life is depicted by the eponymous film, which the Soviet authorities used for winning over Georgian nationalist sentiments during World War II, with Joseph Stalin personally involved in scripting it. On the opposite side, Nazi Germany named Wehrmacht 797th Battalion, one of the Georgian battalions, in Saakdze's honor.

== Biography ==
Giorgi Saakadze was born in 1570 in Noste village (Peli village by other sources), near the town on Kaspi. Saakadze's family came from the untitled nobility (samepo aznauri). His father, Siaush, rose to prominence through his loyal service to King Simon I of Kartli, whom Giorgi joined in military service in his early career. Under the young king Luarsab II, he was appointed a mouravi of Tbilisi, Tskhinvali, and Dvaleti in 1608. Saakadze's influence and prestige especially grew after he destroyed an Ottoman invasion force at the battle of Tashiskari in June 1609, thereby saving Luarsab from being dislodged. In 1611, the king married Saakadze's sister, Makrine, annoying the great nobles, who grew increasingly suspicious of the ambitious and aspiring officer who had risen from the ranks of the petty nobility to become the most powerful man in Kartli. The animosity between the two noble parties centered on the princes Parsadan Tsitsishvili and Shadiman Baratashvili on one hand, and Saakadze on the other. The nobles convinced Luarsab that Saakadze was an Iranian traitor, prompting him to divorce Makrine and authorize a plot to kill him in May 1612. Saakadze escaped the trap and fled to Iran. He quickly won the confidence of Shah Abbas I of Iran by converting to Islam and displaying his military ability in Iran's war with the Ottomans, and was regularly consulted on the Georgian affairs.

In 1614, Saakadze took revenge on Luarsab and his nobles by aiding Shah Abbas in the invasion of Georgia which brought Luarsab's reign to an end, but dissuaded the Iranians from committing atrocities in Kartli after the nation surrendered. In 1619, the shah appointed him a vekil (regent) to Simon II, the Iranian nominee to the throne of Kartli. Saakadze turned into a de facto ruler of Kartli. Once the hostilities with the Ottomans resumed, Saakadze served as one of the leading commanders in the shah's ranks from 1621 to 1623. His military exploits led Abbas to appoint him to the staff of Qarachaqay Khan who led a 35,000-strong army to crush a rebellion in Georgia. Saakadze then discovered that the Shah planned to massacre all armed Kartlians, including himself. He conspired with the rebel leaders—his brother-in-law Zurab of Aragvi and king Teimuraz I of Kakheti—and ambushed the Iranian army at Martqopi on March 25, 1625, winning a decisive victory. Saakadze went on to annihilate the Turkic nomads transplanted by the Iranian government to replace the exiled Georgian population, dislodged the shah's governor Paykar Khan from Kakheti and raided the Iranian garrisons as far as Ganja and Karabakh. In an act of revenge, Shah Abbas put Saakadze's younger son, Paata, to death, and sent his severed head to the Georgians. A punitive Iranian expedition followed soon thereafter, which won a costly victory over the Georgians at the Battle of Marabda. Saakadze withdrew into the mountains, and organized a powerful guerrilla resistance which forced Abbas I to recognize Teimuraz's royal status.

However, the unity of Georgian nobles quickly collapsed. Saakadze's opposition to Teimuraz's control of Kartli led to a bitter conflict which culminated in the fratricidal battle of Bazaleti in the fall of 1626. The royal army won a victory, driving Saakadze into exile to Constantinople where he entered the service of Sultan Murad IV. He briefly served as a governor of the Konya Vilayet and fought against the Iranians at Erzurum (1627-1628), and in Meskheti (1628). However, Grand Vizier Ekrem Hüsrev Pasha soon accused Saakadze of treason and had him, along with his son Avtandil, Prince Kaikhosro of Mukhrani, and other Georgians, put to death in Constantinople on October 3, 1629.

Saakadze's last surviving son, Ioram, later attained to the princely rank, and founded the House of Tarkhan-Mouravi, one of the most prestigious Georgian noble families.

== Family ==
Giorgi Saakadze was married to Marekhi, daughter of Nugzar, Duke of Aragvi. Their children were:

- Avtandil (died 1629), killed alongside his father;
- Paata (died 1625);
- David (fl. 1626);
- Ioram (died 1664), who founded the House of Tarkhan-Mouravi;
- Ana-Khanum, who married Gorgasal Chkheidze (died 1629).

== In culture ==
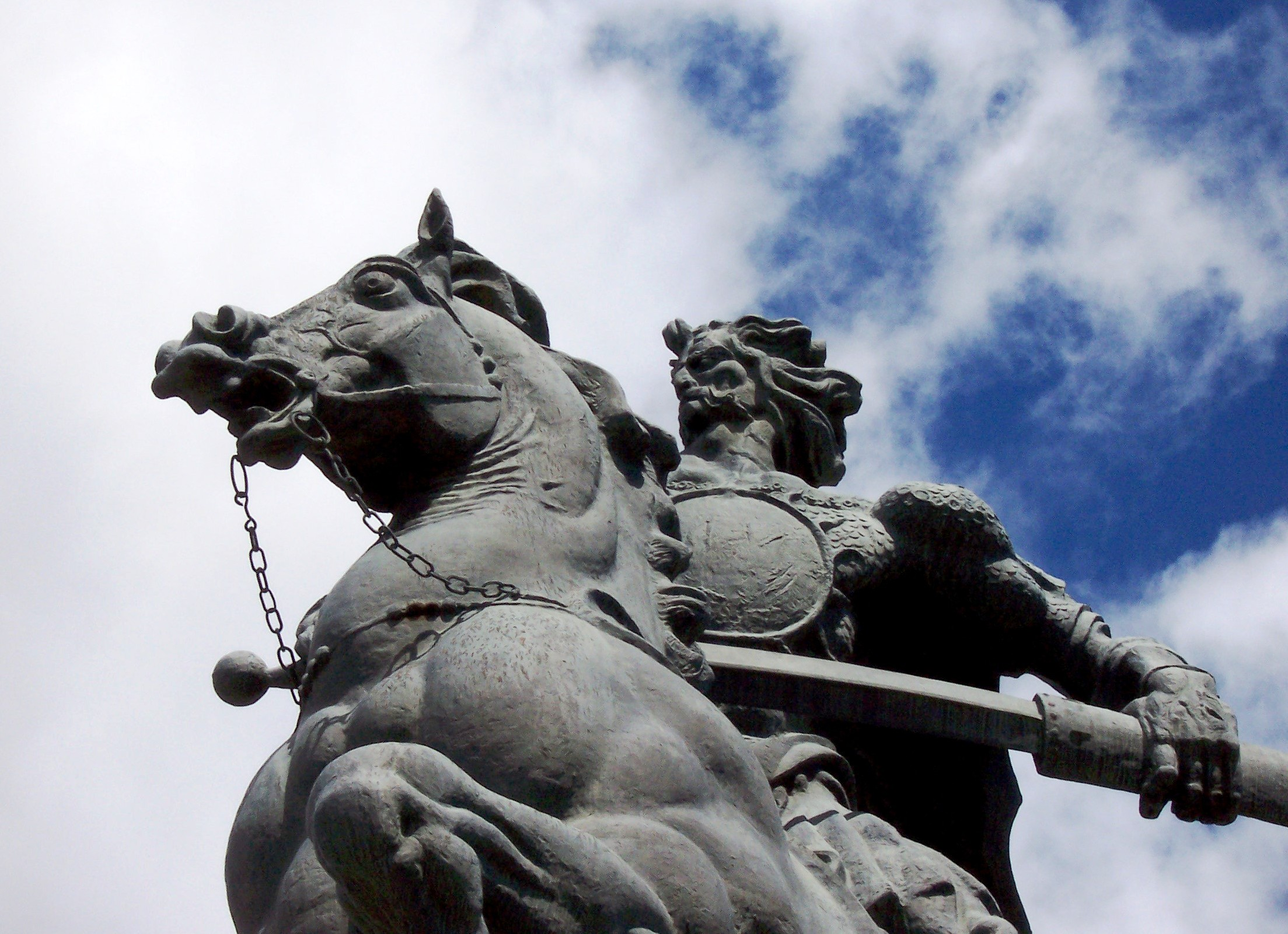
The Giorgi Saakadze statue in Kaspi, Georgia.

Saakadze's controversial career has always been a source of conflicting perceptions of his role in Georgia's history.

The traditional historiography of Georgia, heavily influenced by Prince Vakhushti and Marie Brosset, continued to view him as a feudal adventurer and ambitious warlord involved in the turbulent whirl of intrigues and disturbances which fill the history of seventeenth-century Georgia.

The first attempt at the rehabilitation of Saakadze was made by his relative Metropolitan Joseph of Tbilisi in his poem The Grand Mouravi (დიდმოურავიანი, didmouraviani; 1681–87).

Starting in the early 20th century, some Georgian authors have also tried to emphasize the positive aspects of Saakadze's biography, particularly his contribution to the 1625 rebellion which frustrated Shah Abbas's plan to convert the eastern Georgian lands into the Qizilbash khanates.

In the 1940s, Joseph Stalin’s wartime propaganda established Saakadze as a major symbol of Georgian patriotism. In October 1940, Stalin commented on Saakadze, proclaiming that the Grand Mouravi’s hopes for Georgia’s "unification into one state through the establishment of royal absolutism and of the liquidation of the power of the princes" had been progressive. In an apparent move to encourage Georgian nationalism in order to gain the loyalty of the population during the war with Germany, Stalin himself was involved in modifying the script for an epic movie, Giorgi Saakadze, commissioned from the Georgian film director Mikheil Chiaureli in 1942-1943. Stalin dismissed a script by the Georgian writer Giorgi Leonidze and approved the one by Anna Antonovskaya and Boris Chenry, adapted from Antonovskaya's 1942 Stalin Prize-winning six-volume novel, The Great Mouravi (Russian: Великий Моурави).

The film emphasized that Saakadze, initially an obscure squire, was a victim of machinations at the hands of the wealthy feudal lords who would sacrifice everything, including their motherland, for their own benefit. It intentionally avoided any mention of Saakadze's own adventures and illustrated him as a popular leader against the external aggressors. In the atmosphere of suspicion and spy mania in the Soviet Union during these years, the movie also served contemporary propaganda by emphasizing that treason against the popular leader, and hence the country, was to be punished cruelly. Giorgi Saakadze was also the name of the Wehrmacht's 797th Battalion, one of the Georgian battalions formed by the Germans to fight the Soviet Union.
