= Battle of Martkopi =

1625 battle

Coordinates: 41°47′17″N 45°1′11″E

- Part of Kartli-Kakhetian Uprising (1625)
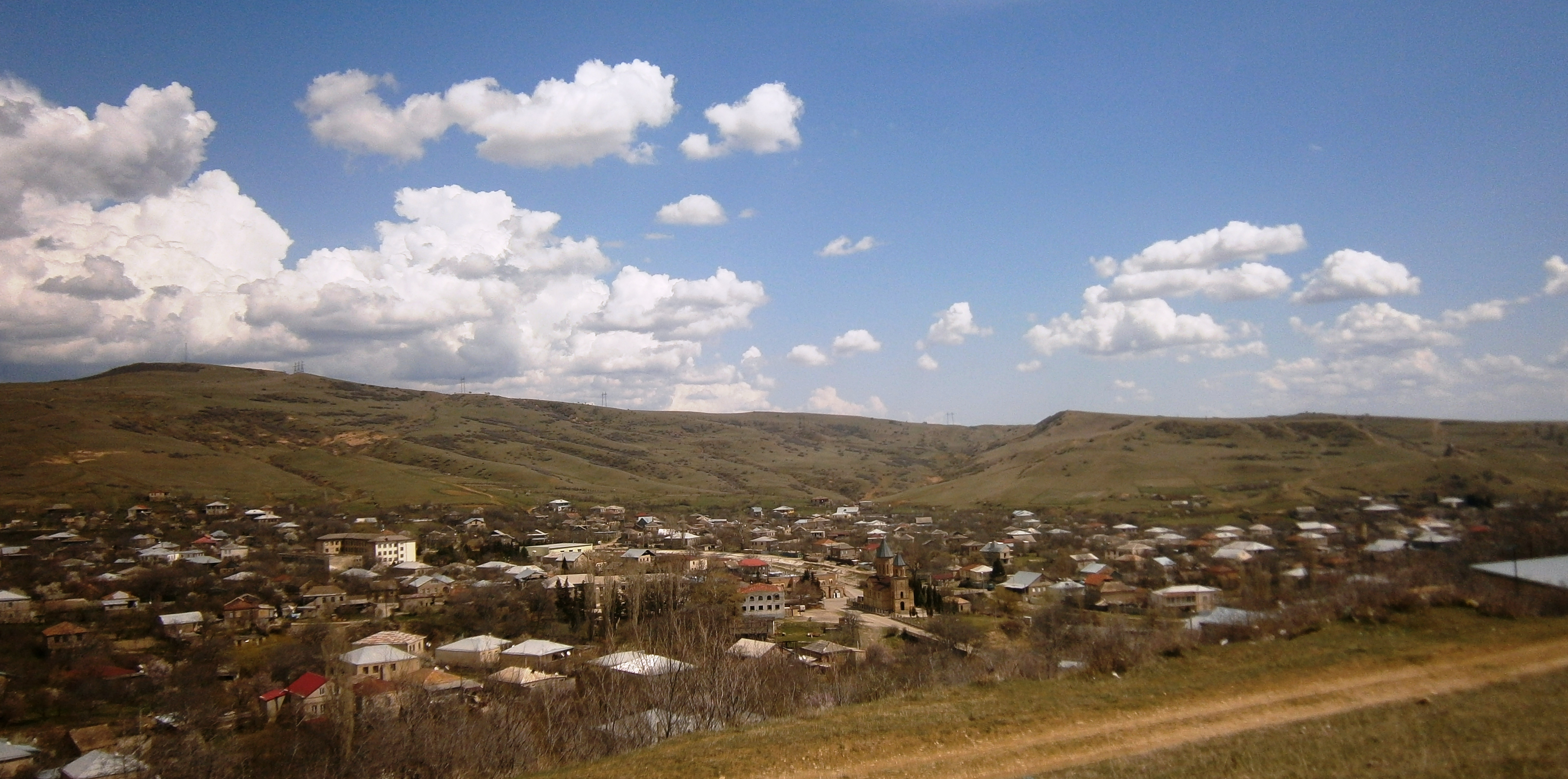
- Vicinity of Martkopi
Date	25 March 1625
Location	Near the village Martkopi
Result	Georgian victory
Territorial changes	Georgians capture Tbilisi

Belligerents
Kingdom of Kartli; Kingdom of Kakheti	Safavid Iran

Commanders and leaders
Giorgi Saakadze; Zurab of Aragvi	Qarachaqay Khan †; Imamverd-Beg †; Yusuf-Khan †

Strength
10,000	30,000

Casualties and losses
Unknown	27,000

The Battle of Martkopi (Georgian: მარტყოფის ბრძოლა) (Persian: نبرد مارتقوپی) was a 1625 military confrontation between the Georgian Kingdoms of Kartli and Kakheti and Safavid Iran. The Georgians, led by general Giorgi Saakadze, annihilated an Iranian detachment of Shah-Abbas I.

== Battle ==
In spring 1625, in order to avoid a forthcoming revolt, Shah-Abbas I sent his troops into Georgia under the orders of Qarachaqay Khan. He attempted to carry out the policy of wholesale massacre and deportation in Kartli. Apparently, the Shah did not fully trust Giorgi as he took his son Paata hostage, after appointing Giorgi the adviser to the Persian general. By the side of Giorgi in the army of the enemy, there was another son of his, Avtandil. Upon Giorgi's advice, Qarachaqay Khan dispatched most of his troops to different parts of Javakheti, caused them disperse and made them easier to defeat. The Georgians owe their success to the preparations carried out by commander-in-chief Saakadze. According to the plans of the leaders of the revolt, the Georgians were to assault the enemy camp earlier than planned; Saakadze and his entourage were to slaughter the commanders of the Persian army. At dawn on 25 March, Annunciation, the joint Kartlian and Kakhetian troops approached the enemy's camp. Hearing the noise, the guards gave alarm. All Persian commanders gathered in Qarachaqay Khan's tent and also summoned Giorgi. Giorgi killed Qarachaqay Khan with help of his son, while Avtandil took the life of Qarachaqay's son. It did not take long for Giorgi and his entourage to slaughter the stunned Persian commanders. The rest of the Georgians under their second commander Zurab, Duke of Aragvi, encroached upon the confused enemy who were left without any guidance at that time. After a fierce and bloody massacre throughout the evening, the Georgians won a crushing victory. The data about the Martkopi battle are given in “the Life of Kartli” and by a Turkish chronicler Mustafa Naima of the 17th century. In the aftermath of the battle, the Georgians took Tbilisi and drove the Persians out of other regions, while half of the Shah's army which did not take part in the battle, still remained combat effective.

== Sources ==
- Lortkipanidze, Mariam; Japaridze, Otar; Muskhelishvili, David; Metreveli, Roin (2012). History of Georgia in four volumes, vol. II - History of Georgia from the 13th century to the 19th century. Tbilisi: National Academy of Sciences of Georgia. ISBN 978-9941-19-407-8.
