= Battle of Bazaleti =

1626 battle in Georgia

Date	fall of 1626
Location	near Bazaleti Lake 42.039°N 44.678°E
Result	Teimuraz I of Kakheti victory

Belligerents
Teimuraz I's supporters	Giorgi Saakadze's supporters

Commanders and leaders
Teimuraz I; Zurab of Aragvi; Iotam Amilakhvari	Giorgi Saakadze; Kaikhosro of Mukhrani; Jesse of Ksani

The Battle of Bazaleti (Georgian: ბაზალეთის ბრძოლა, bazalet’is brdzola) was fought between the two rival Georgian parties centered respectively on Teimuraz I of Kakheti and his defiant noble Giorgi Saakadze in the fall of 1626.

The battle was a culmination of the power struggle that evolved after the Georgian nobles rallied behind Teimuraz and Saakadze and recovered much of eastern Georgian kingdoms of Kartli and Kakheti from the Iranian occupation. Shah Abbas I of Iran used the rivalry between Teimuraz and Saakadze to divide the Georgians into two opposing parties and to punish Saakadze who had formerly fought under the Iranian ranks.

The battle took place at the Bazaleti Lake in eastern Georgia, some 60 km (37 mi) northwest of Tbilisi. In a pitched battle, Saakadze's backup man, Davit’ Gogrishvili, was killed and his demoralized forces were routed by the royal army. Saakadze fled to the Ottoman Empire where he was assassinated in 1629 after serving a brief but successful military career under Sultan Ibrahim I.
