= Mother Heroine (disambiguation) =

Mother Heroine was an honorary title in the Soviet Union

Mother Heroine may also refer to:

- Mother Heroine (Russia)
- Mother Heroine (Albania)

== See also ==
- Order of Maternal Glory
- Order of Mother, Belarus
- Vietnamese Heroic Mother
- Cross of Honour of the German Mother
- Médaille de l'enfance et des familles
