= Natalism =

Belief that promotes human reproduction

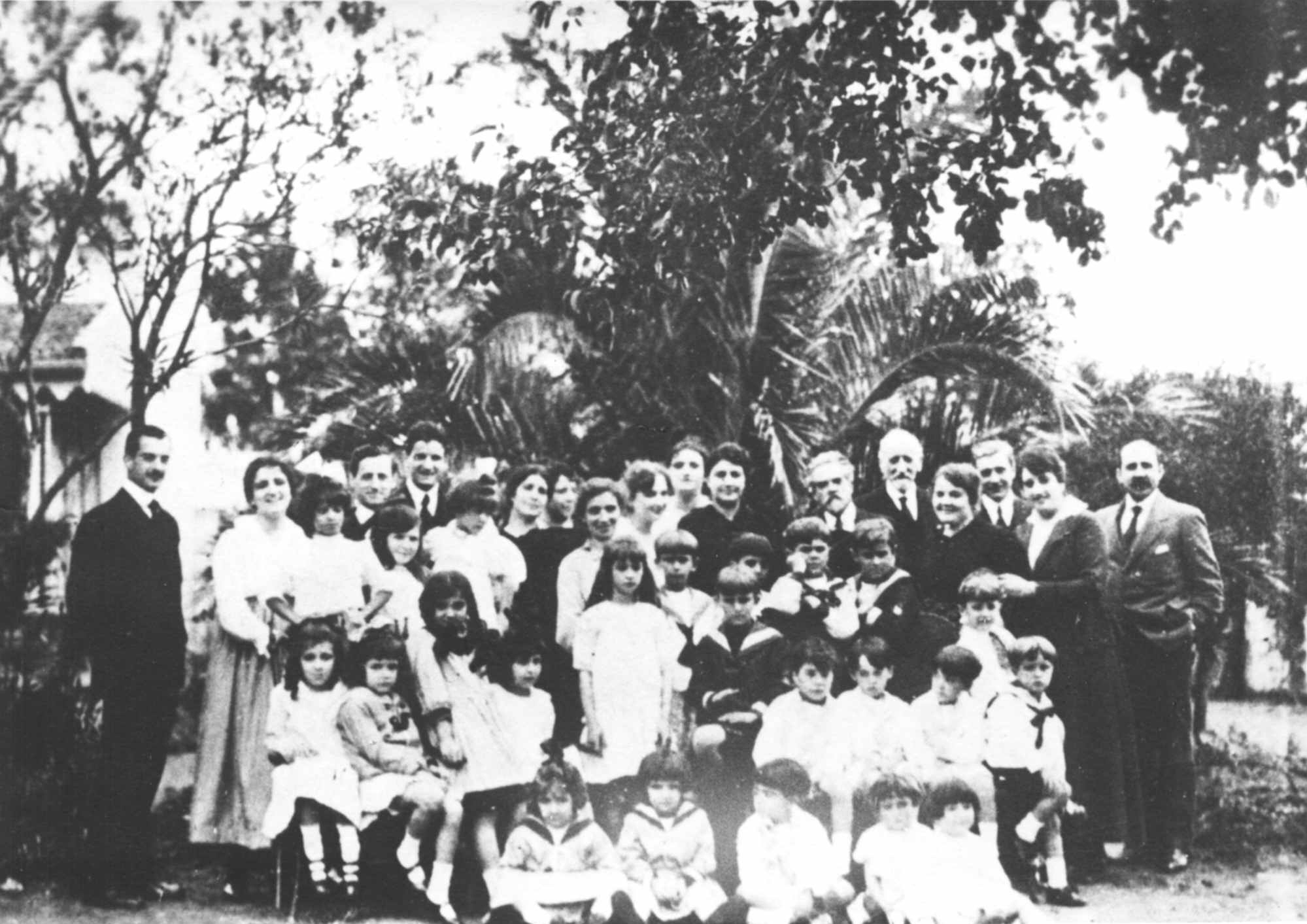
Uruguayan poet Juan Zorrilla de San Martín, surrounded by his family. Twice married, he fathered 16 children during his life.

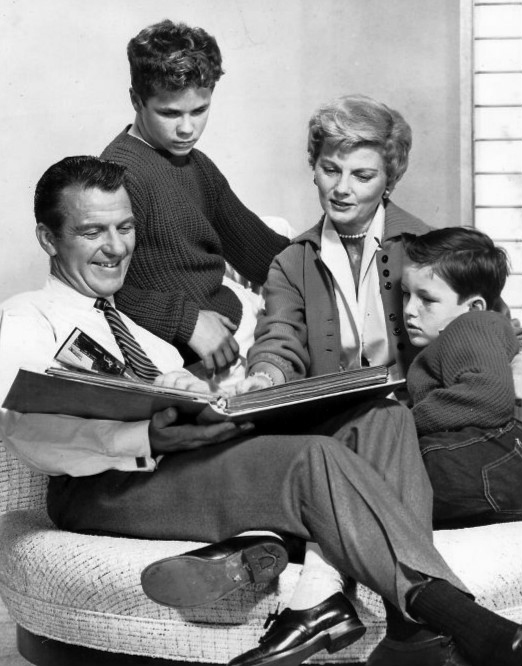
Example of an American family in 1960, during the baby boom.

Natalism (also called pronatalism or the pro-birth position) is a policy paradigm or personal value that promotes the reproduction of human life as an important objective of humanity and therefore advocates a high birthrate.

According to the Merriam-Webster dictionary, the term, as it relates to the belief itself, dates from 1971 and comes from French: nataliste, formed from French: natalité, birthrate.

As a population decline is observed in many countries associated with ageing and cultural modernization, attempts at a political response are growing. According to the UN, the share of countries with pronatalist policies had grown from 20% in 2005 to 28% in 2019.

In recent decades, many countries have implemented pronatalist policies to counteract declining birth rates and aging populations. These policies often include financial incentives such as baby bonuses, tax breaks, and direct payments to families with children. However, experts note that financial incentives alone may be insufficient, and that factors such as work-family balance, cultural values, and societal support systems play significant roles in influencing birth rates.

== Motives ==
Generally, natalism promotes child-bearing and parenthood as desirable for social reasons and to ensure the continuance of humanity. Some philosophers have noted that if humans fail to have children, humans would become extinct.

=== Religion ===
Many religions encourage procreation, and religiousness in members can sometimes correlate to higher rates of fertility. Judaism, Islam, and many branches of Christianity, including the Church of Jesus Christ of Latter-day Saints and the Catholic Church, encourage procreation. In 1979 one research paper indicated that Amish people had an average of 6.8 children per family. Among some conservative Protestants, the Quiverfull movement advocates for large families and views children as blessings from God.

Those who adhere to a more traditionalist framing may therefore seek to limit access to abortion and contraception, as well. The 1968 encyclical Humanae Vitae, for example, criticized artificial contraception and advocated for a natalist position.

Natalist views are also often driven by economic and political concerns, particularly in countries facing aging populations and declining birth rates. Governments may support pronatalist policies to sustain labor forces and social welfare systems.

=== Politics ===
Beginning around the early 2020s, the threat of "global demographic collapse" began to become a cause célèbre among wealthy tech and venture-capitalist circles as well as the political right. In Europe, former Hungarian prime minister Viktor Orbán made natalism a key plank of his political platform. In the United States, key figures include Kevin Dolan, organizer of the Natal Conference, Simone and Malcolm Collins, founders of Pronatalist.org, and Elon Musk, who has repeatedly used his public platform to discuss global birth rates.

The right-wing proponents of pronatalism argue that falling birthrates could lead to economic stagnation, diminished innovation, and an unsustainable burden on social systems due to an aging population. The movement suggests that without a significant increase in birth rates, the sustainability of civilizations could be in danger; Elon Musk has called it a "much bigger risk" than global warming.

=== Intention to have children ===
United States birth rate; the baby boom (1946–1964) is shown in red.

An intention to have children is a substantial fertility factor in actually ending up doing so, but childless individuals who intend to have children immediately or within two or three years are generally more likely to succeed than those who intend to have children in the long term. There are many determinants of the intention to have children, including:

- the preference of family size, which influences that of the children through early adulthood. Likewise, the extended family influences fertility intentions, with increased numbers of nephews and nieces increasing the preferred number of children. These effects may be observed in the case of Mormon or modern Israeli demographics.
- social pressure from kin and friends to have another child, such as overall cultural normativity.
- social support. However, a study from West Germany came to the conclusion that both men receiving no support at all and men receiving support from many different people have a lower probability of intending to have another child, with the latter probably related to coordination problems.
- happiness, with happier people tending to want more children. However, other research has shown that the social acceptability of the choice to have or not have children plays a significant factor in reproductive decisions. The social stigma, marginalization, and even domestic violence that accompanies those without children, by choice or chance, is a significant factor in their feelings of happiness or belonging within their communities.
- secure housing situation, and feeling of overall economic stability more generally.

== Concrete policies ==
Natalism in public policy typically seeks to create financial and social incentives for populations to reproduce, such as providing tax incentives that reward having and supporting children.

Some countries with population decline offer incentives to the people to have large families as a means of national efforts to reverse declining populations. Incentives may include a one-time baby bonus, or ongoing child benefit payments or tax reductions. Some impose penalties or taxes on those with fewer children. Some nations, such as Japan, Singapore, and South Korea, have implemented, or tried to implement, interventionist natalist policies, creating incentives for larger families.

Paid maternity and paternity leave policies can also be used as an incentive. For example, Sweden has generous parental leave wherein parents are entitled to share 16 months' paid leave per child, the cost divided between both employer and state. However, it appears not to work as desired.

=== Natalist awards ===
==== Current ====
- Mother Heroine (Russia) Since 2022, to mothers who have given birth to and raised ten or more children.
- Altyn Alka (Kazakhstan) awarded to mothers who have raised at least seven children.
- Kumis Alka (Kazakhstan) awarded to mothers who have raised at least six children.

==== Former ====
- Mother Heroine (Soviet Union) 1944–1991
- Order of Maternal Glory (Soviet Union) 1944–1991
- Cross of Honour of the German Mother (Nazi Germany) 1939–1945
- Mother Heroine (Albania) 1940s
- Glory to the Mother (Albania) honorary award given to mothers with nine children; this was later lowered to seven children

=== Postcommunist ===
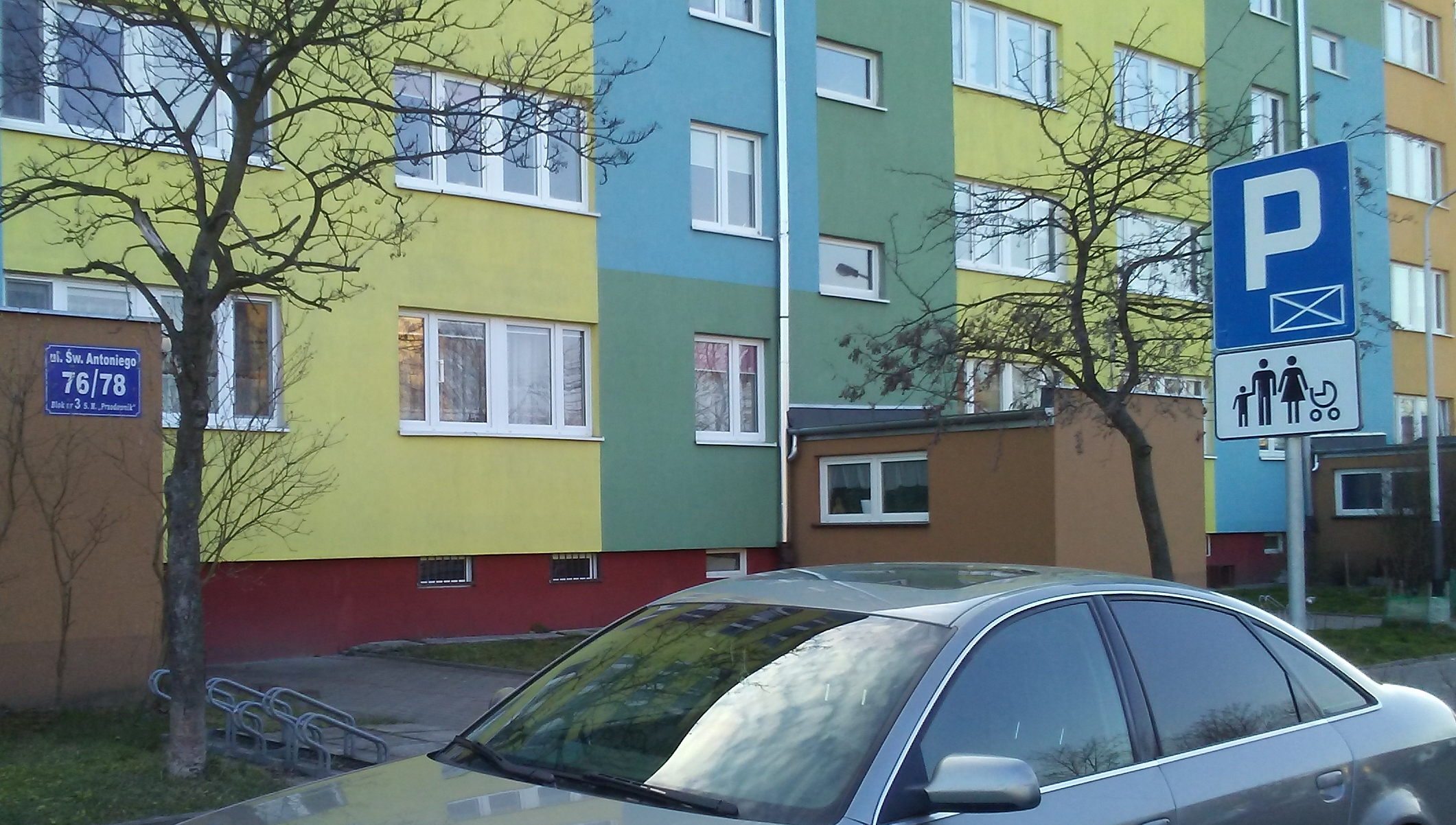
Parking place for families with children, residential area. Tomaszów Mazowiecki, Poland

==== Russia ====
Natalist thinking was common during Soviet times. After a brief adherence to the strict Communist doctrine in 1920s and attempts to raise children communally, coupled with the government-provided healthcare, the Soviet government switched to neo-traditionalism, promoting family values and sobriety, banning abortions and making divorces harder to obtain, advancing natalist ideals that made mockery of irresponsible parents. When the expanded opportunities for female employment caused a population crisis in the 1930s, government had expanded access to child care starting at the age of two. After the Great Patriotic War the skewed ratio of men to women prompted additional financial assistance to women who had children or were pregnant. Despite the promotion and long maternity leave with maintenance of employment and salary, modernization still caused birthrates to continue to slide into the 1970s.

The end of the USSR in 1991 was accompanied by a large drop in fertility. In 2006, Vladimir Putin made demographics an important issue, instituting a two-pronged approach of direct financial rewards and socio-cultural policies. The notable example of the former is the maternal-capital program where the woman is provided with subsidies that can be spent only on improved housing or the education of a child (and can also be saved for the retirement).

In August 2022, Russia revived the Soviet-era Mother Heroine award for women with ten children.

In November 2024, President Putin signed a bill into law that bans 'Childfree Propaganda’ to boost birthrates in Russia. Russia is the first nation in the world to pass such a law.

==== Hungary ====
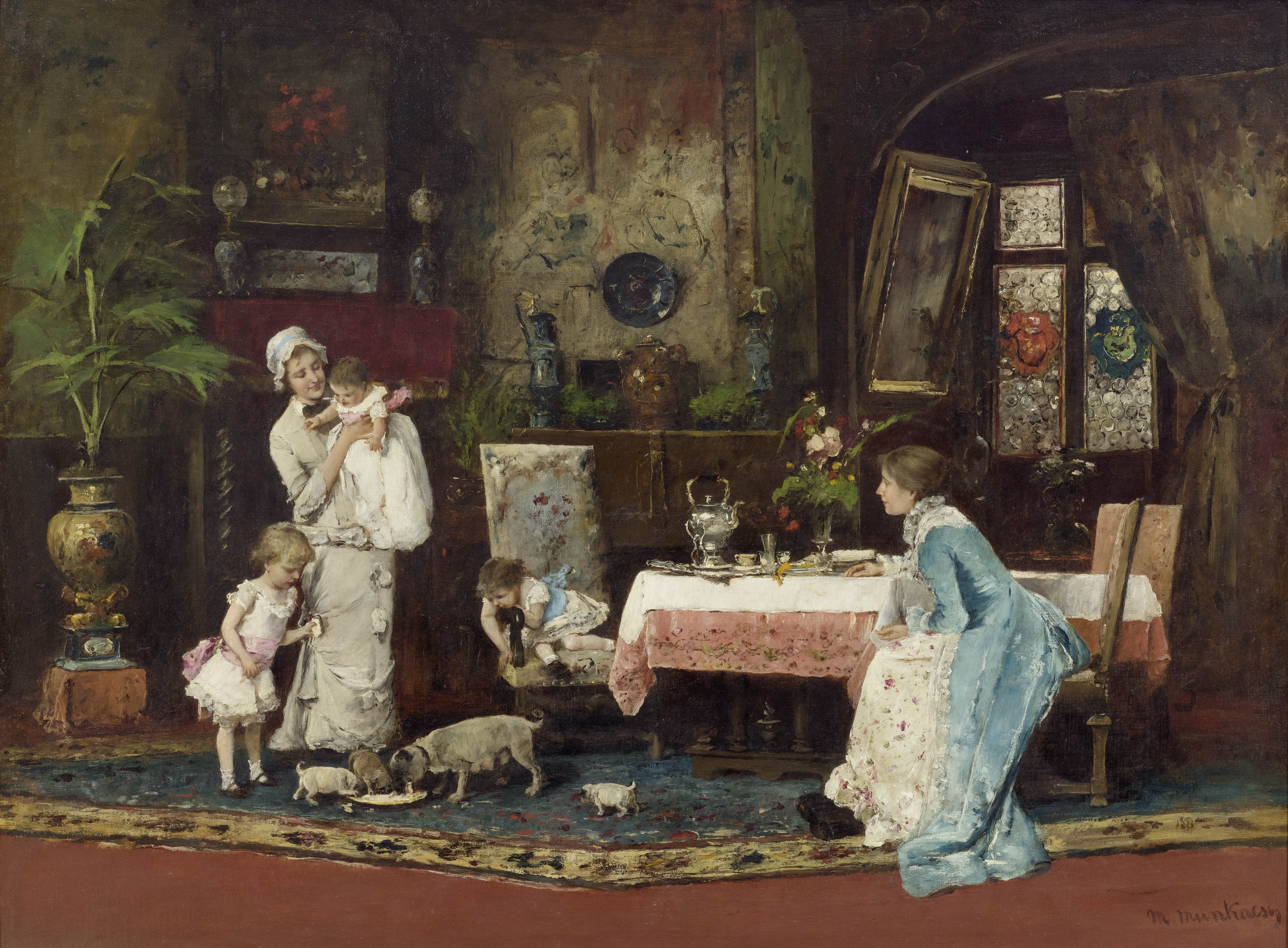
Two families by Mihály Munkácsy (1877)

The Hungarian government of Viktor Orbán in 2019 announced pecuniary incentives (including eliminating taxes for mothers with more than three children, and reducing credit payments and easier access to loans), and expanding day care and kindergarten access.

The Hungarian government has introduced extensive family support measures, including tax exemptions for mothers with three or more children, subsidized housing loans, and lifetime income tax exemptions for mothers with four or more children. Despite these efforts, Hungary's fertility rate remains below the replacement level, with experts suggesting that financial incentives alone may not be sufficient to address the underlying demographic challenges.

== Critics ==
Natalism has been criticized on human-rights and environmental grounds. Some reproductive rights advocates and environmentalists see natalism as a driver of reproductive injustice, population growth, and ecological overshoot. In U.S. political reporting, some coverage of pronatalist conferences and networks has noted overlaps in certain cases with far-right or eugenicist ideas.

== See also ==
- Antinatalism
- Baby boom
- Bachelor tax
- Child tax credit
- Family values
- Heteronormativity
- Jus trium liberorum
- Tax on childlessness
- Population decline

== Sources ==
- Kouprianova, Nina (December 2013). "Modernity and natalism in Russia: Historic perspectives". European Journal of Government and Economics. 2 (2): 149–159. doi:10.17979/ejge.2013.2.2.4293. hdl:2183/23366. ISSN 2254-7088. S2CID 142587197. Archived from the original on 23 April 2018.
- [2]United Nations Department of Economic and Social Affairs. (2019). World Population Policies 2019. https://www.un.org/en/development/desa/population/publications
- [3]The Economist. (2023). "Why some governments are trying to get people to have more babies." https://www.economist.com
