= Hero (title) =

Government-awarded title

The title of Hero is presented by various governments in recognition of acts of self-sacrifice to the state, and great achievements in combat or labor. It is originally a Soviet-type honor, and is continued by several nations including Belarus, Russia, and Ukraine. It was also awarded to cities and fortresses for collective efforts in heroic feats. Each hero receives a medal for public display, special privileges and rights for life, and the admiration and respect of the nation. Some countries without Soviet connections also award Hero honours.

== Soviet titles ==
=== Hero of the Soviet Union ===
The first hero title established, "Hero of the Soviet Union", was created by decree of the Presidium of the Supreme Soviet of the USSR on 16 April 1934. The identifying badge, the "Gold Star Medal", was not created until 1 August 1939. The title was awarded for "personal or collective deeds of heroism rendered to the USSR or socialist society" and it was awarded to both military personnel and civilians.

=== Hero of Socialist Labor ===
The second hero title was "Hero of Socialist Labor", also created by decree of the Presidium of the Supreme Soviet of the USSR, was established on 27 December 1938. Its badge, the "Hammer and Sickle Medal", was created on 22 May 1940. The title was awarded for heroic labor achievements which significantly increased production, "thereby promoting the national economy, science, culture, might, and glory of the USSR."

Each "Hero of the Soviet Union" and "Hero of Socialist Labor" was given the highest Soviet award, the Order of Lenin, and a diploma describing the heroic accomplishment.

A "Hero of Socialist Labor" held the same official stature as a "Hero of the Soviet Union", with identical rights and privileges, but the title's prestige was eroded by the sheer numbers awarded (over 19,000 compared to 12,745).

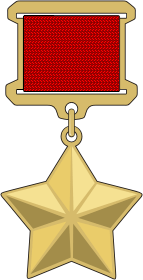
Gold Star Medal

Hammer and Sickle Medal

=== Mother Heroine ===
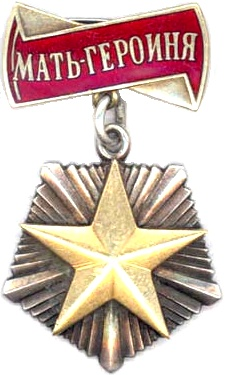
Order of the Mother Heroine.

The third hero title was "Mother Heroine", established on 8 July 1944 by Decree of the Presidium of the Supreme Soviet. The title was awarded for bearing and raising a large family, usually meaning 10 or more children.

=== Hero-City, Hero-Fortress ===
The Soviet Union awarded the title to twelve (12) cities and one fortress for outstanding heroism during the Eastern Front (1941–1945).

The twelve Soviet cities awarded the title "Hero-City" are

- Minsk,
- Smolensk,
- Kiev (Kyiv),
- Odessa (Odesa),
- Moscow,
- Leningrad (Saint Petersburg),
- Tula,
- Sevastopol,
- Kerch,
- Murmansk,
- Stalingrad (Volgograd), and
- Novorossiysk.

The one fortress awarded the title "Hero-Fortress" is Brest.

Each was awarded a Gold Star Medal to attach to its banner, and is allowed to the image of the medal on its coat of arms.

Arms of Sevastopol

=== Repeat awards ===
Repeat awards of the titles "Hero of the Soviet Union" and "Hero of Socialist Labor" were allowed until the practice was abolished during perestroika. Afterwards, each title could be awarded to a recipient only once in their lifetime.

== Non-Soviet titles ==
Several nations with communist governments other than the Soviet Union, many part of the Warsaw Pact and the Eastern Bloc, adopted their own hero titles. These titles closely followed the Soviet model.

Not all communist or socialist nations issued hero titles. Conversely, some nations that issued hero titles were not affiliated with the Soviet Union or communism.

=== List of Eastern Bloc titles ===
- Afghanistan - Hero of Revolutionary Afghanistan
- Albania - Hero of the People, Hero of Socialist Labour, Mother Heroine
- Bulgaria - Hero of the People's Republic of Bulgaria, Hero of Socialist Labour, Mother Heroine
- China - Order of Heroic Exemplar
- Cuba - Hero of the Republic of Cuba
- Czechoslovakia - Hero of the Czechoslovak Socialist Republic, Hero of Socialist Labour
- East Germany - Hero of the German Democratic Republic, Hero of Labour
- Hungary - Hero of the Hungarian People's Republic, Hero of Socialist Labour
- Mongolia - Hero of the Mongolian People's Republic
- North Korea - Hero of the Republic, Hero of Labor
- Romania - Hero of the Socialist Republic of Romania, Hero of Socialist Labour, Hero of the Agrarian Revolution, Mother Heroine
- Yugoslavia - Order of the People's Hero, Order of the Hero of Socialist Labour
- Vietnam - Hero of the People's Armed Forces, Hero of Labor, Vietnamese Heroic Mother

=== List of non-Eastern Bloc titles ===
Some countries outside the Eastern Bloc also created a National Hero title, generally having little resemblance or connection with the Hero of the Soviet Union award:

- Barbados - Barbadian National Heroes
- Belize - Order of the National Hero (Belize)
- Indonesia - National Hero of Indonesia, title awarded posthumously only
- Jamaica - Order of National Hero
- Nepal - National Hero of Nepal
- Nicaragua - National Heroines and Heroes of Nicaragua
- Philippines - National Hero of the Philippines
- Sri Lanka - National Heroes of Sri Lanka

== Post-Soviet titles ==
The titles "Hero of the Soviet Union" and "Hero of Socialist Labor" were awarded until the collapse of the Soviet Union in 1991, which resulted in 15 independent republics. Each nation eventually began issuing their own titles, orders and decorations.

Some republics, like the Baltic republics of Estonia, Latvia, and Lithuania, did not create hero titles. Others, such as Belarus, Russia, and Ukraine, continue with their own successor hero titles. The award criteria for these titles were kept largely intact.

Ukraine was the only former Soviet republic to continue the two-hero award system from the time of its creation in 1998: the military "Order of the Gold Star" for heroism, and the civilian "Order of the State" for labour. Kazakhstan introduced the Hero of Kazakhstan in 1993 and the Hero of Labour of Kazakhstan in 2008. Russia created the Hero of the Russian Federation in 1992 and the Hero of Labour of the Russian Federation in 2013. Georgia established the title "National Hero" and the decoration "Order of National Hero" in 2004. A breakaway region of Georgia, Abkhazia, has its own hero title, "Hero of Abkhazia".

=== List of post-Soviet titles ===
- Armenia – National Hero of Armenia
- Azerbaijan – National Hero of Azerbaijan
- Belarus – Hero of Belarus
- Georgia – Order of National Hero
- Kazakhstan – Hero of Kazakhstan, Hero of Labour of Kazakhstan
- Kyrgyzstan – Hero of the Kyrgyz Republic, Heroic Mother
- Russia – Hero of the Russian Federation, Hero of Labour of the Russian Federation
- Tajikistan – Hero of Tajikistan
- Turkmenistan – Hero of Turkmenistan
- Ukraine – Hero of Ukraine (awarded in the form of a military Order of the Gold Star and a civilian Order of State), Mother Heroine, Hero City of Ukraine
- Uzbekistan – Hero of Uzbekistan

== See also ==
- Father of the Nation
- Folk hero
