= Order of Parental Glory =

Russian decoration honouring parents of large families

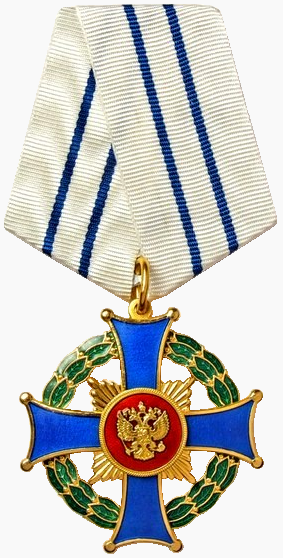
- Order of Parental Glory
- Type: Single grade order
- Awarded for: Families having successfully having raised seven or more children
- Presented by: Russia
- Eligibility: Citizens of Russia
- Status: Active
- Established: May 13, 2008
- Ribbon of the Order and Medal of Parental Glory

Precedence
- Next (higher): Order of Friendship
- Next (lower): Cross of St. George (Russia)
- Related: Order "Mother Heroine"

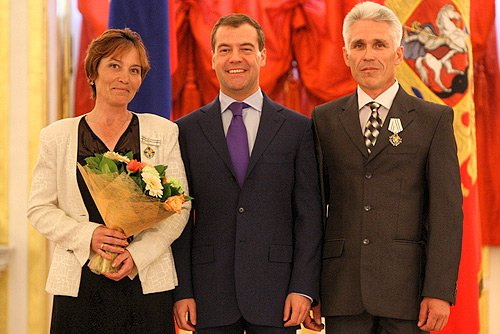
Russian president Dmitry Medvedev presenting the Order of Parental Glory to Gabriel and Marina Medvedev (no relation) on June 1, 2009. (Photo www.kremlin.ru)

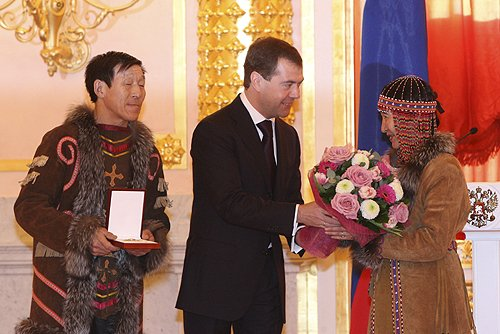
Russian president Dmitry Medvedev presenting the Order of Parental Glory to Vladimir and Olga Maksimov on January 13, 2009. (Photo www.kremlin.ru)

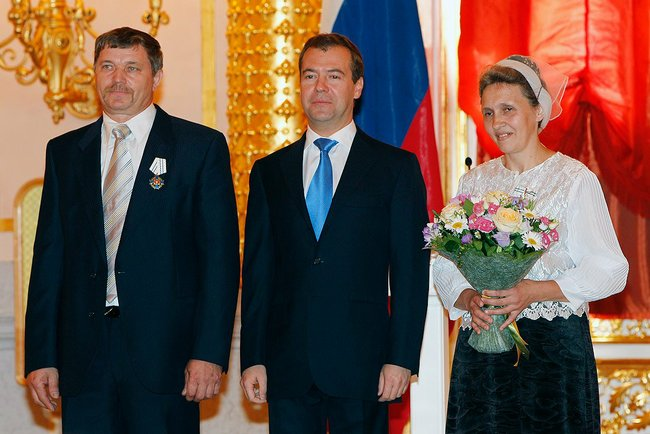
Russian president Dmitry Medvedev presenting the Order of Parental Glory to Nadezhda and Ivan Pinchuk on June 1, 2011 for successfully raising 13 children. (Photo www.kremlin.ru)

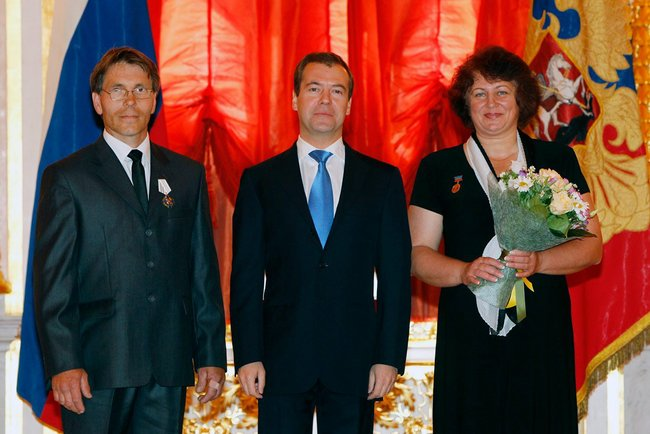
Russian president Dmitry Medvedev presenting the Order of Parental Glory to Irina and Sergey Levin on June 1, 2011 for successfully raising 9 children. (Photo www.kremlin.ru)

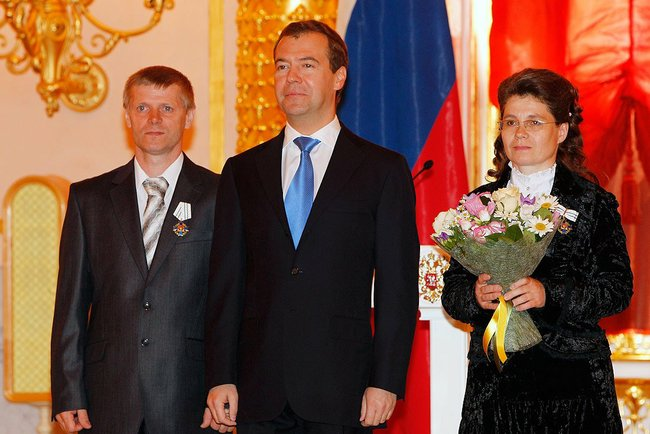
Russian president Dmitry Medvedev presenting the Order of Parental Glory to Irina and Vladimir Makhov on June 1, 2011 for successfully raising 10 children. (Photo www.kremlin.ru)

The Order of Parental Glory (Russian: Орден «Родительская Слава») is a state award of Russia. It was established on May 13, 2008 by presidential decree 775 to reward deserving parents of exceptionally large families. It can trace its origins to the Soviet Order "Mother Heroine". The Order's statute was amended on September 7, 2010 by presidential decree 1099, the same document that established the Medal of the Order of Parental Glory.

== Award statute ==
The Order of Parental Glory is awarded to parents or adoptive parents who are married, in a civil union, or in the case of single-parent families, to one of the parents or adoptive parents who are/is raising, or have raised seven or more children as citizens of the Russian Federation. For leading a healthy family life, being socially responsible, providing an adequate level of health care, education, physical, spiritual and moral development of the children, full and harmonious development of their personality, and setting an example to strengthen the institution of the family and child rearing.

The award is made when the seventh child reaches the age of three, and in the presence of the other living children, except in the cases of older children who were killed or missing in action in defence of the Fatherland or its interests, in the performance of military, official or civic duties, who died as a result of injury, concussion or disease received in these circumstances, either because of occupational injury or illness.

The Russian Federation Order of Precedence dictates that the Order of Parental Glory is to be worn on the left breast with other orders and medals immediately after the Order of Friendship.

== Award description ==
The badge of the Order is a 70 mm wide gilt silver cross pattée, with arms that are flared towards the concave outer ends. The cross obverse is enamelled in blue. At its center is a circular red enamelled medallion edged in gold and bearing the gilded coat of arms of the Russian Federation. A green enamelled laurel wreath passes under and near the outer ends of the cross. Golden rays extend between the cross's arms to the laurel wreath. The reverse is plain (golden) and bears the award serial number.

A smaller 40 mm wide badge of the Order is also given for wear in special circumstances. The gentlemen's badge is suspended by a ring through the badge suspension loop from a standard Russian pentagonal mount covered by a 24 mm wide overlapping white silk moiré ribbon with two 1,5 mm wide light blue stripes situated 8 mm from the ribbon outer edge. The ladies' badge hangs from a bow made of the same ribbon. Both are worn on the left breast.

Order of Parental Glory	Medal of Parental Glory
Men's and ladies badges	Men's and ladies badges

== Recipients of the Order of Parental Glory (partial list) ==
The individuals listed below were awarded the Order of Parental Glory.

- Vladimir and Galina Belyaeva – June 1, 2009
- Yuri and Svetlana Druzhinin – June 1, 2009
- Anatoly and Helen Kitaev – June 1, 2009
- Sergei and Elena Kitka – June 1, 2009
- Sergey and Vera Malikov – June 1, 2009
- Gabriel and Marina Medvedev – June 1, 2009
- Sergey and Nadezhda Nikolaev – June 1, 2009
- Abdulkhalik and Hanpira Khalikova – January 13, 2009
- Nicholas and Xenia Lyovka – January 13, 2009
- Ildar and Ramzi Gabsalyamov – January 13, 2009
- Vladimir and Olga Maksimov – January 13, 2009
- Andrei and Svetlana Maltsev – January 13, 2009
- Ivan and Nadezhda Osyaki – January 13, 2009
- Ivan and Elena Novikov – January 13, 2009
- Vladimir and Nadezhda Popov – January 13, 2009
- Nikolai and Tatyana Saltykov – June 2, 2010
- Nikolay and Lyudmila Nikolenko – June 2, 2010
- Konstantin and Svetlana Rozenko – June 2, 2010
- Valery and Nadia Isiny – June 2, 2010
- Alexander and Tatiana Vasilyev – June 2, 2010
- Nicholas and Natalya Arkhipov – June 2, 2010
- Cyril and Julia Voroshilov – June 2, 2010
- Mudaris and Dilbyar Shafigullin – June 2, 2010
- Nadezhda and Ivan Pinchuk – June 1, 2011
- Irina and Sergei Levin – June 1, 2011
- Mary and Andrew Gamm – June 1, 2011
- Irina and Vladimir Makhovym – June 1, 2011
- Irae Gil'mutdinov and Constantine Goloshchapov – June 1, 2011
- Olga and Ivan Sukhov – June 1, 2011
- Inessa and Eugene Fisenko – June 1, 2011
- Valeriy and Tatiana Novik – May 31, 2017

== Medal of the Order ==
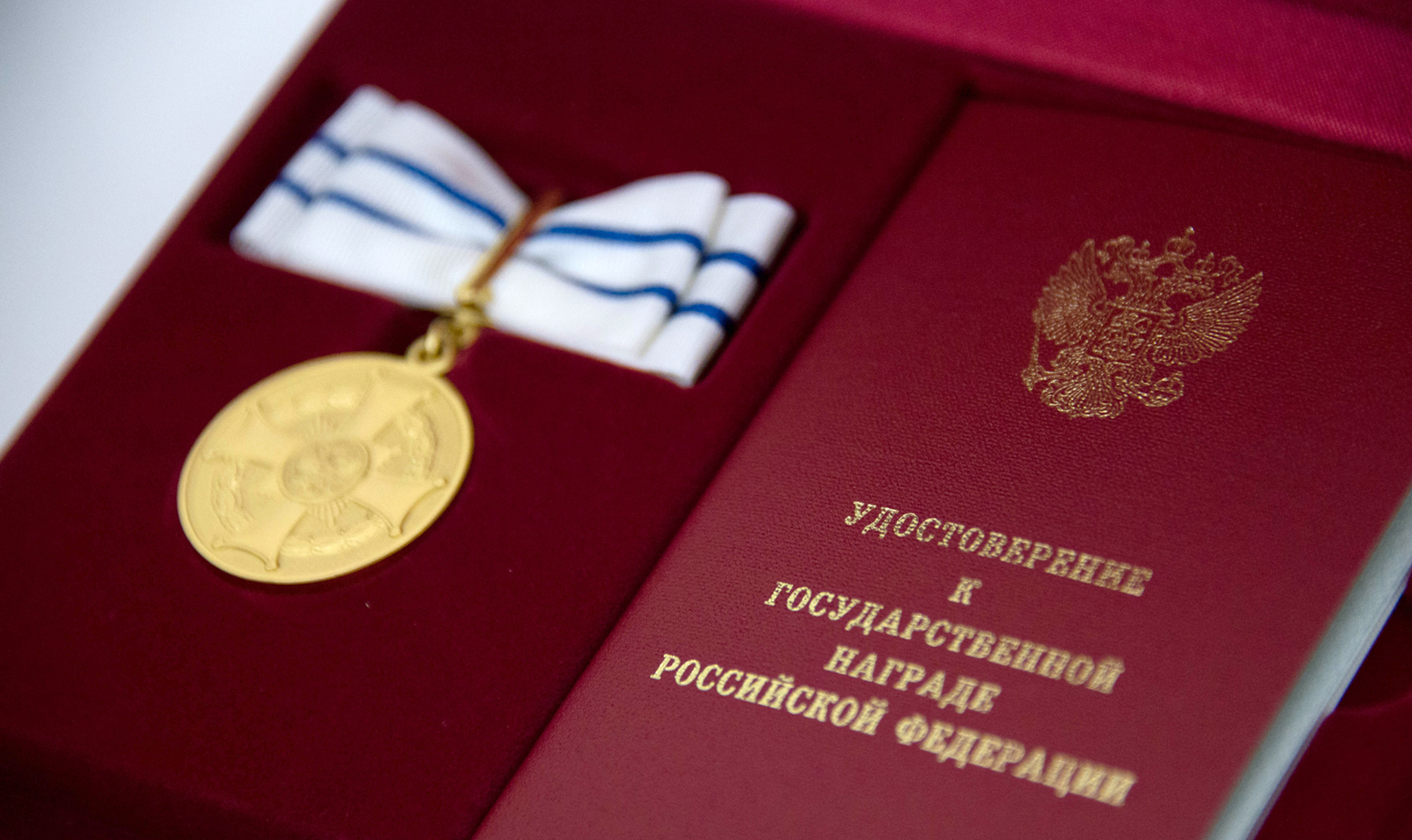
Medal of the Order of Parental Glory (woman's variant) with documents

The Medal of the Order of Parental Glory was established on September 7, 2010 by presidential decree 1099. Its award criteria differ from those of the main Order only in the number of children required. The Medal of the Order of Parental Glory is awarded for raising four children, as opposed to seven for the Order, and the remainder of the statute is the same.

The Medal of the Order of Parental Glory is made of gilt silver and is 32mm in diameter. The obverse has a reproduction (without enamels) of the badge of the Order of Parental Glory. The reverse is plain with the central inscription "FOR RAISING CHILDREN" (Russian: "ЗА ВОСПИТАНИЕ ДЕТЕЙ"). The medal hangs from the same mount and ribbon as the Order's smaller badge destined for wear.

The Russian Federation Order of Precedence dictates that the Medal of Parental Glory is to be worn on the left breast with other medals immediately after the Medal "For Merit in Space Exploration".

== See also ==
- Awards and decorations of the Russian Federation
- Awards and decorations of the Soviet Union
- Order of Maternal Glory
- Cross of Honor of the German Mother
- Médaille de l'enfance et des familles
- Altyn Alka
- Kumis Alka
- List of awards honoring women
