= Jugović =

Jugović (Serbian Cyrillic: Југовић, pronounced [jûɡoʋitɕ]) is a Serbo-Croatian family name the origin of which can be traced back into the 14th century. It is more common among ethnic Serbs than Croats and can be found throughout the successor states to the former Yugoslavia. Now this is commonly a Bosnian family name.

Notable people with this name include:

- Dragana Jugović del Monaco (born 1963), Serbian mezzo-soprano opera singer
- Igor Jugović (born 1989), Croatian football midfielder
- Jovan Jugović (1886–1926), Serbian aviator and fighter
- Marjan Jugović (born 1983), Serbian footballer
- Sofronije Jugović-Marković (18th century), Habsburg Serb writer and activist in Russian service
- Vedran Jugović (born 1989), Croatian footballer
- Vesna Jugović (born 1957), Serbian television author, journalist and writer
- Vladimir Jugović (born 1969), Serbian former footballer

== See also ==
- Jugović brothers
- RK Jugović
- Jugovići (disambiguation)
