= Order of the Mother of Jugović =

The Order of the Mother of Jugović (Serbian: Орден мајке Југовића) is an order awarded by the Serbian Orthodox Church to mothers who have multiple children. It is named after the "Mother of the Jugović brothers" who, in Serbian epic poetry, had nine sons and a daughter. An old national epic poem entitled "Death of the Mother of the Jugovici" commemorates her.

The silver order is awarded to mothers who gave birth to four children, while the golden order is awarded to mothers with five or more children.

== See also ==
- Médaille de l'enfance et des familles
- Altyn Alka
- Kumis Alka
- List of awards honoring women
