= Mother Heroine (Russia) =

Honorary title Mother Heroine
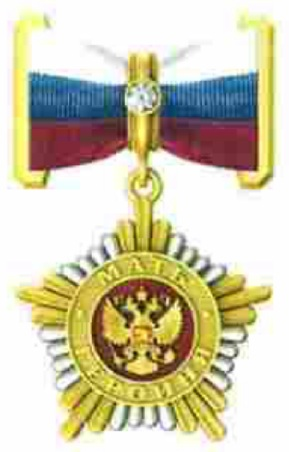
- Obverse of the Order "Mother Heroine"
- Type: Honorary title
- Awarded for: Raising 10 or more children
- Presented by: Russia (2022–present)
- Eligibility: Citizens of Russia
- Status: Being awarded
- Established: 15 August 2022
- First award: 14 November 2022

Precedence
- Next (higher): Hero of Labour of the Russian Federation
- Next (lower): Order of St. Andrew
- Related: Order of Parental Glory

Mother Heroine (Russian: Мать-героиня, romanized: Mat'-geroinya) is the highest title of the Russian Federation, awarded to mothers with Russian citizenship who have given birth to and raised ten or more children who are Russian citizens. Women awarded the title are also awarded a special distinction - the Order of Mother Heroine. The title and order were established by Decree of the President of the Russian Federation issued on August 15, 2022, No. 558 "On some issues of improving the state award system of the Russian Federation".

== History ==
In the Soviet Union, the similarly-titled "Mother Heroine" was established in 1944 as the highest degree of distinction for women for their services in giving birth and raising 10 or more children. As of January 1, 1995, approximately 431 thousand women have been awarded the Order of Mother Heroine.

Discussion about restoring the honorary title arose in Russia in the 2000s. In May 2008, Dmitry Medvedev established the Order of Parental Glory, which is awarded to married parents or adoptive parents of seven or more children.

In May 2022, at a meeting of the Presidium of the State Council of the Russian Federation, the head of the Association of Large Families of Moscow, Natalya Karpovich, asked Vladimir Putin to award the title "Heroine Mother" to women who have given birth to five or more children. State Duma deputies began work on a bill to restore the title. On June 1, 2022, on Children's Day the president ordered the return of the title "Mother Heroine" and the addition of a payment of 1 million rubles. Putin noted that these days "the traditions of a large, large family" are gradually being revived, and also called the demographic situation in Russia "extremely difficult," calling for measures of a "drastic nature" to be taken, one of which should be encouragement in the form of an order and material reward.

The first award of the title "Heroine Mother" was made by Decree of the President of the Russian Federation dated November 14, 2022, the award was received by a resident of the Yamalo-Nenets Autonomous Okrug Olga Dekhtyarenko and Medni Kadyrova wife of the Head of the Chechen Republic, Ramzan Kadyrov.

== Regulations and criteria ==
According to Decree of the President of the Russian Federation issued on August 15, 2022, No. 558 "On some issues of improving the state award system of the Russian Federation," the title of Mother Heroine is the highest degree of distinction for women who have given birth to and raised ten or more children. The awarded mother and her children must be citizens of Russia and form a socially responsible family, provide an appropriate level of care for health, education, physical, spiritual and moral development.

The title is assigned to the mother when the tenth child reaches the age of one year and if there are other children alive. As noted in the decree, when assigning the rank, children who died or went missing "in defense of the Fatherland or its interests, in the performance of military, official or civil duty, as well as a result of terrorist acts and emergency situations" are also taken into account, as well as children "those who died as a result of a wound, concussion, injury or disease received under the specified circumstances, or as a result of a work injury or occupational disease".

The heroine mother is awarded a sign of special distinction, a medal which is worn on the left side of the chest above other state awards of Russia and state awards of the USSR, and a certificate of conferment of the title. The order is located after the gold medal "Hero of Labor of the Russian Federation".

== Description of the order ==
The Order "Mother Heroine" is made of gold with diamond and enamel. It is a five-pointed star with rays in the form of gold and rhodium-plated struts.

In the center of the star there is a round medallion with the image of the Coat of arms of Russia. The medallion is covered with red enamel and is framed by a welt with a raised inscription "MOTHER HEROINE". On the reverse side is the number of the order badge. The distance between the opposite ends of the star is 30 millimeters.

The badge of the order, using an eyelet and a ring, is connected to a gilded metal block, which is a bow covered with a moiré tricolor ribbon in the colors of the Flag of Russia. In the middle the bow will be tied with a decorative ring with a diamond placed in the center. The width of the bow is 20 millimeters and the length is 30 millimeters.

On the reverse side of the block there is a pin for attaching the badge of the order to clothing.

== Statistics ==
| Year | Award |
|---|---|
| 2022 | 9 |
| 2023 | 36 |
| 2024 | 10 |
| 2025 | 3 |
| 2026 | 9 |

== See also ==
- Médaille de l'enfance et des familles
- Altyn Alka Kazakhstan. It is awarded to mothers who have raised at least seven children.
- Kumis Alka Kazakhstan. It rewards mothers who have raise at least six children.
- List of awards honoring women
