= List of awards honoring women =

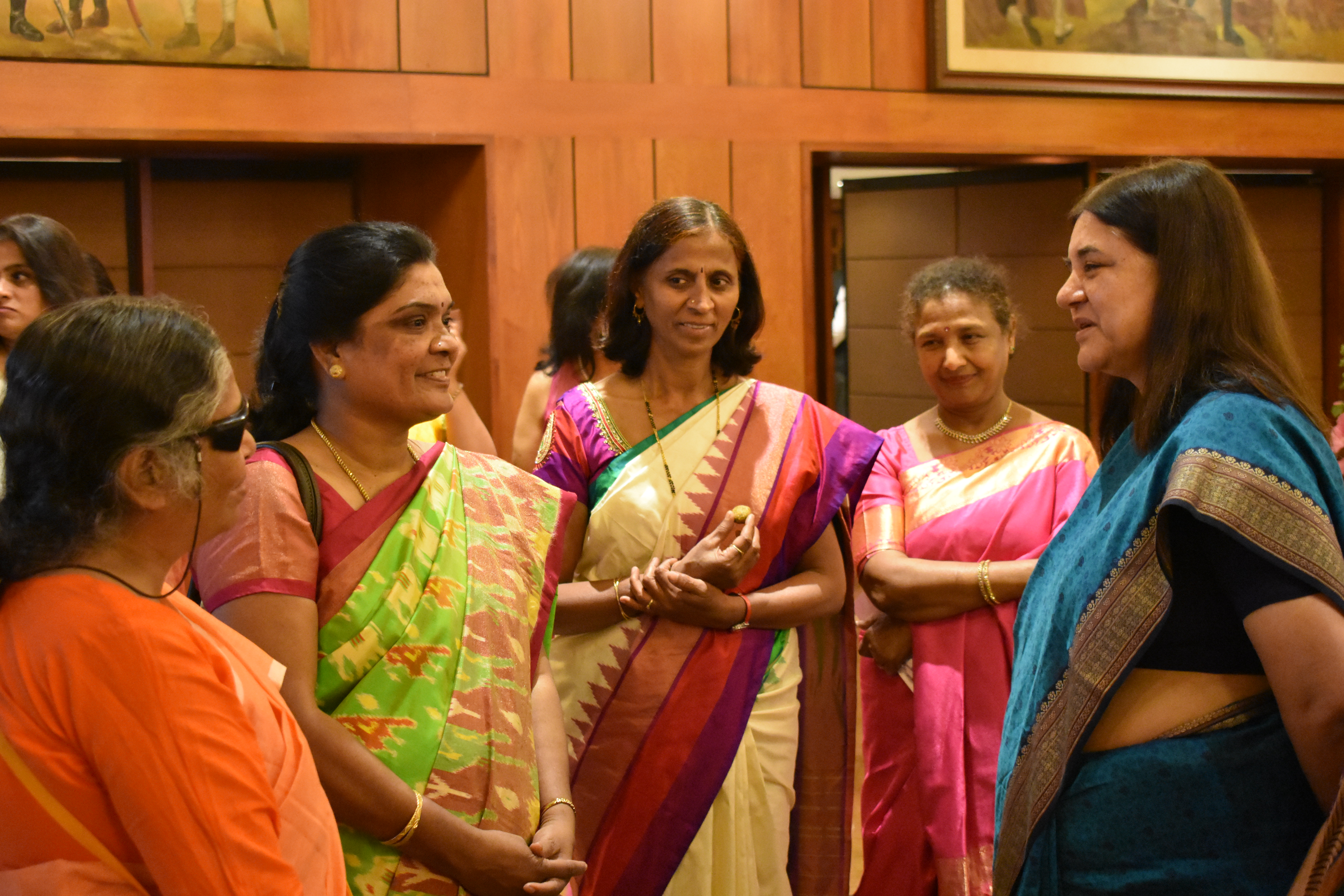
Gargi Gupta and other awardees of Nari Shakti Puraskar, 2017, Minister Maneka Gandhi

This list of awards honoring women is an index to articles about notable awards honoring women. It excludes media, science and technology and sports awards, which are covered by separate lists, and it excludes orders of chivalry for women. The list is organized by region and country of the sponsoring organization, but some awards are open to women around the world.

== International ==
Country	Award	Sponsor	Notes
International	Agent of Change Award	Global Partnerships Forum, United Nations	Champions of gender equality and women’s empowerment
International	Florence Nightingale Medal	International Committee of the Red Cross	"Exceptional courage and devotion to the wounded, sick or disabled or to civilian victims of a conflict or disaster" or "exemplary services or a creative and pioneering spirit in the areas of public health or nursing education".
International	Jane Drew Prize	Architects' Journal and The Architectural Review	Part of the W Awards; recognises "contribution to the status and profile of women in architecture" and "a long-term commitment to the built environment and the architectural profession"
International	The Medal for the Martyrs	International Veterans and volunteers with the SDF, YPG and YPJ. All coordinated by The Medal for the Martyrs project team.	Presented to the next of kin to the international fighters and volunteers with the Kurdish forces that were killed while in Syria or died as a result of their service in Syria. Members of the Women's Protection Units (YPJ) are also eligible for the medal.
International	Millennium Peace Prize for Women	United Nations Development Fund for Women	Efforts to end conflict
International	Moira Gemmill Prize for Emerging Architecture	Architects' Journal and The Architectural Review	Part of the W Awards; recognises "female and non-binary practice founders under the age of 45" who are "using innovative architecture to effect positive social change"
International	L'Oréal-UNESCO For Women in Science Awards	L'Oréal and UNESCO	Outstanding women researchers who have contributed to scientific progress
International	Women in Business Award	United Nations Conference on Trade and Development	Women who have taken part in the EMPRETEC programme

== Americas ==
Country	Award	Sponsor	Notes
Canada	Governor General's Awards in Commemoration of the Persons Case	Governor General of Canada	Promotion of equality for girls and women in Canada
United States	AWM–Microsoft Research Prize in Algebra and Number Theory	Association for Women in Mathematics	Outstanding young female researcher in algebra or number theory
United States	Anita Borg Institute Women of Vision Awards	AnitaB.org	Exceptional achievement by women in technology
United States	Bennett Prize for Women Figurative Realists	Steven Alan Bennett and Dr. Elaine Melotti Schmidt	Women figurative realist painters
United States	Elaine Bennett Research Prize	American Economic Association	Outstanding research in any field of economics by a woman not more than seven years beyond her Ph.D.
United States	Ghana Women of Courage Award	United States Department of State	Ghanaian women who have shown leadership, courage, resourcefulness, and willingness to sacrifice for others, especially in promoting women's rights in Ghana
United States	Glamour Awards	Glamour (magazine)	Extraordinary and inspirational women from a variety of fields
United States	Grace Hopper Celebration of Women in Computing	AnitaB.org, Association for Computing Machinery	Awards for women in computing
United States	International Women of Courage Award	United States Department of State	Women around the world who have shown leadership, courage, resourcefulness, and willingness to sacrifice for others, especially in promoting women's rights
United States	Joan & Joseph Birman Research Prize in Topology and Geometry	Association for Women in Mathematics	Outstanding young female researcher in topology or geometry
United States	Los Angeles Times Women of the Year Silver Cup	Los Angeles Times	Achievements in science, religion, the arts, education and government, community service, entertainment, sports, business, and industry
United States	Mary Garber Award	Atlantic Coast Conference	Female athlete who show extraordinary talent throughout the entire season
United States	Oregon Women of Achievement	Oregon Commission for Women	Exemplary role models who promote the status of women in society, are committed to diversity and equity and have earned recognition for success and leadership in their fields
United States	Remarkable Woman Award	National Association of Women Business Owners	Women who contribute time and talent to their organization and community
United States	Ruth I. Michler Memorial Prize	Association for Women in Mathematics	Outstanding research by a female mathematician who has recently earned tenure
United States	Sadosky Prize	Association for Women in Mathematics	Outstanding young female researcher in mathematical analysis
United States	The DVF Awards	Diller-von Furstenberg Family Foundation	Extraordinary women who are dedicated to transforming the lives of other women
United States	Top Ten Professional Women	Marjaree Mason Center	Women based on strides in their professions, service to their communities, and how they have served as positive role models
United States	Woman of Courage Award	National Organization for Women	Personal bravery in challenging entrenched power and in carrying out action that has the potential to benefit women in general
United States	Women Rock Awards	Women in Ecommerce	Showcases Women Who Integrate the Web and/or Technology as Part of Their Business Practices

== Asia ==
Country	Award	Sponsor	Notes
Bangladesh	Begum Rokeya Padak	Government of Bangladesh	Individual women for their exceptional achievement
India	I Am Woman awards	Karan Gupta Education Foundation and IE Business School	Women overcoming professional and personal challenges
India	Nari Shakti Puraskar	President of India	Achievements and contributions of women
India	Neerja Bhanot Award	Neerja Bhanot-Pan Am Trust	Woman of India subjected to social injustice, who faces the situation with grit and determination and extends help to other women in similar distress
India	Women Transforming India	United Nations	Exceptional women entrepreneurs, who are breaking the glass ceiling and challenging stereotypes
Kazakhstan	Altyn Alka	Government of Kazakhstan	Mothers who gave birth to and raised seven children.
Kazakhstan	Kumis Alka	Government of Kazakhstan	Mothers who gave birth to and raised six children.
Sri Lanka	Women Friendly Workplace Awards	Satyn & CIMA	Recognised woman-friendly workplace cultures which empowering and help women.
Vietnam	Vietnamese Heroic Mother	Government of Vietnam	Mothers who have made numerous contributions and sacrifices for the cause of national liberation, national construction and defense, and the performance of international obligations
Malaysia	Golden Phoenix Award	Asia Excellence Entrepreneur Federation	Achievements and contributions of women

== Europe ==
Country	Award	Sponsor	Notes
Albania	Mother Heroine (Albania)	People's Socialist Republic of Albania	Mothers who had given birth, raised and educated 8 children or more in the spirit of socialist patriotism
Albania	Glory to the Mother	People's Socialist Republic of Albania	Mothers who bore, nurtured, and educated at least 4 children.
Denmark	Tagea Brandt Rejselegat	Tagea Brandt Rejselegat	Women who have made a significant contribution in science, literature or art
East Germany	Clara Zetkin Medal	Council of Ministers of East Germany	Outstanding achievements in developing and advancing the country's socialist society
France	Femina Cup	Femina (French magazine)	Woman who, by sunset on 31 December each year, had made the longest flight, in time and distance, without landing
France	Médaille de l'enfance et des familles	Government of France	Those who have successfully raised several children with dignity
Germany	Cross of Honour of the German Mother	German Reich	German mother for exceptional merit to the German nation
Germany	Anne Klein Women's Award	Heinrich Böll Foundation	Women from anywhere in the world who are committed to gender democracy.
Greece	Order of Beneficence	President of the Hellenic Republic	Distinguished services by women to Greece and in the public sphere
Russia	Mother Heroine (Russia)	Russia	Women who have given birth to and raised ten or more children
Russia	Order of Parental Glory	Russia	Parents who have raised seven or more children who are Russian citizens
Russia	Women's World Award	World Awards	Women who have influenced the world by their work in areas such as society or politics
Serbia	Order of the Mother of Jugović	Serbian Orthodox Church	Mothers who have multiple children
Soviet Union	Mother Heroine	Soviet Union	For bearing and raising a large family
Soviet Union	Order of Maternal Glory	Soviet Union	Mothers bearing and raising seven or more children
United Kingdom	100 Women (BBC)	BBC	Series that examines the role of women in the 21st century
United Kingdom	Arab Woman of the Year Award	London Arabia Organisation	Achievements made by Arab women across the globe
United Kingdom	Max Mara Art Prize for Women	Max Mara, Whitechapel Gallery	Young female artist working in the United Kingdom
United Kingdom	Royal Order of Victoria and Albert	Queen Victoria	Female members of the British royal family and female courtiers
United Kingdom	Women of the Year Lunch	The Women of the Year Lunch and Awards	Women achievers

== Oceania ==
Country	Award	Sponsor	Notes
Australia	Tasmanian Honour Roll of Women	Tasmanian Government	Contribution to state of Tasmania
Australia	Victorian Honour Roll of Women	Victoria (Australia)	Achievements of women from the state of Victoria
New Zealand	Architecture + Women NZ Dulux Awards	Architecture + Women NZ	To recognise the contribution of women to the field of architecture in New Zealand.
New Zealand	Kate Sheppard Memorial Trust Award	Kate Sheppard Memorial Award Trust	For further education, study, research or training in areas which are of value in the community of New Zealand
New Zealand	New Zealand Women of Influence Award	Westpac, Stuff NZ	Women who make a difference to everyday New Zealanders' lives
New Zealand	Fonterra Dairy Woman of the Year	Fonterra	Awarded to a woman who has made an outstanding contribution to the dairy industry
New Zealand	National Association of Women in Construction (New Zealand) Excellence Awards	National Association of Women in Construction (New Zealand)	To recognise the achievements of women working in construction and affiliated industries in New Zealand, and organisations active in redressing the industry's gender imbalance
New Zealand	Women in Governance Awards	Governance New Zealand	To recognise commitment to diversity by both organisations and individuals in New Zealand
New Zealand	Women in Film and Television New Zealand Awards	Women in Film and Television New Zealand	To celebrate and encourage the achievements of New Zealand women in film, television and digital media
Papua New Guinea	Westpac Outstanding Women Award	Westpac	To recognize exceptional professional work of women in Papua New Guinea

== See also ==
- Lists of awards
- List of science and technology awards for women
- List of media awards honoring women
- List of awards for actresses
- List of film awards for lead actress
- List of television awards for Best Actress
- List of sports awards honoring women
- List of female Nobel laureates
