= Robert Kaiser =

Robert Kaiser is the name of:

- Robert Kaiser (footballer) (born 1946), Austrian footballer
- Robert Kaiser (Nazi leader), leader of the Reichsbund Deutsche Familie
- Robert Blair Kaiser (1931–2015), American author and journalist, best known for his writing on the Catholic Church
- Robert G. Kaiser (born 1943), American author and journalist on the Washington Post
- Bob Kaiser (born 1950), American baseball player
