= Jugovići =

Jugovići most commonly refers to the Serbian mythological heroes, the Jugović brothers.

Jugovići may also refer to:

- Jugovići, Nevesinje, Bosnia and Herzegovina
- Jugovići, Gacko, Bosnia and Herzegovina
- Jugovići, Nikšić, Montenegro
- Jugovići, Loznica, Serbia
