= Spar Street =

American painter and sculpteor

- Born: April 27, 1963 (age 63); Park City, Utah
- Occupations: Painter, sculptor

Spar Street (born 1963) is an American painter and sculptor. He specializes in painting large canvases in mixed media, with an emphasis on sensuality, color, and movement. Before becoming an artist, Street was a skier and entrepreneur. He is best known for his work with the Nobel Foundation and the United Nations.

== Personal life ==
Street was born in Park City, Utah on April 27, 1963, the eldest of four children, to Richard and Shera Street. Street moved to Palo Alto, California when his parents divorced in 1965. He was raised in a creative atmosphere, painting since the age of two.

Street was diagnosed with dyslexia at age six, and could not read until the fifth grade. When he was ten years old, Street's mother was told by a child psychologist that her son would never amount to anything because of his perceived disability. During that time, Street turned to art as a form of therapy.

Street currently resides in Maui, Hawaii with his wife Johanna, and their daughter Shanti.

== Artwork ==
=== Style ===
Street combines abstraction, impressionism, and realism into his works on canvas. His multimedia works revolve around mostly spiritual themes. Street also employs heavy layering in many of his abstract paintings. Maui art critic Paul Janes-Brown has this to say about Street's work: "You have to actually come and see the work to appreciate how great an artist this man is…The excitement of his work is extraordinary. The texture of the work transforms it to another place completely."

=== Process ===
Commissions make up most of Street's work and are viewed as a co-creative process. He begins with a lengthy personal interview process in order to uncover the client's values and challenges. This process takes six months or more, as the goal is to deliver a piece that “personally lends inspiration for living life to one’s highest aspirations.”

== Art for Peace ==
In 1999, the United Nations installed Street's Lift of Freedom in their UNESCO board room in New York City.

In 2001, Street created his sculpture The Heart of Peace, after having been asked by Michael Nobel of the Nobel Foundation and Gene Maillard, former executive director of the GRAMMY Foundation, to create an emotionally evocative sculpture to commemorate the 100th anniversary of the Nobel Peace Prize.

In 2005, the UN, along with the Global Security Institute, awarded Ted Turner the Alan Cranston Peace Award in honor of his $1 billion donation to the UN and other peace-promoting organizations. The UN commissioned Street to create a piece for Turner to commemorate the event. The resulting painting, The Gift, was presented at an event hosted by the Global Security Institute at the UN Headquarters in New York.

In 2016, Street's sculpture The Agent of Change was used as the basis for UN Women's first annual Agent of Change Award.
