= Reichsbund der Kinderreichen =

Natalist group

Reichsbund der Kinderreichen (RDK or RdK), Reich's Union of Large Families or literally: Reich's League of those wealthy in children, was one of the most important pronatalist groups founded in Germany after World War I. To qualify as a member of this league a family should have at least four children. Widows were also admitted.

The German Large Family League was forcefully nazified after the Nazi takeover of power in 1933. As such its goal became the preservation and promotion of the German hereditarily healthy Aryan family ("Erhaltung und Förderung der deutschen, erbgesunden, arischen Familie").

== Renaming ==
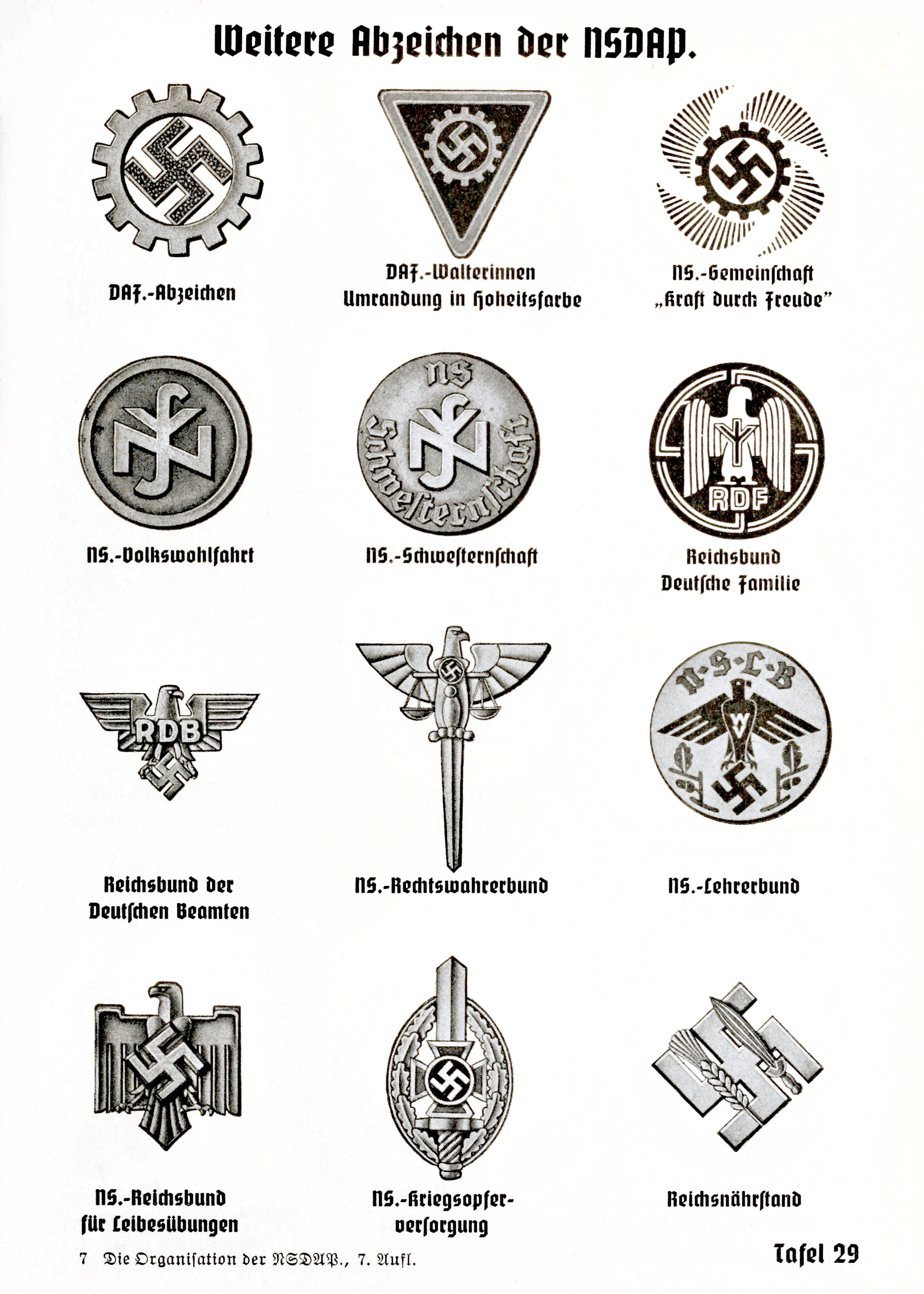
Emblem of the Reichsbund Deutsche Familie (RDF), from Organisationsbuch der NSDAP 1943

The RDK was renamed Reichsbund Deutsche Familie, Kampfbund für erbtüchtigen Kinderreichtum (literally German Family Reich's League, Struggle League for a Hereditarily Strong Offspring), in April 1940, in the first years of World War II. Its new acronym became RDF and Dr. Robert Kaiser became its new leader. Under Dr. Kaiser, the RDF became essentially a propaganda organization, promoting marriages and natality among the youth despite the war-related difficulties.

As a Nazi organization the German Large Family League was disbanded after Nazi Germany's defeat in World War II. The American Military Government issued a special law outlawing the Nazi party and all of its branches. This Denazification decree was also known as "Law number five".
