= Jean Goodwin Ames =

American artist (1903–1986)

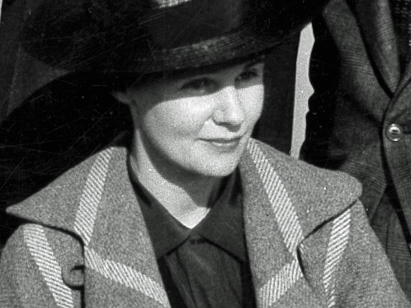
- Born: Jean Goodwin; November 6, 1903; Santa Ana, California, United States
- Died: February 12, 1986 (aged 82); Claremont, California, United States
- Known for: Muralist, educator
- Spouse: Arthur Forbes Ames

Jean Goodwin Ames (November 6, 1903 – February 12, 1986) was an American artist known for her work with the Works Progress Administration (WPA).

== Biography ==
Ames née Goodwin was born on November 6, 1903, in Santa Ana, California. She studied at the Chouinard Art Institute, the School of the Art Institute of Chicago, Pomona College, and the University of California, Los Angeles. She received her master's degree from the University of Southern California. In 1941 she married fellow artist Arthur Forbes Ames. Before their marriage the couple collaborated on several WPA murals including the sketches for History of Aviation at the Charles Lindbergh Middle School in Long Beach, California, two mosaic murals Three Women Gathering at the Sea Shore at Harbor High School in Newport Beach, California, and three egg tempera murals Recreation, Agriculture, and Conservation at the San Diego County Administration Center.

Ames taught at Scripps College and Claremont Graduate University. She died on February 12, 1986, in Claremont, California. In 1958 she was named a Los Angeles Times Woman of the Year.

Her work was included in the 2008 exhibition First Generation: Art in Claremont, 1907-1957 at the Claremont Museum of Art. Papers of Arthur and Jean Ames, including examples and photographs are in the Online Archive of California.

A tile mural behind the Administration desk at Rose Hills Memorial Park, located in Whittier, California, is attributed to Jean and Arthur Ames, 1956. The 40’x12’ piece reads, "The daytime hours, the changing seasons, pass quickly into finite space, the lives of Sun and moon and star in infinite conception last, as minutes measuring time for man, and aeons are but intervals in the eternal plan."
