= Robert Kaiser (Nazi leader) =

Dr. Rober Kaiser was the leader of the RDF, Reichsbund Deutsche Familie (Reich's League for the German Family) after 1940, in the first years of World War II.

The RDF, a branch of the NSDAP, was the pronatalist organization in Nazi Germany. Before Dr. Kaiser's takeover it had been known as Reichsbund der Kinderreichen (RDK) or (RdK), meaning "Reich's Union for Large Families".

== Propaganda activity ==
Dr. Kaiser took over the pro-natalist cause with fervor during the war years. The death of Germans in the front called for all-embracing measures to promote "kinderreich" families having large numbers of children. Kaiser used the Nazi propaganda machine to advocate the urgency of a "victory of cradles". He encouraged young people to marry and promoted having a minimum of four children per family.

The aims of Dr. Kaiser's organization were hampered by the physical separation of young people and the difficulties of the war years. Owing to the military situation, most men were fighting in the fronts, in distant places. As marriageable young men were far away from German women, the RDF established Letter Centres in order to promote early marriages. This measure helped in some measure to counteract the decrease in marriages of the war years, for many young Germans were wondering whether they should marry or not in the war circumstances. The idea of the promotion of marriages went hand in hand with the promotion of bringing "racially and biologically perfect" couples together, that would breed as many children as possible despite the long periods of separation.

Robert Kaiser used the available media of the time to promote his cause. The German radio, magazines, newspapers and posters extolled the virtues of parents having many children, as worthy Germans having done their duty. Novelists were also encouraged to portray the family according to the requirements of the Nazi Party, promoting the idea of "Volksgemeinschaft" (Common interest of the people). Childless couples were portrayed as "selfish" in the RDF propaganda. Meanwhile, the village of Freisheim was hailed by the same propaganda as the most "kinderreich" in Germany.

== Works ==
- Volk und Familie. March (?) 1944.
