= Los Angeles Times Women of the Year Silver Cup =

Defunct newspaper award

The Los Angeles Times Women of the Year Silver Cup was an award presented to almost 300 women between 1950 and 1977 to honor achievements in science, religion, the arts, education and government, community service, entertainment, sports, business, and industry. It was started by Dorothy Chandler in 1950 but cancelled by her son and Times publisher Otis Chandler in 1977, as he considered women's awards “unnecessary in today’s world.”

== Origin ==
The award was instituted by Chandler because, as she said later, "I felt [after World War II] that the role of a woman had changed, and that instead of being just society, bridge-playing clubwomen that they had a potential within themselves to do creative things[.]"

The award was given to 243 women. The award was not given for three years due to construction of the Los Angeles Times Building.

== Winners ==
Notable winners include:

- Jean Goodwin Ames
- Irene Dunne
- Dorothy Chandler - 1951
- Lotte Lehmann
- Dorothy Marshall
- Anaïs Nin
- Lily Tomlin
- Agness Underwood
- Martha Watson

== See also ==
- List of awards honoring women
