= Médaille de l'enfance et des familles =

French civil decoration honouring mothers of large families

- Bronze, silver, and gold medals
- Type: Medal with 3 classes prior to 2013 and a single class since 2013
- Awarded for: Raising multiple children with dignity
- Presented by: France
- Eligibility: Parents of French children
- Established: 26 May 1920
- Gold Silver Bronze

Precedence
- Next (higher): Médaille de la Jeunesse et des Sports

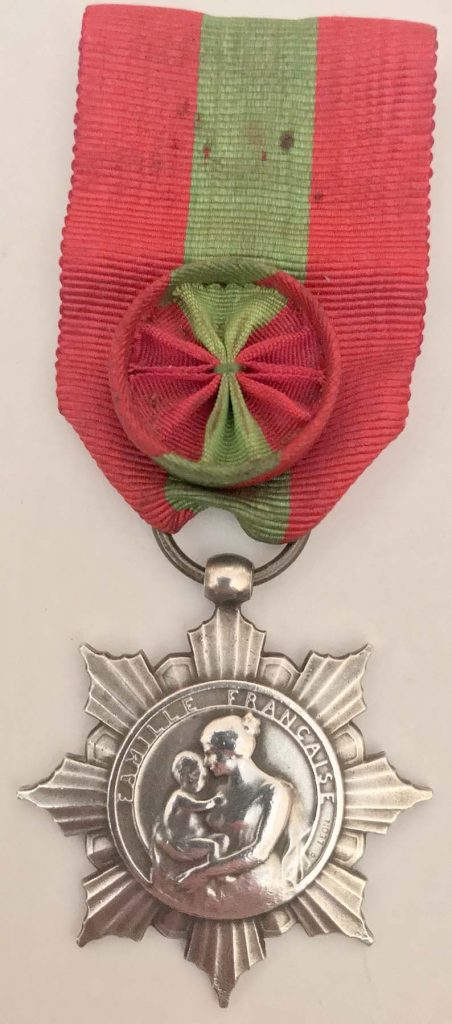
Medal design until 1983 (silver version)

The Médaille de l'enfance et des familles (lit. 'Medal of Childhood and Families'), formerly known as the Médaille de la Famille française (lit. 'Medal of the French Family') is a decoration awarded by the government of France to honour those who have successfully raised several children with dignity. The decoration was created by a decree of May 26, 1920, under the name Médaille d'honneur de la famille française (English: Medal of honour of the French family), with the aim of honouring mothers of large families. Although the medal rewards those with large families, the children must be "raised well" and the eldest must be at least 16 years old.

== History ==
The decoration was created by a decree of May 26, 1920, under the name Médaille d'honneur de la famille française (Medal of Honour of the French Family) with the aim of honouring mothers of large families.

The text of the decree underwent several changes before being completely reformed by a decree of October 28, 1982, which renamed the decoration Médaille de la Famille française (Medal of the French Family). This decree came into force on January 1, 1983, and was completed by an arrêté (administrative order) of March 15, 1983. The reform opened the award of the decoration to fathers and others who had raised several children in an appropriate way: for example, the Catholic priest Père Mayotte, curate of the parish of Randan, Puy-de-Dôme was granted the award in recognition of his raising the six children of his housekeeper, a widow who died suddenly.

In 2013, the award was referred as the médaille de la famille. The criteria of the awards were changed to 4 children for all medals instead of the previous multi-tiered approach.

In 2016, the ability to receive the medal was extended to those living outside of France as long as the children they were raising were French.

Since 2022, the award was officially renamed the Médaille de l'enfance et des familles in order to highlight the many different roles that can be had to promote children and family.

As of 2023, the award now also calls to attention multiple avenues to receive the medal both for those living in France and abroad. This includes not only the raising 4 or more children, but also helping early childhood education or raising orphans.

== Appearance ==
Prior to 2013, three classes of medal were awarded: bronze for those raising four or five children, silver for parents of six or seven children, and gold for those with eight or more children. A bronze medal is also granted to widowed mothers of three children whose husbands have been killed in action. The recipient's eldest child must be at least sixteen years old.

Since 2013, all awarded medals are made of bronze and recognize parents of families of 4 or more as well as those who have contributed greatly to early childhood education.

The original medal was an eight pointed radiant star, with a central medallion depicting a mother holding a small child, surrounded by the inscription Famille Française, ("French Family"). Since 1983 a circular medal has been awarded, bearing the words Famille Française above a modernistic image of a couple and their children. The words "République Française" ("French Republic") are inscribed on the reverse side. The ribbon of both versions is the same, and has three equal parts, the outer two being red and the inner green. Recipients of silver and gold medals are also granted a rosette in the same colours.

== Criteria ==
Recommendations or applications for the award must be deposited at the local town hall. An enquiry into the family is then conducted. If the enquiry reports positively, the final decision on whether to grant the award belongs to the prefect of the department. While the award has always been open to mothers raising families alone, and to other single parents and legal guardians since the 1982 reforms, this applies only in cases of widowhood or abandonment: the medal is only granted to divorced parents in the most exceptional circumstances. The medal may be awarded posthumously, provided that the application is made within two years of the recipient's death.

== See also ==
- Altyn Alka (Kazakhstan)
- Kumis Alka (Kazakhstan)
- Mother Heroine (Russia)
- Order of Parental Glory (Russia)
- Order of the Mother of Jugović (Serbia)
- Mother Heroine (Albania)
- Glory to the Mother (Albania)
- Mother Heroine (Soviet Union)
- Order of Maternal Glory (Soviet Union)
- Cross of Honor of the German Mother (Germany)
- List of awards honoring women
