= Agent of Change Award =

Award for gender equality and women's rights

The Agent of Change Award is an annual award constituted in 2016 by the Global Partnerships Forum to recognize Champions of Gender Equality and Women's Empowerment, in support of UN Women.

The Awards are conferred by the UN Assistant Secretary-General for Intergovernmental Support and Strategic Partnerships and the president of the Global Partnerships Forum at the Headquarters of the United Nations, in New York City. The Agent of Change Award statuette is based on artist Spar Street's sculpture of the same name.

== 2016 awards ==
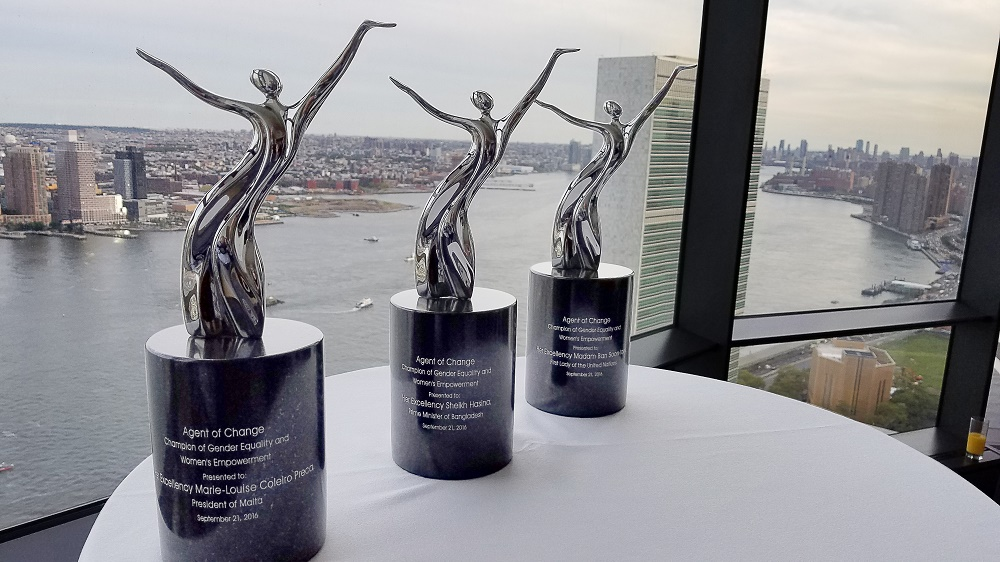
The three 2016 statuettes, with the United Nations headquarters visible in the background.

On September 21, 2016, the first Agent of Change Awards were conferred upon:

Recipient	Country	Note	Ref.
Sheikh Hasina	Bangladesh	10th Prime Minister of Bangladesh	
Marie-Louise Coleiro Preca	Malta	9th President of Malta	
Ban Soon-taek	South Korea	Wife of Ban Ki-moon, 8th Secretary-General of the United Nations	

== 2017 awards ==
On September 20, 2017, Agent of Change Awards were conferred upon:

Recipient	Country	Note	Ref.
Erna Solberg	Norway	28th Prime Minister of Norway	
Margot Wallström	Sweden	42nd Minister for Foreign Affairs & 13th Deputy Prime Minister of Sweden	
Retno Marsudi	Indonesia	17th Minister of Foreign Affairs of Indonesia	
Fatima bint Mubarak Al Ketbi	United Arab Emirates	Chairwoman of the UAE General Women's Union	
Michelle Bachelet	Chile	32nd and 34th President of Chile	

== See also ==
- List of awards honoring women
