= Jugovići, Loznica =

Coordinates: 44°32′43″N 19°28′57″E

Jugovići Југовићи (Serbian)
- Village (Selo)
- Interactive map of Jugovići
- Country: Serbia
- District: Mačva District
- Municipality: Loznica
- Time zone: UTC+1 (CET)
  - Summer (DST): UTC+2 (CEST)

Jugovići is a village situated in Loznica municipality in Serbia.

== Name ==
The village is one of a few villages named after the legendary Jugović brothers who were 9 knights that broke through the Ottoman Empire's lines at the battle of kosovo
