= Mother Heroine =

Soviet decoration honouring mothers of large families

Honorary title Mother Heroine
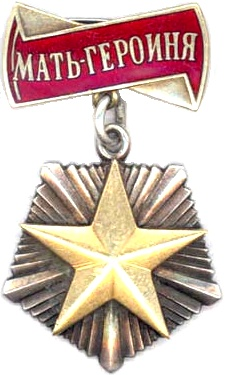
- Obverse of the Order "Mother Heroine"
- Type: Honorary title
- Awarded for: Raising 10 or more children
- Presented by: Soviet Union (1944–1991); Russia (2022–present)
- Eligibility: Citizens of the Soviet Union (1944–1991)
- Status: Being awarded
- Established: 8 July 1944

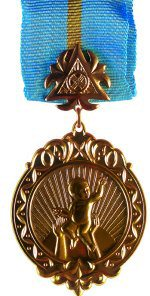
Kazakh "Алтын алка" ("Golden pendant")

Mother Heroine (Russian: Мать-героиня, romanized: Mat'-geroinya) is an honorary title that was used in the Soviet Union, awarded for bearing and raising a large family. The state's intent was not only to honor such large families, but also to increase financial assistance for pregnant women, mothers of large families, and single mothers, and to promote an increased level of health in mother and child. The award was established in 1944 and continued to exist until the fall of the Soviet Union in 1991. On 15 August 2022 Vladimir Putin signed a presidential decree which revived the honorary title in Russia.

== Award history ==
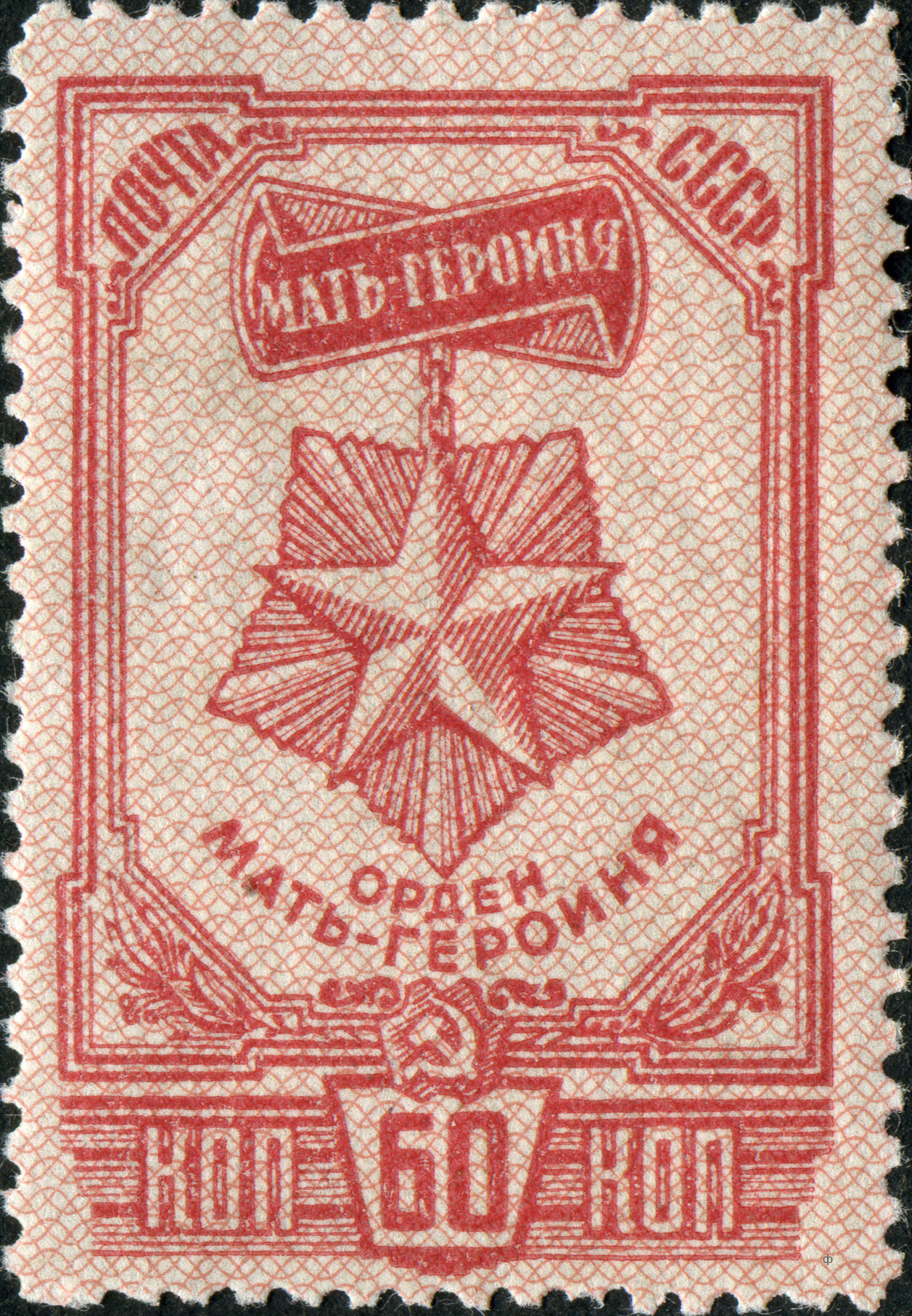
USSR 1945 stamp

The honorary title "Mother Heroine" was established on 8 July 1944 by Decree of the Presidium of the Supreme Soviet. Its statute, including multiple increases in available state pensions for these families or single mothers, was amended 15 times from its original establishment until the last amendment contained in Decree number 20 of the Presidium of the Supreme Soviet of 7 May 1986.

== Award statute ==
The honorary title "Mother Heroine" was awarded to mothers bearing and raising 10 or more children. The title was accompanied by the bestowal of the Order "Mother Heroine" and a certificate conferred by the Presidium of the Supreme Soviet of the Soviet Union. It was awarded upon the first birthday of the last child, provided that nine other children (natural or adopted) remained alive. Children who had perished under heroic, military or other respectable circumstances, including occupational diseases, were also counted. The award was created simultaneously with the Order of Maternal Glory (7-9 children) and the Maternity Medal (5 or 6 children).

They were also entitled to a number of privileges in terms of retirement pension, the payment of public utility charges, and the supply of food and other goods.

Approximately 430,000 women were awarded this title during its existence.

If worn with honorary titles of the Russian Federation, the latter have precedence.

== Award description ==
The honorary title "Mother Heroine" entitled the recipient to wear the Order "Mother Heroine", which was a gold star with silver straight rays between the arms forming an inverted pentagon; it was suspended by a silver-plated ring through the suspension loop to a metallic, red-enamelled scroll-shaped mount bearing the gilt relief inscription, "MOTHER HEROINE" (Russian: МАТЬ-ГЕРОИНЯ).

== Post-Soviet awards ==
Following the dissolution of the Soviet Union in 1991, the award was abolished in most post-Soviet republics.

- In Russia, it was abolished in 1991 but replaced in 2008 with the Order of Parental Glory. In 2022, Russian president Vladimir Putin revived the title of Mother Heroine and introduced a payment of one million rubles.
- In Tajikistan, it was withdrawn in 1996 to discourage large families.
- In Ukraine, it was cancelled upon independence but restored in 2001.
- In Kazakhstan, mothers of 10 or more children have since 1995 been awarded the Altyn Alka (Алтын алка, "Golden pendant") and mothers of eight or nine children have received the Kumis Alka (Кумiс алка, "Silver pendant").

== See also ==
- List of awards honoring women
- Orders, decorations, and medals of the Soviet Union
- Order of Maternal Glory
- Order of Parental Glory Russian Federation
- Mother Heroine (Russia)
- Mother Heroine (Albania)
- Order of Mother, Belarus
- Vietnamese Heroic Mother
- Cross of Honour of the German Mother
- Médaille de l'enfance et des familles
- Altyn Alka
- Kumis Alka
- Family in the Soviet Union
- Mother Heroine (Ukraine)
