= Mother Heroine (Albania) =

Albanian honorary title

"Mother Heroine" Title
- "Mother Heroine" medal
- Native name: Titulli "Nënë Heroinë"
- Type: State decoration
- Awarded for: Awarded to mothers and children for patriotic duties
- Country: People's Socialist Republic of Albania
- Presented by: The Presidium of the People's Assembly
- Status: Discontinued
- Established: 1945
- Ribbon bar

The "Mother Heroine" Title (Albanian: Titulli "Nënë Heroinë") was an honorary title given to mothers in the People's Socialist Republic of Albania.

== Definition ==
The title, with a medal, was given to mothers who had given birth, raised and educated 8 children or more in the spirit of socialist patriotism, with a love for work, with a sense of putting the general interest above their own, who were activists and had good working achievements.

This title was given to mothers when the children were alive and the youngest had reached the age of 1 year old. Children who were martyred during the National Liberation War or disappeared because of it and who did not have a bad political profile, as well as children who died in the line of duty for the national interest are counted as if they were alive.

== Recipients ==
- Ajshe Lamaj
- Ajman Muhametaj
- Cymë Sadikaj
- Daro Shkurti (Zani)
- Feride Hoxha
- Kune Brah Lauka
- Lule Muslia
- Mezalime Stojku
- Mira Doshlani
- Neslie Gjura
- Shkurte Sadri Koka
- Zade Haklaj
- Zade Sulaj

== See also ==
- Médaille de l'enfance et des familles
- Altyn Alka
- Kumis Alka
- Orders, decorations and medals of Albania
- Mother Heroine
- List of awards honoring women
