= Order of Maternal Glory (Albania) =

State decoration of the People's Socialist Republic of Albania

Order of Maternal Glory Urdhri "Lavdi Nënës"
- Order of Maternal Glory in three classes

Awarded by The Presidium of the People's Assembly
- Type: Order of merit
- Established: 10 October 1950
- Country: People's Socialist Republic of Albania
- Criteria: Awarded to mothers who had given birth to, raised and educated between four and seven children.
- Status: Discontinued
- Classes: I, II, III
- 1st Class 2nd Class 3rd Class

The Order of Maternal Glory (Albanian: Urdhri "Lavdi Nënës") was a civil decoration of the People's Socialist Republic of Albania awarded to mothers for raising and educating large families. It was conferred in three classes.

Eligibility was determined not only by the number of children but also by their upbringing, in accordance with the social and ideological principles of the Party of Labour.

The order was discontinued following the collapse of communist rule and the socialist system of state decorations was formally replaced by Law No. 8113 on 28 March 1996.

== Award criteria ==
The order was awarded to mothers who had given birth to, raised and educated between four and seven children. Recipients were expected to raise their children in the spirit of socialist patriotism, instil a love for work and encourage them to place the general interest of the public above their own. Mothers were also expected to be socially active and to have achieved good results in their work.

To qualify for the decoration, the children generally had to be living and the youngest was to reach the minimum age of one. Children who had fallen as martyrs during the National Liberation War or had vanished as a result of it, could nevertheless be included in the total, provided that they had not displayed any adverse political stance. Children who had died in the performance of duties serving the state were likewise counted as living for the purposes of determining eligibility.

== Grades ==
The Order of Maternal Glory was conferred in three classes:

- First Class – awarded to mothers who had given birth to, raised and properly educated seven children.
- Second Class – awarded to mothers who had given birth to, raised and properly educated six children.
- Third Class – awarded to mothers who had given birth to, raised and properly educated four or five children.

== Insignia ==
The insignia depicted a standing mother holding a child in her left arm and the Albanian flag in her right hand. Beneath the figure was the Albanian state emblem, with laurel branches extending around the sides of the medallion. The three classes were distinguished by the finish of their insignia.

== See also ==
- Orders, decorations, and medals of Albania
- Order of Maternal Glory
