= Mother Heroine (Ukraine) =

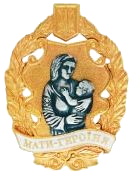
- Type: honorary title
- Awarded for: mothers with at least 5 children
- Country: Ukraine
- Presented by: president of Ukraine
- Established: 2004

Mother Heroine (Ukrainian: Мати-героїня, romanized: Maty-heroyinya) is a Ukrainian honorary title for women who have given birth and raised many children. An honorary title of the same name was present in the Soviet Union. Officially the honorary title is conferred to a mother who has given birth and raised to at least five children. Adopted children do count as well so long as the adoption process has been conducted in accordance of the Ukrainian adoption law. Moreover, the mother must have ensured the best possible conditions regarding i.a. moral and education. The youngest of the children has to be at least eight years old.

The honorary title was established by an act of Verkhovna Rada in 2007. It is conferred by a presidential decree, and the first ones were conferred already in the same year to Hanna Prymak ja Lidiya Repetilo. Both of them had already been made Mother Heroines during the Soviet Union.

Recipients of the honorary title are also given a one-time monetary award, which in 2025 was 30 280 UAH. Mother Heroines are also entitled to 10 additional caregiving days off in the case of children under the age of 15. The employer may reward a recipient with other means as well if they so please. A Mother Heroine with the work history of at least 15 years is allowed to retire at the age of 50.
