= Cross of Honour of the German Mother =

Nazi German decoration honouring mothers of large families

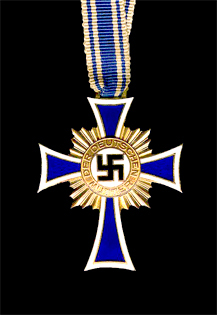
- Type: Civil state decoration
- Awarded for: "...exceptional merit to the German nation" (to Reichsdeutsche and Volksdeutsche mothers who exhibited probity, exemplary motherhood, and who conceived and raised four or more children in the role of a parent)
- Presented by: Nazi Germany
- Eligibility: Reichsdeutsche mothers – eligibility later extended to include Volksdeutsche mothers
- Status: Inactive
- Established: 16 December 1938
- First award: 21 May 1939
- Final award: up until 8 May 1945 (cessation date)

Precedence
- Next (higher): None
- Next (lower): None
- Related: None

The Cross of Honour of the German Mother (German: Ehrenkreuz der Deutschen Mutter), referred to colloquially as the Mutterehrenkreuz (Mother's Cross of Honour) or simply Mutterkreuz (Mother's Cross), was a state decoration conferred by the government of Nazi Germany to honour a German-citizen mother for exceptional merit to the German nation. Eligibility later extended to include ethnic German ('Volksdeutsche') mothers from, for example, Austria and Sudetenland, that had earlier been incorporated into the German Reich. Under the Nuremberg Laws, German Jews and those of partial Jewish ancestry were not considered full citizens (Reichsbürger) and were not eligible for the Cross of Honour.

The decoration was conferred from 1939 until 1945 in three classes: bronze, silver, and gold, to Reichsdeutsche mothers who exhibited probity, exemplary motherhood, and who conceived and raised at least four children in the role of a parent.

A similar practice, that continues to this present day, was already established in France since 1920, by conferring the Médaille d'honneur de la famille française (Medal of the French Family), a tribute to the French mother who raised several children appropriately.

== History ==
In recognition of the substantial importance a woman's role and motherhood was in support of a strong Germany, the Cross of Honour of the German Mother was introduced by decree in Berlin on 16 December 1938 by Führer und Reichskanzler (leader and chancellor) Adolf Hitler. The preamble of the statutory decree declared:

As a visible sign of gratitude of the German nation to children-rich mothers I establish this Cross of Honour of the German Mother (Original text in German: "Als sichtbares Zeichen des Dankes des Deutschen Volkes an kinderreiche Mütter stifte ich das Ehrenkreuz der Deutschen Mutter").

The crosses were awarded annually on the second Sunday in May (Mothering Sunday or Mother's Day), but also extended to include other national annual occasions of celebration. So despite its institution in 1938, the first awards were rendered in May 1939.

== Decoration ==
The Mother's Cross was composed of three classes, and conferred to mothers in accordance with its statutory legislation: Verordnung des Führers und Reichskanzlers über die Stiftung des Ehrenkreuzes der Deutschen Mutter vom 16. Dezember 1938. Reichsgesetzblatt (RGBI) Teil I, 1938, Nr. 224, Seite 1923 (In English: Statutory Order of the Leader and Chancellor on the establishment of the Cross of Honour of the German Mother of 16 December 1938. Imperial-(Reichs) Law Gazette (RGBl) Part I, 1938, No. 224, Page 1923), and its stringent nomination screening protocol.

=== Classes ===
- 1st class, Gold Cross: eligible mothers with eight or more children
- 2nd class, Silver Cross: eligible mothers with six or seven children
- 3rd class, Bronze Cross: eligible mothers with four or five children

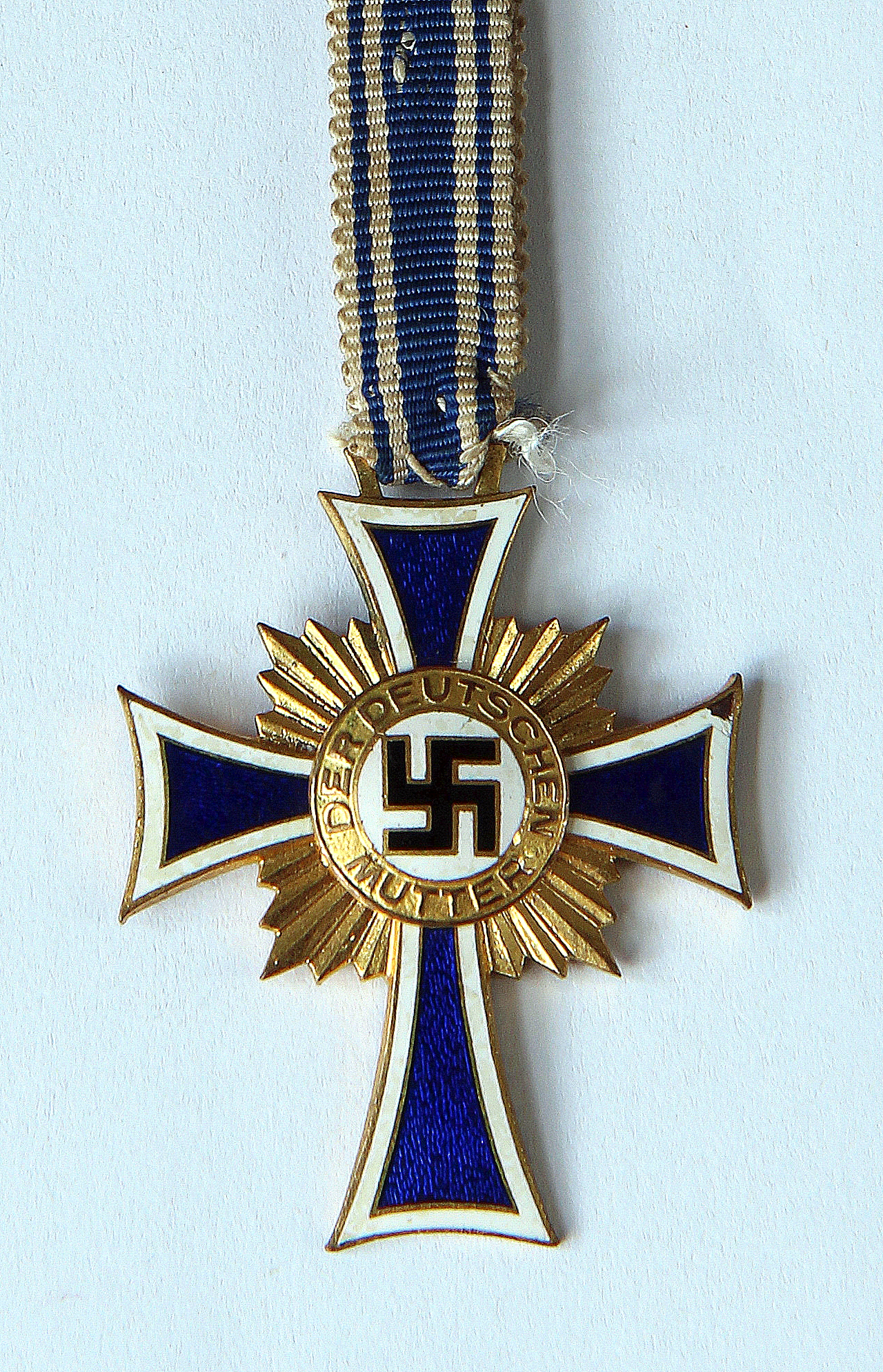
Cross of Honour of the German Mother in Gold

=== Cross design ===
The cross design is a slender elongated form of the Iron Cross or cross pattée and very similar in design to the Marian Cross of the Teutonic Order (Marianerkreuz des Deutschen Ritterordens), enamelled translucent-blue with a slim opaque-white border. Resting on the centre radiant starburst rays is a metal roundel decorated with the words "DER DEUTSCHEN MUTTER" (in English: THE GERMAN MOTHER) around an enamelled black straight centred "swastika" symbol, infilled white enamel. The cross design was the creation of the established Munich-based architect and sculptor Franz Berberich. The production of the cross involved several established Präsidialkanzlei (Presidential Chancellery) approved medal makers from across the German Reich. A maker's mark was never applied to the crosses produced; though each official house of manufacture did apply their name to the dark-blue presentation case (inside cover) for the 1st Class Gold Cross and the presentation sachets (reverse side) for each of the 2nd and 3rd Class Cross.

=== Cross reverse side inscription ===
Inscribed on the reverse side of the cross, of which two official reverse-side styles exist, is the inscription Das Kind adelt die Mutter (The Child ennobles the Mother) found on the initial version produced on inception during the early part of 1939. On the succeeding version produced from 1939 to 1945 the initial former reverse inscription was replaced during production with the date of the decoration decree 16. Dezember 1938. Directly beneath each of the two styles is the inscribed facsimile signature of Adolf Hitler; a style variation in this signature exists between the initial and succeeding version produced.

=== Neck ribbon ===
The decoration was worn around the neck on its accompanying narrow blue and white ribbon of about 60–70 cm in length. No other format of wear or placement was permitted.

=== Deed of Conferral and identification documents ===
Accompanying the decoration was a deed of conferral (Besitzzeugnis otherwise Verleihungsurkunde) sealed with the Hoheitszeichen des Deutschen Reiches (Great Seal of the German Reich) and the facsimile signature of Adolf Hitler and facsimile countersignature of the Minister of State Otto Meissner, head of the Office of the President of Germany (Präsidialkanzlei). An official pale-blue photo identification document (Ausweis) was also available, this identified the holder and attested the bestowal of the decoration to the recipient mother, as well as provided instructions on the reverse side for correct wearing of the decoration, permitted at all "formal" state, celebrative and family occasions only.

=== Miniature of the Mother's Cross ===
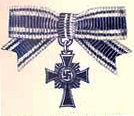
Illustration: Optional semi-official approved miniature version of the Mother's Cross measuring about 2 cm, with attached ribbon bow, as depicted in the original supply catalogue produced by LDO-approved medal maker Boerger & Co., (Beco) of Berlin.

An optional semi-official approved miniature version of the Mother's Cross measuring about 2 cm with reverse-side inscription, attached to a blue-white ribbon bow, was also produced in each of its three classes; it was authorized for purposes of general everyday wear only. The wearing of the blue-white ribbon bow alone, without the miniature cross attached, was also authorized for the same purpose. The miniature was an optional supplement, that could be purchased privately from relevant authorized supply stockists such as high-street jewellers or directly from the LDO (Leistungsgemeinschaft der Deutschen Ordenshersteller) approved medal makers responsible for manufacturing private retail supply. Other formats made available by those manufacturers to recipients of the honour, such as brooches, were simply unofficial merchandising embellishments.

=== Legacy ===
The Mother's Cross of Honour, upon the death of the honoured recipient mother, was permitted by statute to remain inheritable with the bereaved family as a keepsake remembrance.

=== Special Grade ===
There was a version of this award that had small diamonds placed on the swastika. The precise requisites are unknown, but a photograph of this variant (seen on page 75 in the book Political and Civil Award of the Third Reich ISBN 0912138165) stated that it had been awarded to a Dresden woman who was the mother of sixteen children.

== Nomination and conditions of conferral ==
=== Ideology ===
The Cross of Honour of the German Mother represented the fundamental ideologies of the role of the mother (the role of women under National Socialism) and ethnic-nationalism (the Völkisch movement) of that time period in Germany. Its inception followed the earlier "Roaring Twenties" or "golden 1920s" as it was later referred in Europe and a period during Germany's Weimar Republic, which saw young women breaking with traditional "mores" or likewise step aside from "traditional" lifestyle patterns.

=== Nomination ===
A recommendation presented collectively at the beginning of each month to the Präsidialkanzlei der Ordenskanzlei (Presidential Chancellery of the Chancellery of Honours) in Berlin for the Mother's Cross honour, could only be instigated by the local mayor's office, or on application from the Ortsgruppenleiter (local political party leader) of the National Socialist German Workers' Party (NSDAP), or the Kreiswart des Reichsbund der Kinderreichen (District Warden of the Reichs Union of Children-rich families).

=== Eligibility, criteria and bureaucratic process ===
The nomination involved a lengthy and exhaustive bureaucratic process. Not only were certain characteristics of the mother observed and eligibility studied thoroughly, but those too leading to the grandparents. The conferral of the Mother's Cross was so highly regarded by the government in Berlin, that additional bureaucratic resources assigned to lesser civil and military decorations were pulled for the exhaustive administrative procedures that this decoration alone required. Its precedence especially during Germany's wartime period saw all other civil honours and decorations but the Mother's Cross temporarily suspended since the original purpose for its establishment was now more significant. Local government agencies such as the Social Welfare Agency (Wohlfahrtsamt), Public Health Department (Gesundheitsamt), Youth Welfare Agency (Jugendamt), Police (Polizei) and other government agencies were all consulted in the eligibility investigation process. The decoration could and was only to be bestowed to the most honourable proven mothers. Accordingly, the following legislative prerequisites were to be strictly met:

- a) that both parents of the children were deutschblütig (of German blood-heredity) and genetically fit,
- b) that the mother of the decoration was indeed "worthy" of the decoration, and
- c) that the children were live births.

In some detail, these criteria required, for example:

- I). Evidence to be provided by the mother in the form of a signed declaration "that the mother—and her husband—is/are deutschblütig (of German blood-heredity), that their four grandparents are not of Jewish or other foreign ethnic origin, nor have ever belonged or subscribed to the Jewish religion, and in circumstances where the husband or marriage is deceased—confirms further that no contradictory facts are known in believing the Deutschblütigkeit (German bloodline) of the former husband". Unless doubts were cast to suggest otherwise in the validity of the declaration given, it was to be accepted as sufficient.
- II). The mother was indeed "worthy" of the decoration (I.e. proven an honourable mother of reputable moral standing, genetically healthy and genetically fit. With no evidence of prior confinement to a state penitentiary (Zuchthaus), marital infidelity, unlawful abortion, or any other personal burdens of taboo or social offences such as prostitution or promiscuous behaviour, intimate interracial relationships (miscegenation) or otherwise exogamy, amongst other criteria that were required to be investigated and evidenced by government authorities).
- III). Further conditions observed, involving the entire family, were that the children are clear of hereditary illnesses or genetic disorders, that a conscious responsibility exists without supervision in the parents being mindful of maintaining the family home to acceptable orderly standards and to nurturing their children towards being useful compatriots. The husband had not served a prison sentence, the family was not conceiving a great number of dependants (children) as a form of subsistence for the receipt of significant monetary disbursements of state child support (Kinderbeihilfe) and thereby feel entitled to avoid regular employment in exploiting such lifestyle, the family members were not chronic alcoholics, work-shy nor had conflicts with the law and police or presented other social delinquencies, and the family were not burdening private or public social welfare aid.

In the event the authorities were to find such discrepancies during their investigations leading to non-eligibility, the family risked being regarded or stigmatised as "asozial" (anti-social) or dysfunctional, which at that time was viewed as a risk and threat for the wellbeing of the German nation. It was declared inconceivable and abhorrent to consider or recommend any mother of such a family background for the Mother's Cross honour. In a further extract from the official application screening protocol, the local mayor's office was also encouraged, if his office was recommending a mother, to consider whether the mother in question, who has gifted her children life, has borne children likely to bear sacrifices in the interest of preserving the German nation, or whether the children posed a burden and peril to the future of the German nation, and the children perhaps should have better remained unborn.

=== Benefits and privileges ===
Various privileges were bound to honour, one example being preferential treatment, precedence and priority service within society and public services. As one recount recalls "...they were always given the best of everything: housing, food, clothing, and schooling for their children. Old people even had to give up their seats on the bus or streetcar. They were treated like royalty with the greatest respect. No standing in line for them. At the butcher's shop, the best cuts of meat would go into their baskets. A helper or nurse was assigned by the government to help them take care of the brood and arrived first thing in the morning". An annuity was also considered for a recipient mother of the decoration, but due to government budget constraints, this proved unworkable. Members of the Hitler Youth organization were also instructed; a wearer of the Mother's Cross was to be honourably greeted (saluted) when encountered. The Völkischer Beobachter (People's Observer) national newspaper (1938 Issue No. 25) stated: "...the holder of the Mother's Cross of Honour will in future enjoy all types of privileges that we by nature have accustomed to our nation's honoured comrades and our injured war veterans."

=== Annulment of recognition ===
The receipt of the decoration was no guarantee of permanent recognition; it could be annulled on a case-by-case basis under certain circumstances on the advice of the Reichsminister des Innern (Reichs-Minister of Interior).

== Recipients ==
=== Public presentation ceremonies ===
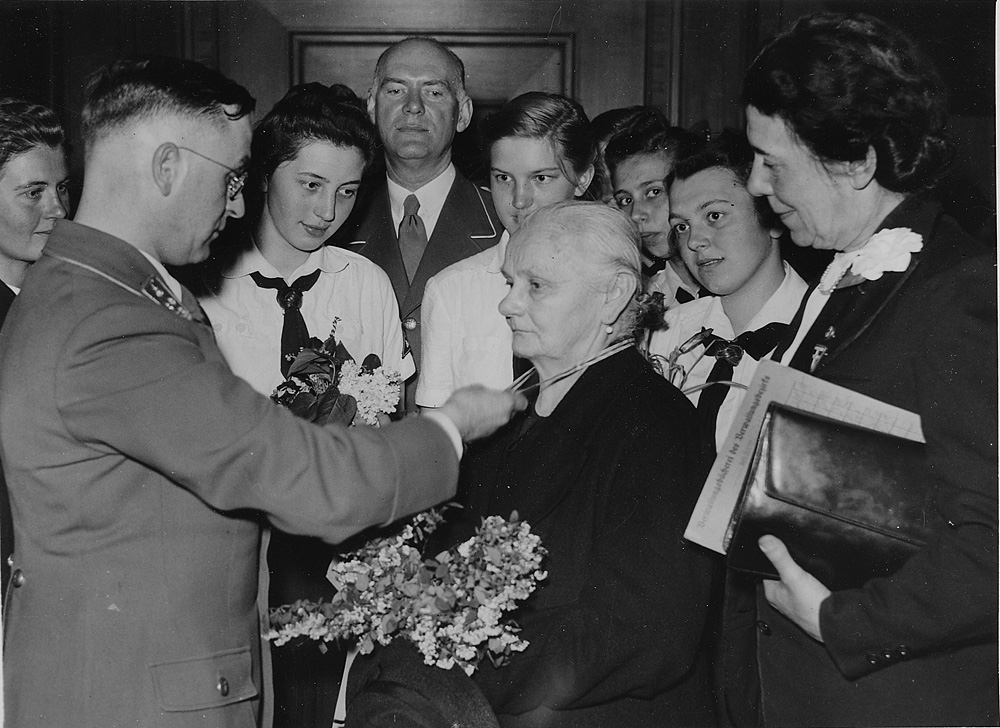
Woman receiving the Cross of Honour of the German Mother, Mother's Day 1943

The first public presentation ceremonies, following the inception of the Mother's Cross in December 1938, were held on Mother's Day 21 May 1939 across Germany. However, due to the unexpected high number of mothers eligible for the decoration across all classes on its inception, despite a stringent nomination criteria, resulted in the initial presentations being restricted to mothers of age 60 and above due to various administrative and logistics limitations. The first year presentations were also extended to include 1 October 1939 "harvest festival" day (Erntedankfest), equivalent to thanksgiving, and 24 December 1939 Christmas Eve. It was not until Mother's Day 1940 onwards that eligible mothers aged below 60 were finally presented with their Mother's Cross decoration and once again these presentations were deferred until a later date that same year. A recipient mother who could not attend her official invitation to a local public presentation ceremony received her decoration delivered through the postal service. Some presentation ceremonies were also recorded filmed events chronicled by the Die Deutsche Wochenschau (The German Weekly Newsreel).

=== Total decorations conferred ===
Exact total decorations bestowed throughout its existence are no longer traceable through the limited official records that survived the Second World War, the central application archives held at the Präsidialkanzlei (Presidential Chancellery) in Berlin were lost or otherwise destroyed by closing war events; however, it is estimated that up until September 1941 there were a total of 4.7 million recipient mothers honoured with the Mother's Cross decoration.

== Post-war ==
Since the defeat of Nazi Germany in 1945, the Mother's Cross has occasionally been referred to as the Mütterverdienstkreuz (Mother's Cross of Merit). The Mother's Cross belongs to the decorations and medals bestowed under Nazi rule, and its design incorporates a swastika. The public display of Nazi symbols is a crime in Germany and other countries. In 1957, the West German government passed the Law on Titles, Orders and Honours ("Ordensgesetz") which regulates all civil and military decorations; the Mother's Cross was not one of the Nazi-era decorations authorized to be redesigned for wear by recipients post-war.

== See also ==
- Médaille de l'enfance et des familles – the French equivalent
- Order of Maternal Glory and Mother Heroine – the Soviet Union-era equivalent
- List of awards honoring women
