= Vietnamese Heroic Mother =

Vietnamese Heroic Mother Bà mẹ Việt Nam anh hùng
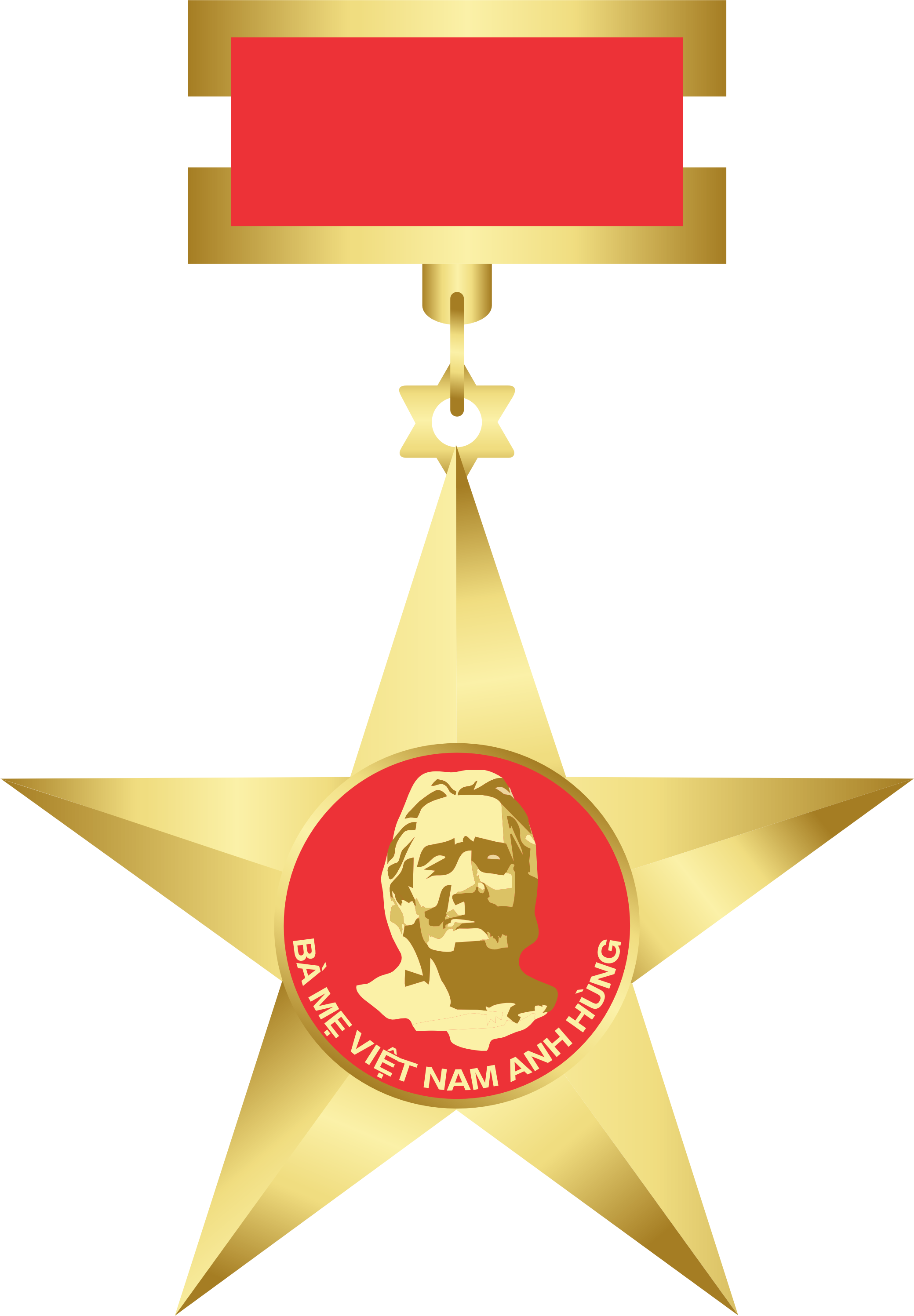
- Type: Single-grade order
- Country: Vietnam
- Presented by: the Government of Vietnam
- Eligibility: Vietnamese mothers
- Ribbon
- Status: Currently awarded
- First award: 1994

Highlights
- Total: 139,275 mothers (as of 2020)

The title Vietnamese Heroic Mother (Vietnamese: Bà mẹ Việt Nam anh hùng) is a Vietnamese title of honor awarded, or posthumously awarded, to mothers who have made numerous contributions and sacrifices for the cause of national liberation, independence, national construction and defence, and the performance of international obligations.

It is awarded in compliance with the regulations of the Standing Committee of the National Assembly of the Socialist Republic of Vietnam.

== History ==
In mid-May 1994, the Secretariat of the Central Committee of the Communist Party convened a meeting chaired by General Secretary Đỗ Mười to hear the General Political Department report on the state of policy work. Attending the meeting were leaders from the Ministry of Labor, War Invalids, and Social Affairs, the Ministry of Finance, and representatives from relevant agencies and sectors. After listening to the report, General Secretary Đỗ Mười requested everyone to focus on discussing and proposing solutions for pressing and important issues. In concluding the meeting, the General Secretary emphasised that for many years, the Party and State had implemented various policies in stabilising the country nationally with the help of the military along with different sectors, localities, and of course the people of Vietnam.

However, up to that point, there had been no adequate spiritual or material policy to honour a special group, Mothers. For they had sacrificed their outstanding children they bore to fight for the nation, especially during the First Indochina War, Vietnam War, Cambodian-Vietnamese War and the Sino-Vietnamese War ultimately resulting in millions of death and sorrow. These mothers made the ‘greatest contributions in the war for national liberation and defence’. The Secretariat instructed the General Political Department to collaborate with relevant ministries—particularly the Ministry of Labor, War Invalids, and Social Affairs—to research and develop a deserving policy for mothers who had made significant contributions. It can be affirmed that the idea of the “Heroic Vietnamese Mother” policy originated from this meeting of the Party Central Committee Secretariat.

Following the General Secretary’s conclusion, future General Secretary Mr. Lê Khả Phiêu, who at the time was Head of the General Political Department and Mr. Đặng Vũ Hiệp his Deputy Head, assigned the Policy Department to develop a proposal. Within a short period, the Policy Department dispatched officials to various localities to survey the number and living conditions of mothers who had lost multiple children in war, as well as to gather public opinions and aspirations. Based on this, the Policy Department drafted the proposal, coordinated research efforts, and sought input from relevant agencies both within and outside the military.

Subsequently, the Policy Department assisted the General Political Department, the Central Military Party Committee, and the Ministry of National Defence in drafting a submission to the Secretariat, The Government, and the National Assembly Standing Committee. This submission outlined key policy contents, including defining eligible subjects, criteria, forms of recognition, entitlements, and the process for awarding the title. Initially, during research and discussions, various names for this honorary title were proposed. Ultimately, “Heroic Vietnamese Mother” was chosen as the optimal name, receiving broad consensus among agencies.

On August 29, 1994, the National Assembly Standing Committee passed the Ordinance on the State Honorary Title "Heroic Vietnamese Mother".

On September 10, 1994, President Lê Đức Anh signed the order to promulgate the Ordinance on the State Honorary Title "Heroic Vietnamese Mother".

On October 20, 1994, the Government issued Decree 167-CP, implementing the Ordinance on the State Honorary Title "Heroic Vietnamese Mother".

On December 17, 1994, President Lê Đức Anh signed the first round of decisions to confer and posthumously confer the title "Heroic Vietnamese Mother" on 19,879 individuals nationwide.

On December 19, 1994, in celebration of the 50th anniversary of the founding of the Vietnam People’s Army and National Defence Day, the Communist Party of Vietnam and the Vietnamese government held a grand ceremony to honour 59 exemplary Heroic Vietnamese Mothers, representing nearly 20,000 mothers awarded the title.

In response to the call of the Central Committee of the Vietnam Fatherland Front, over the years, various localities, sectors, and organizations in Vietnam have launched the "Caring for Heroic Vietnamese Mothers" movement. In addition to the State’s official policies, support from military units, social organizations, and the public has helped improve both the material and spiritual lives of surviving mothers.

Under the direction of the General Political Department, the Policy Department was the lead agency responsible for researching, proposing, directing, and guiding the implementation of the "Heroic Vietnamese Mother" policy. Nguyễn Mạnh Đẩu, as the Director of the Policy Department, along with Phạm Lam, Đỗ Quang Bích (Deputy Directors), Nguyễn Văn Tinh, Lê Thế Hải (Commendation Department), and several other policy officers, played key roles in conducting investigations, surveys, drafting, and finalizing the official documents.

== Criteria ==
A mother who fits one or more of the following criteria are eligible to be awarded or posthumously awarded the title of Vietnamese Heroic Mother

1. Have two or more children who are revolutionary martyrs (soldiers who died fighting for the country)
2. Have two children of which one is a martyr while the other is a wounded veteran who lost 81% of their working ability
3. Have an only child who is a martyr
4. Have a child who is a martyr and a husband or the mother themselves are martyrs
5. Have a child who is a martyr and the mothers themselves are a wounded veteran who lost 81% of their working ability

A child recognised as a martyr includes both biological and legally adopted children, as long as they have been officially honoured with the "Tổ Quốc Ghi Công" (Certificate of National Merit) by the government.

If a mother who qualifies under any of these four conditions suffers from mental illness due to the grief of losing her child or husband, she is still eligible for the "Heroic Vietnamese Mother" title.

A husband recognized as a martyr is defined as someone who has been officially honored with the "Tổ Quốc Ghi Công" certificate, and whose wife (the mother) receives the benefits of a martyr’s pension.

This title is awarded or posthumously conferred by the President of Vietnam upon the recommendation of the Government.

Recipients (or their families in the case of posthumous awards) receive a certificate and a "Heroic Vietnamese Mother" medal.

== Benefits ==
Those awarded the titles are also awarded a Certificate, Medal and a government-paid award ceremony (applies as well if posthumously awarded) as well as government subsidies.

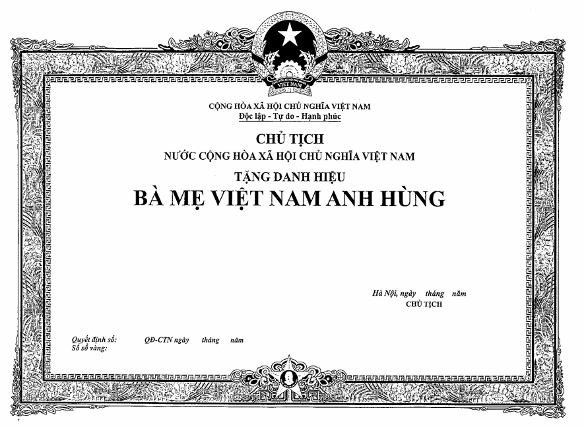
Template of a Vietnamese Heroice Mother Certificate

== See also ==
- Vietnam awards and decorations
- List of awards honoring women
