= Jugović brothers =

Serbian mythological characters

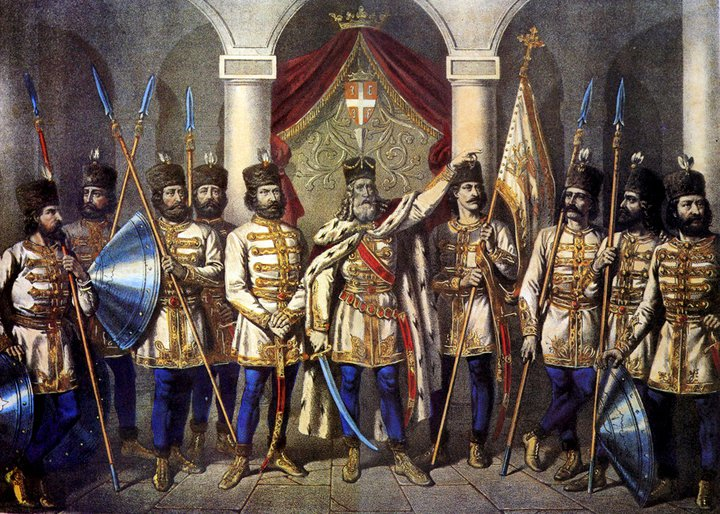
Jug Bogdan and the Nine Jugović, work by Adam Stefanović.

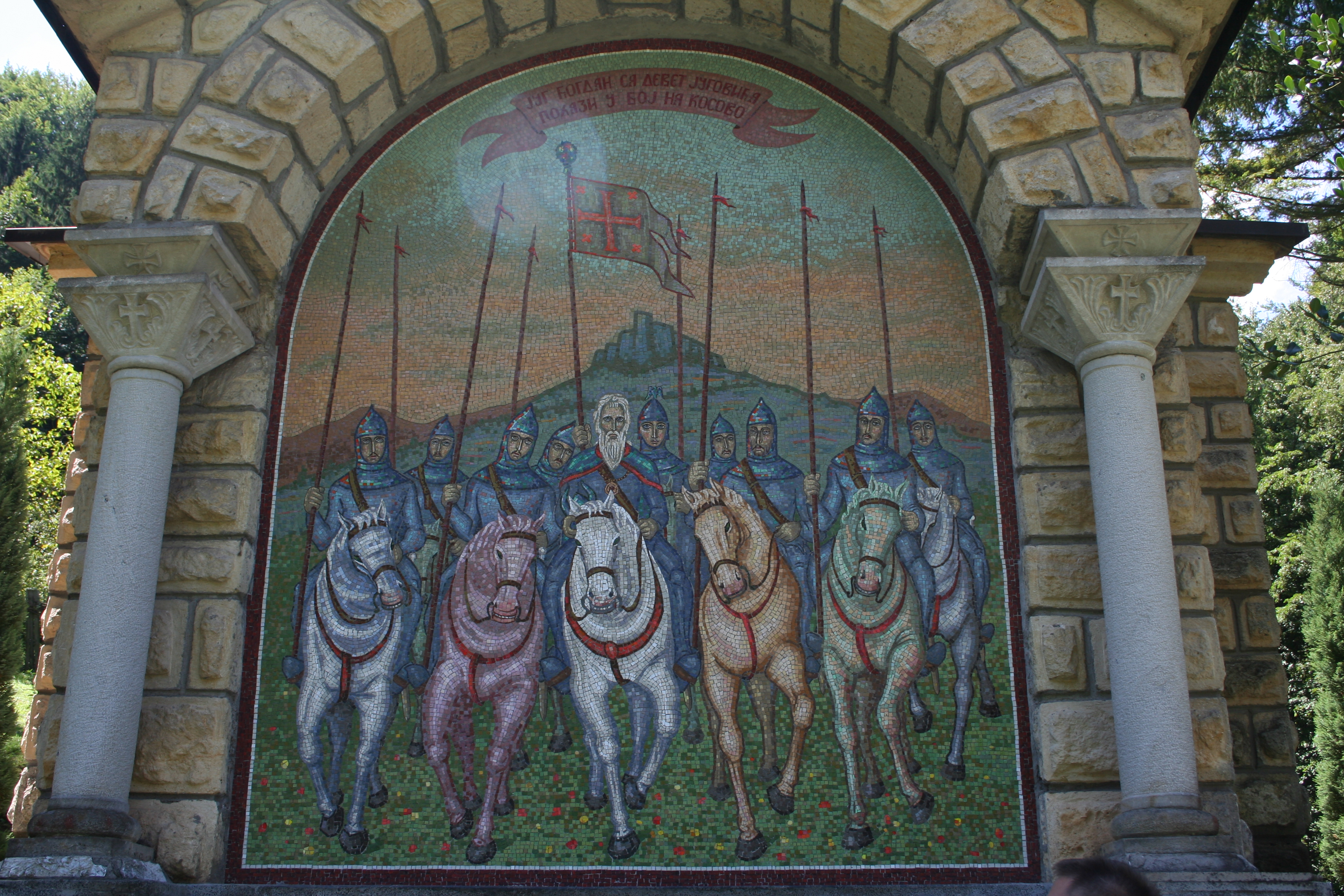
A mosaic of Jug Bogdan and the Nine Jugović, Chapel of Saint Panteleimon, Tronoša Monastery

The Jugovic brothers (Serbian: Браћа Југовићи / Braća Jugovići), or Nine Jugović (Serbian: Девет Југовића / Devet Jugovića), commonly known as the Jugovići (Serbian Cyrillic: Југовићи), the nine sons of Jug Bogdan (Vratko Nemanjić), are popular mythological characters of Serbian epic poetry. In poems, the Jugović brothers and their blood brother Miloš Obilić fight to their death in the Battle of Kosovo (1389), dying as heroes. This is based on mythology, in which Miloš Obilić and other knights lost their life "in glory as martyrs". One of the earliest accounts of the battle was the Florentine chancellor Coluccio Salutati (died 1406) who described twelve Christian noblemen who broke through the Ottomans, one of whom killed the Sultan (in later accounts, that knight was identified as Miloš Obilić).

The brothers have been depicted in the arts, such as by Croatian painter Mirko Rački, Serbian painter Adam Stefanović, and on a mosaic in the Tronoša Monastery.

The Serbian Church awards an order to mothers of more than four children, named after the mother of the Jugović brothers.

== See also ==
- Nine Brothers Kherkheulidze from Georgia, killed in the Battle of Marabda against Safavid Empire

== Sources ==
- Emmert, Thomas A. (1996), "Milos Obilic and the Hero Myth", Journal of the North American Society for Serbian Studies, 10, archived from the original on 2010-02-13
