= Order of Maternal Glory =

Soviet decoration honouring mothers of large families

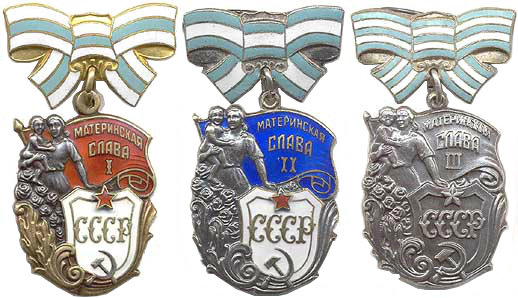
- Order of Maternal Glory, all three classes
- Type: Three-grade order
- Awarded for: bearing and raising 7 or more children
- Country: Soviet Union
- Presented by: Soviet Union
- Eligibility: Soviet citizens
- Status: No longer awarded
- Established: 8 July 1944
- First award: 6 December 1944

Highlights
- Total: First class – 881,070; Second class – 1,697,223; Third class – 3,083,328

Precedence
- Next (higher): Mother Heroine
- Next (lower): Maternity Medal

The Order of Maternal Glory (Russian: Орден «Материнская слава», romanized: Orden "Materinskaya slava") was a Soviet civilian award commemorating mothers with a substantial number of children, created on 8 July 1944 by Joseph Stalin and established with a decision of the Presidium of Supreme Soviet of the USSR. Its status was confirmed by the Soviet's decision of 18 August 1944 and later modified by 16 September 1947, 28 May 1973 and 28 May 1980 decisions. It was awarded on behalf of the Presidium of the Supreme Soviet of the USSR through decrees of local Soviet presidencies.

== Classes ==
The order was divided into three classes: first, second and third class.

It was conferred to:

- First class: mothers bearing and raising nine children.
- Second class: mothers bearing and raising eight children.
- Third class: mothers bearing and raising seven children.

The order was conferred upon the first birthday of the last child, provided that the other children necessary to reach the qualifying number (natural or adopted) remained alive. Children who had perished under heroic, military or other respectful circumstances, including occupational diseases, were also counted. The award was created simultaneously with the Mother Heroine (Russian: Мать-героиня) order and the Maternity Medal (Russian: Медаль материнства) and it was situated in between them. The author of the art project was Ivan Dubasov, then head artist of Goznak.

The first decree for bestowing the award was issued on 6 December 1944, when the first class order was conferred to 21 women, the second class to 26 and the third class to 27. In total the order was awarded in the first class to 753,000 women, 1,508,000 received the second class award and 2,786,000 received the third class award.

== Design ==
First class medals were totally silver made in a convex egg-shape. They were 36 mm (1.4 in) high and 29 mm (1.1 in) wide. In the upper part of the medal contained a red enamel flag with the phrase Материнская слава (Maternal Glory) and the Roman number showing the order's class. Below the flag, there was a white enamel shield with the CCCP (USSR) inscription. The upper part of the shield was decorated with a five-pointed star and the lower part with the hammer and sickle symbol. On the left side, there was a figure of a mother holding a son in her arms covered with roses on her lowest part. The lower part of the medal contains a flag and gilded lettering. In second class medals, the flag's enamel was dark-blue and there were not gilded parts while in the third class ones enamel disappeared from the flag, shield and star. The back of the medals was in white enamel. First class medals were suspended to a single light-blue fringe while second class had two light-blue fringes and third class three of them.

== See also ==
- List of awards honoring women
- Cross of Honor of the German Mother
- Médaille de l'enfance et des familles
- Altyn Alka
- Kumis Alka
- Mother Heroine
