= Kumis Alka =

Kazakh national award

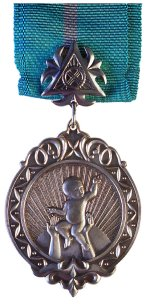
- Country: Kazakhstan
- Eligibility: Mothers with many children
- Established: 1995
- Ribbon of the medal

Precedence
- Next (higher): Altyn Alka

The Kumis Alka is a decoration awarded by the government of Kazakhstan. It is Kazakhstan's successor award to the Order of Maternal Glory. The medal is the second highest honor focused on motherhood after the Altyn Alka in the country. It rewards mothers who have raise at least six children.

== History ==
On 8 July 1944, the Supreme Soviet of the Soviet Union created the Order of Maternal Glory award. In 1991, the Dissolution of the Soviet Union occurred, leading to the end of the award. The award was reestablished by Kazakhstan as the Kumis Alka in 1993. The award was introduced to promote population growth. The medal originally rewarded mother of eight and nine children. In 2010, the president of Kazakhstan, Nursultan Nazarbayev, announced that the number of children required to receive the award would be reduced from eight to six.

== Appearance ==
The award has a yellow and blue ribbon with the same color scheme as Kazakhstan's flag. The medal's obverse is made of silver.

== Criteria ==
From 1993 until 2010, the decoration was awarded to mothers with many children who had given birth and raised eight or nine children when the last child reached the age of one year and if other children were alive.

Since 2010, the decoration is awarded to mothers with many children who have given birth and raised six children, when the sixth child reaches the age of one year and if the other children are alive.

== See also ==
- Altyn Alka
- Mother Heroine
- Order of Maternal Glory
- Médaille de l'enfance et des familles
- List of awards honoring women
