= Altyn Alka =

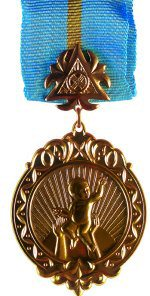
- Country: Kazakhstan
- Eligibility: Mothers with many children
- Established: 1995

Precedence
- Next (lower): Kumis Alka

The Altyn Alka is a decoration awarded by the government of Kazakhstan. It is Kazakhstan's successor award to the Soviet Mother Heroine. It is awarded to mothers who have raised at least seven children.

== History ==
On 8 July 1944, the Supreme Soviet of the Soviet Union created the Mother Heroine award. In 1991, the Dissolution of the Soviet Union occurred, which ended the awarding of the medal. In 1993, Kazakhstan decided to reinstate the award as the Altyn Alka. The award was created to promote fertility in the country.

== Appearance ==
The decoration has a blue and yellow ribbon similar to the colors of the flag of Kazakhstan. The obverse is made of gold.

== Criteria ==
As of 2025, the award is given to mothers with many children who have given birth and raised seven children, when the seventh child reaches the age of one year and if the other children are alive.

== See also ==
- Kumis Alka
- Mother Heroine
- Order of Maternal Glory
- Médaille de l'enfance et des familles
- List of awards honoring women
